= List of Allied ships lost to Italian surface vessels in the Mediterranean (1940–1943) =

The following is a list of Allied ships sunk, wrecked or captured at sea by surface vessels of the Regia Marina during the battle of the Mediterranean. The list includes vessels lost to the combined action of surface warships and airpower.

== List of ships ==
=== Cruisers ===
Name and date of loss	Italian unit(s) involved	Type of weapon	Notes
(United Kingdom) HMS York; Souda Bay, Crete; 26 March 1941	MTM motor boats Destroyers Francesco Crispi and Quintino Sella (motherships)	Explosive charges	Sunk in shallow waters Further damaged by Luftwaffe aircraft Salvage operations cancelled on 28 April 1941
(United Kingdom) HMS Manchester; Operation Pedestal; Cape Bon; 13 August 1942	Motor Torpedo Boats; MS 16 and MS 22	Torpedo	Scuttled by her own crew

=== Destroyers ===
Name and date of loss	Italian unit(s) involved	Type of weapon	Notes
(United Kingdom) HMS Mohawk; Tarigo Convoy; Kerkennah Islands; 16 April 1941	Destroyer Luca Tarigo	Torpedo	Sunk and capsized in low sea bed with only her forecastle sticking out of the water, which was hit by HMS Jervis for it to go completely under the water.
(United Kingdom) HMS Kingston; Second Battle of Sirte; Southeast of Malta; 22 March 1942	Battleship Littorio	Naval gunfire	Limped to Malta badly hit, laid up in drydock Further damaged by Luftwaffe aircraft Declared a total loss on 11 April 1942
(United Kingdom) HMS Bedouin; Operation Harpoon; South of Pantelleria; 15 June 1942	Cruisers; Montecuccoli and Eugenio di Savoia	Naval gunfire	Disabled in battle and taken in tow by destroyer HMS Partridge; Tow slipped when Italian cruisers reappeared Finished off by a S.M.79 torpedo bomber
(United Kingdom) HMS Eridge; El Daba, Egypt; 29 August 1942	Motor Torpedo Boat MTSM 228	Torpedo	Disabled, towed to Alexandria by destroyer HMS Aldenham; Declared a constructive total loss
(United Kingdom) HMS Pakenham; Cigno Convoy; Southwest of Sicily; 16 April 1943	Torpedo boats Cassiopea and Cigno	Naval gunfire	Disabled in battle and eventually scuttled by HMS Paladin

=== Motor Torpedo Boats ===
Name and date of loss	Italian unit(s) involved	Type of weapon	Notes
(United Kingdom) MTB 639; Kelibia, Tunisia; 28 April 1943	Torpedo boat Sagittario	Naval gunfire	Also strafed by Axis aircraft Scuttled by MTB 637
(United Kingdom) MTB 316; Operation Scylla; Strait of Messina; 17 July 1943	Cruiser Scipione Africano	Naval gunfire	Lost with all hands

=== Merchant ships ===
Name and date of loss	Italian unit(s) involved	Type of weapon	Notes
(Greece) Athinai, 2,897 ton Strait of Messina; 20 October 1940	Torpedo boat Simone Schiaffino	Seized at sea	Confiscated, renamed Palermo; Sunk by Allied aircraft while under German control in 1944
(United Kingdom) Desmoulea, 8,120 ton Between Avgo and Crete; Convoy AN 14; 31 January 1941	Torpedo boats Lupo and Libra	Torpedo	Disabled, beached at Souda Bay; Towed to Port Said; Further damaged by Luftwaffe aircraft Spent the rest of the war as a harbor ship in Bombay
(Norway) Pericles, 8,400 ton Souda Bay, Crete; 26 March 1941	MTM motor boats Destroyers Crispi and Sella (motherships)	Explosive charges	Sunk in shallow waters, disabled, eventually refloated Lost in a gale while towed to Alexandria on 14 April 1941
(United Kingdom) Kentucky, 9,308 ton Operation Harpoon; South of Pantelleria; 15 June 1942	Cruisers; Montecuccoli and Eugenio di Savoia; Destroyers; Ascari and Alfredo Oriani	Naval gunfire Torpedo	Previously crippled by Axis airstrikes Abandoned by her crew and escorts when the Italian squadron approached them
(United Kingdom) Burdwan, 6,069 ton Operation Harpoon; South of Panteleria; 15 June 1942	Cruisers; Montecuccoli and Eugenio di Savoia; Destroyers; Ascari and Oriani	Naval gunfire Torpedo	Previously crippled by Axis airstrikes Abandoned by her crew and escorts when the Italian squadron approached them
(United Kingdom) Glenorchy, 8,982 ton Operation Pedestal; Cape Bon; 13 August 1942	Motor Torpedo Boat MS 31	Torpedo	
(United Kingdom) Wairangi, 12,400 ton Operation Pedestal; Cape Bon; 13 August 1942	Motor Torpedo Boats; MAS 552 and MAS 554	Torpedo	
(United States) Almeria Lykes, 7,773 ton Operation Pedestal; Cape Bon; 13 August 1942	Motor Torpedo Boat MAS 554	Torpedo	
(United States) Santa Elisa, 8,379 ton Operation Pedestal; Cape Bon; 13 August 1942	Motor Torpedo Boats; MAS 557 and MAS 564	Torpedo; Machine gun fire	

=== Submarines ===
Name and date of loss	Italian unit(s) involved	Type of weapon	Notes
(United Kingdom) HMS Odin; 14 June 1940	Destroyer Strale	Depth charges Ramming	
(United Kingdom) HMS Grampus; 16 June 1940	Torpedo boat Polluce	Depth charges Naval gunfire	
(United Kingdom) HMS Phoenix; 16 July 1940	Torpedo boat Albatros	Depth charges	
(United Kingdom) HMS Oswald; 1 August 1940	Destroyer Ugolino Vivaldi	Ramming	
(United Kingdom) HMS Rainbow; 4 October 1940	Cargo ship Antonietta Costa	Ramming	
(Greece) Proteus; 29 December 1940	Torpedo boat Antares	Ramming	
(United Kingdom) HMS Union; 20 July 1941	Torpedo boat Circe	Depth charges	
(United Kingdom) HMS Cachalot; 30 July 1941	Torpedo boat Generale Achille Papa	Ramming	
(United Kingdom) HMS Tempest; 12 February 1942	Torpedo boat Circe	Depth charges Naval gunfire	Captured, sank while in tow
(United Kingdom) HMS P38; 23 February 1942	Torpedo boat Circe	Depth charges Naval gunfire	Also strafed by Italian aircraft
(United Kingdom) HMS Upholder; 14 April 1942	Torpedo boat Pegaso	Depth charges	
(United Kingdom) HMS Thorn; 7 August 1942	Torpedo boat Pegaso	Depth charges	
(United Kingdom) HMS P222; 12 December 1942	Torpedo boat Fortunale	Depth charges	
(United Kingdom) HMS P48; 25 December 1942	Torpedo boats Ardente and Ardito	Depth charges	
(United Kingdom) HMS Turbulent; 6 March 1943	Torpedo boat Ardito	Depth charges	
(United Kingdom) HMS Thunderbolt; 14 March 1943	Corvette Cicogna	Depth charges	
(United Kingdom) HMS Sahib; 24 April 1943	Torpedo boat Climene; Corvette Gabbiano	Depth charges	Also bombed by Luftwaffe aircraft
(United Kingdom) HMS Saracen; 14 August 1943	Corvettes Euterpe and Minerva	Depth charges	Also strafed by Italian aircraft

=== Minor auxiliary units ===
Type and date of loss	Italian unit(s) involved	Type of weapon	Notes
(United Kingdom) Sailing yacht Aegean Sea; 31 July 1941	Minelayer Azio	Seized at sea	During a mission to support Greek resistance in the Peloponnese
(Greece) Sailing yacht Urania off Corfu; 15 May 1942	Destroyer Saetta	Seized at sea	Captured when heading for Malta
(United Kingdom) Several minor landing craft Operation Agreement; Tobruk; 14 September 1942	Torpedo boats Castore and Generale Carlo Montanari armed tug Vega; 4 motorbarges	Seized at sea	At least two powerboats manned by Royal Marines were rounded up at sea by the Italian squadron while attempting to sail back to Alexandria
(Greece) (United Kingdom) Motorsailer; Aghios Dimitros off Simi; 15 March 1943	Motor Torpedo Boats; MAS 545 and MAS 549	Seized at sea	Previously commandeered by a British boarding party and a Greek naval officer from the Greek submarine Papanicolis while en route from Pireus to Rhodes and diverted to Turkish waters. The Allied personnel were taken prisoner.
(Greece) (United Kingdom) Two motorsailers Straits of Artemisium; 22 April 1943	Turbine	Seized at sea	Two British liaison officers captured
(Greece) (United Kingdom) Motorsailer; Straits of Artemisium; 25 April 1943	Turbine	Naval gunfire	Sunk with military equipment for Greek partisans

=== Ships sunk by manned torpedoes from Olterra (Note: Olterra was an Italian auxiliary vessel used as a stationary mothership for manned torpedoes at Algeciras Bay.) ===
Name and date of loss	Type of ship	Aftermath
(United Kingdom) Camerata; 4,875 ton Gibraltar; 8 May 1943	Steamer	Hull refloated in 1947; Sold to a Spanish company, rebuilt as Campo Grande
(United States) Pat Harrison; 7,000 ton Gibraltar; 8 May 1943	Liberty ship	Constructive total loss
(Norway) Thorshøvdi; 9,900 ton Gibraltar; 4 August 1943	Tanker	Broken in two. Aft and fore sections towed to Britain, rebuilt in 1947 as Giert Torgersen
(United States) Harrison Grey Otis 7,700 ton Gibraltar; 4 August 1943	Liberty ship	Constructive total loss

== See also ==
- List of ships sunk by the Imperial Japanese Navy
- List of wrecked or lost ships of the Ottoman steam navy
