= Italian torpedo boat Pegaso =

Pegaso was the name of at least two ships of the Italian Navy and may refer to:

- Italian torpedo boat Pegaso (1905), a Pegaso-class torpedo boat launched in 1905 and discarded in 1923.
- Italian torpedo boat Pegaso (1936), an Orsa-class torpedo boat launched in 1936 and scuttled in 1943.
