= Italian ship Ciclone =

Ciclone has been borne by at least two ships of the Italian Navy and may refer to:

- Italian patrol boat Ciclone, previously the Norwegian whaler Alpha purchased by Italy in 1917 and renamed. She was discarded in 1920.
- Italian torpedo boat Ciclone, a Ciclone-class torpedo boat launched in 1942 and sunk in 1943.
