= Italian torpedo boat Procione =

Procione was the name of at least two ships of the Italian Navy and may refer to:

- Italian torpedo boat Procione (1905), a Pegaso-class torpedo boat launched in 1905 and discarded in 1924.
- Italian torpedo boat Procione (1937), an Orsa-class torpedo boat launched in 1937 and scuttled in 1943.
