= Italian ship Fortunale =

Fortunale has been borne by at least two ships of the Italian Navy and may refer to:

- Italian patrol boat Fortunale, previously the Norwegian fishing boat Lionell Jacobsen purchased by Italy in 1916 and renamed. She was discarded in 1919.
- Italian torpedo boat Fortunale, a Ciclone-class torpedo boat launched in 1942 and transferred to Russia under the designation Z 17 in 1949.
