= Italian ship Monsone =

Monsone has been borne by at least three ships of the Italian Navy and may refer to:

- Italian patrol boat Monsone (1915), previously the French mercantile Maumusson purchased by Italy in 1915 and renamed. She was sunk in 1916.
- Italian patrol boat Monsone (1916), previously the Brazilian mercantile Maranbac purchased by Italy in 1916 and renamed. She was discarded in 1920.
- Italian torpedo boat Monsone, a Ciclone-class torpedo boat launched in 1942 and sunk in 1943.
