= Italian ship Folaga =

Folaga was the name of at least two ships of the Italian Navy and may refer to:

- Italian patrol boat Folaga, Previously mercantile SS Puma purchased in 1916 for use as a patrol boat and discarded in 1920.
- Italian corvette Folaga, a Gabbiano-class corvette launched in 1942 and stricken in 1965.
