= Giuseppe Cigala Fulgosi =

Italian naval officer

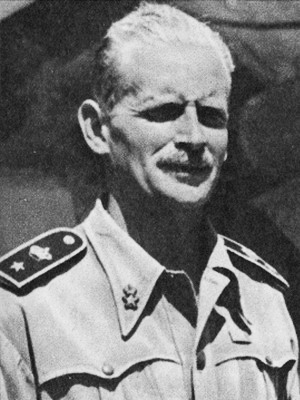
- Born: 25 July 1910; Piacenza, Kingdom of Italy
- Died: 1 November 1977 (aged 67); Rome, Italy
- Military career
- Allegiance: Kingdom of Italy
- Branch: Regia Marina
- Service years: 1925–1947
- Rank: Capitano di Vascello (Captain)
- Commands: Sagittario (torpedo boat); Euro (destroyer); 6th Torpedo Boat Squadron
- Conflicts: World War II; Battle of Punta Stilo; Battle of Cape Spartivento; Battle of Crete; Battle of the Duisburg Convoy
- Awards: Gold Medal of Military Valor; Bronze Medal of Military Valor (three times); War Cross for Military Valor (twice); Iron Cross Second Class

Giuseppe Cigala Fulgosi (Piacenza, 25 July 1910 – Rome, 1 November 1977) was an Italian naval officer during World War II.

== Biography ==
He was born in Piacenza on 25 July 1910, the son of Alfonso Cigala Fulgosi, a career officer of the Royal Italian Army, and of Anna Teresa Osio. After enlisting in the Royal Italian Navy, in 1925 he enrolled at the Royal Naval Academy of Livorno, graduating in 1930 with the rank of ensign. He was initially assigned on the heavy cruiser Trieste and later on the training ship Cristoforo Colombo, where he was promoted to sub-lieutenant. He then served on the destroyer Aquilone, on the torpedo boat Indomito as executive officer, and in 1933 he was assigned to the scout cruiser Quarto, then stationed in China.

In 1934 he was transferred to the Marine Detachment of Tianjin, then returning to Italy towards the end of that year. He served on the destroyers Lanzerotto Malocello, Leone Pancaldo (where he was promoted to lieutenant), and Scirocco and was then appointed adjutant to the commander-in-chief of the Naval Department of La Spezia. In 1936 he was assigned on the battleship Conte di Cavour as the third fire control officer, after which he held the post of aide of Admiral Ferdinando of Savoy-Genoa from late 1936 to June 1940. In 1939 he obtained a degree in economics from the Ca' Foscari University of Venice.

When the Kingdom of Italy entered the Second World War, on 10 June 1940, he was executive officer on the destroyer Ascari, on which he participated in the battles of Punta Stilo and Cape Spartivento, earning a War Cross for Military Valor. In December 1940 he assumed the command of the torpedo boat Sagittario, with which he distinguished himself during the battle of Crete, on 22 May 1941, when he fought off Force C (three cruisers and four destroyers, under Rear Admiral Edward Leigh Stuart King) and thus saved a convoy of caiques loaded with German troops he had been tasked with escorting to Crete. For this action he was awarded the Gold Medal of Military Valor by Italy and the Iron Cross Second Class by Germany.

In July 1941 he was promoted to lieutenant commander and given command of the destroyer Euro, with which he fought in the battle of the Duisburg Convoy in November, where his ship was the only escorting destroyer that tried to counterattack Force K, albeit to no avail (Cigala Fulgosi narrowly escaped death when shell splinters that hit him in the chest were stopped by his pair of binoculars). In command of Euro, he earned three bronze medals of military valor while escorting convoys to North Africa. In July 1942 he became Chief of Staff of the MZ barge flotilla involved in resupply missions along the coast of North Africa, being wounded in Marsa Matruh. In November 1942 he assumed command of the 6th Torpedo Squadron with the new Ciclone-class torpedo boat Impetuoso as flagship. On 10 June 1943 he received in Rome, on the occasion of the Day of the Navy, the gold medal for military valor (awarded to him for the May 1941 action off Crete) which was pinned on his chest directly by King Victor Emmanuel III, but on the following day he received the news that his younger brother Agostino, a fighter pilot in the Regia Aeronautica, had been shot down over Sardinia.

On the night of 9 September 1943, the day following after the proclamation of the Armistice of Cassibile, he sailed from La Spezia with his ship as part of the battlefleet under the command of Admiral Carlo Bergamini. The fleet initially headed for La Maddalena in Sardinia, but was informed that that base had been seized by German forces and was shortly thereafter attacked by the Luftwaffe which sank the flagship Roma, killing Bergamini. Impetuoso was among the ship that participated in the rescue of Roma's survivors, after which she headed for Port Mahon, in the Balearic Islands, where she landed the survivors. Faced with internment by the Spanish authorities, Cigala Fulgosi and the commander of the torpedo boat Pegaso, Cdr. Riccardo Imperiali, decided to scuttle their ships in deep waters off Mahon. The crews were then interned in Spain until July 1944, when they were repatriated following an agreement between Italy, Spain and the Allies; during internment Cigala Fulgosi received the news of the death of his father, executed by the Germans after the Armistice.

After returning to Italy, he was assigned to the staff of the Italian Co-belligerent Navy. In November 1944 he was promoted to commander, and later in the war he was among the proponents of a landing of the San Marco Regiment near Trieste, in order from preventing the Yugoslav People's Liberation Army from seizing the city, but the plan was not authorized by the Allies. Belonging to an aristocratic family with long monarchist traditions, in July 1946 he retired from active service following the establishment of the Italian Republic. He was later promoted to captain in the naval reserve.

He then dedicated himself to the activities of the FISE, the Italian Federation of Equestrian Sports, of which he became president (like his father had before him) and with which he won a number of international equestrian competitions. He died in Rome on November 1, 1977. The Marina Militare has named a Comandanti-class patrol vessel after him.
