= Italian ship Gabbiano =

Gabbiano was the name of at least two ships of the Italian Navy and may refer to:

- Italian torpedo boat Gabbiano, a torpedo boat launched in 1907 and discarded in 1921.
- Italian corvette Gabbiano, a Gabbiano-class corvette launched in 1942 and decommissioned in 1971.
