= Italian submarine chaser Albatros =

Submarine chaser of the Regia Marina

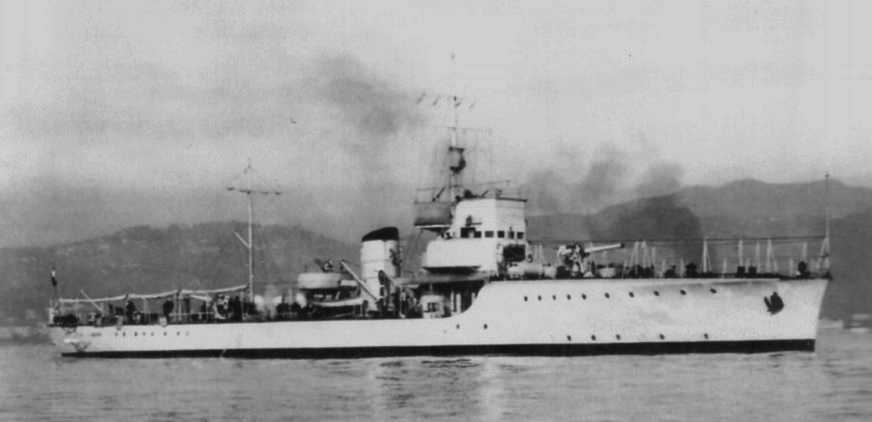
- subchaser Albatros

History

Kingdom of Italy
- Name: Albatros
- Namesake: Albatross
- Owner: Regia Marina
- Builder: CNR, Palermo
- Laid down: November 1931
- Launched: 27 May 1934
- Commissioned: 10 November 1934
- Fate: Sunk 27 September 1941

General characteristics
- Displacement: 334 tonnes (329 long tons) standard; 490 tonnes (482 long tons) full load
- Length: 231.50 ft (70.56 m)
- Beam: 22.5 ft (6.9 m)
- Draught: 1.71 m (5 ft 7 in) standard; 2.25 m (7 ft 5 in) full load
- Installed power: 4,300 hp (3,200 kW)
- Propulsion: 2-shaft Beluzzo geared turbines; 2 boilers of 3-drum type; 2 shafts
- Speed: 24.5 knots (45.4 km/h; 28.2 mph)
- Endurance: 1,420 nmi (2,630 km; 1,630 mi) at 14 knots (26 km/h; 16 mph)
- Complement: 52 (3 officers + 49 non-officers and sailors)
- Sensors & processing systems: SAFAR 600 sonar (June 1939)
- Armament: 2 × single 100 mm (4 in)/47 caliber guns (1934); 2 × twin 13.2 mm Breda anti-aircraft guns (1934); 2 × single 100 mm (4 in)/35 caliber guns (1935); 2 × single 13.2 mm Breda anti-aircraft guns (1937); 2 × single 8 mm machine guns (1939); 4 DC Throwers; 2 DC rails; 2 tow torpedoes

Albatros was a submarine chaser of the Regia Marina built in the 1930s which served during World War II. Later she was reclassified as a torpedo boat, most likely purely for administrative purposes.

== Design and description ==
In the late 1920s – early 1930s, Regia Marina was interested in developing a designated anti-submarine vessel. Albatros was the first experimental project offered and accepted for production with the original plan calling for the construction of 25 ships. The preliminary study for the project was conducted in 1929 and was influenced by the hull shapes of contemporary coastal torpedo boats and envisaged a pair of 450 mm torpedo tubes installed in the bow of the ship. As Italy was bound by the terms of London Naval Treaty, which only limited the number of ships above 600 t, these ships were designed with this limit in mind. The prototype turned out to be rather unsuccessful, due to poor seaworthiness outside of coastal areas, difficulty in operating and maintenance of her steam propulsion turbines, poor and outdated armament, and the project was canceled, with development shifting onto a bigger boat (future Pegaso-class escorts) with better armament, and easier to use engines. The torpedo tubes were never installed.

One has to wonder, if politics played a significant role in this decision. The majority in the government (but minority of the Regia Marina) favored development of capital ships, so allocated resources went mainly into this area, including unnecessary rebuilding of old-era heavy cruisers, or extending their service, but reducing financing to scientific and technical developments, and production of ammunition. In 1935 Albatros was reclassified as a second-line ship, and was assigned to Regia Marina's naval experimental unit at La Spezia.

== Construction and career ==
Albatros was launched on 27 May 1934, after 3 years of construction, commissioned on 10 November 1934, entered the service with Regia Marina by the end of 1934. Being almost immediately reclassified as a second-line ship, her more modern 100 mm (4 in)/47 caliber cannons were replaced with World War I era 100 mm (4 in)/35 caliber ones. In 1937 her 13.2 mm Breda twin anti-aircraft guns were first replaced with two single 13.2 mm Breda anti-aircraft guns, and later by two single 8 mm machine guns.

In June 1939 SAFAR 600 (the first Italian sonar or echo-goniometer) was installed and successfully tested on Albatros. However, production was halted due to a need to produce sonars for submarines. The results of sonar tests were actually pretty good, Albatros was able to identify targets at 3,000–3,500 meters (9,800–11,500 ft), and sometimes even at 7,000 m (23,000 ft) in early 1940. The maximum speed of the ship in these experiments was restricted to 12 knots (22 km/h; 14 mph). With the outbreak of hostilities, Albatros was assigned to patrol duty in the Strait of Messina, and these experiments were halted. Strong currents present in the Strait of Messina significantly interfered with the sonar equipment, and its use was severely limited during her active duty.

During her short career she was used for patrol and anti-submarine hunting missions, mainly in the Strait of Messina, and along the eastern coast of Sicily and overall performed 57 various missions. Albatros also escorted the transatlantic liner SS Rex on her last voyage on 6 June 1940 from Genoa to Trieste and from there on 15 August, to Pula. On 22 June 1940 she was fired upon by an enemy submarine, but was not hit.

On 16 July 1940 Albatros while patrolling off Augusta was spotted and attacked with two torpedoes by the British submarine HMS Phoenix. After being able to successfully maneuver and avoid torpedoes, Albatros went on a depth charge attack sinking Phoenix with all hands in the position 37°15′N 15°15′E.

At 6:40 on 27 September 1941 Albatross under command of captain Alessandro Mazzetti left Messina to meet up with the German submarine U-371 and to escort her through the Strait of Messina. At 8:20 the British submarine HMS Upright spotted Albatros off Milazzo and decided to attack. Albatros detected the submarine and started closing in trying to ping the submarine's position. At 8:55, when the Italian ship came in for the second pass, Upright launched two torpedoes from approximately 2,750 m (9,020 ft) away. One torpedo hit Albatros while the British submarine rapidly dove down. Albatros sank in the position 38°24′N 15°22′E eight miles (13 km) northwest of Milazzo. 36 men died, and there were 47 survivors.
