= Carlo Fecia di Cossato =

Italian military commander (1908–1944)

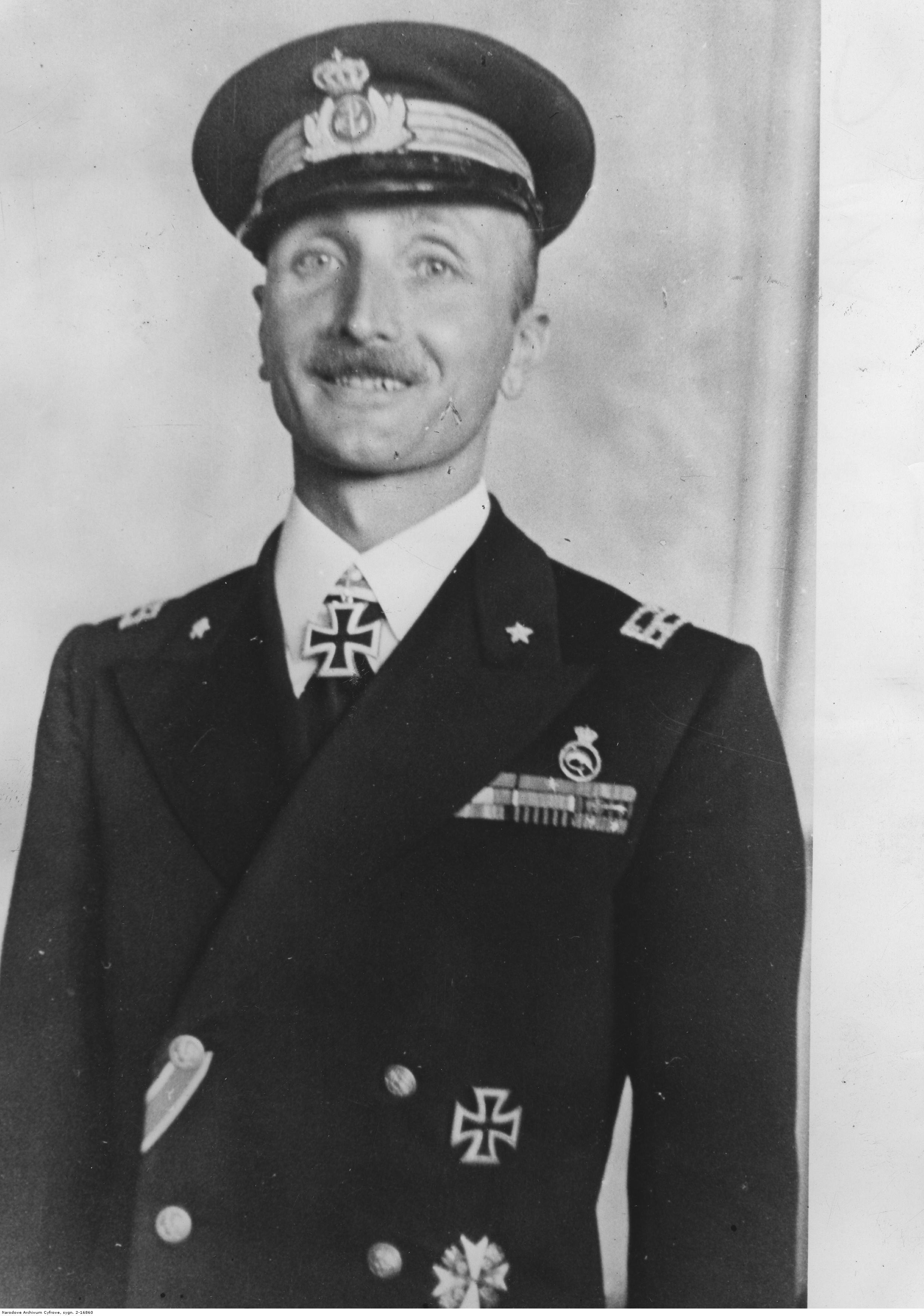
- Born: 25 September 1908; Rome, Italy
- Died: 27 August 1944 (aged 35); Naples, Italy
- Military career
- Allegiance: Kingdom of Italy
- Branch: Regia Marina
- Service years: 1928–1944
- Commands: Ciro Menotti (submarine); Enrico Tazzoli (submarine); Aliseo (torpedo boat); 3rd Torpedo Boat Squadron
- Conflicts: Second Italo-Ethiopian War; Spanish Civil War; World War II; Battle of the Mediterranean; Battle of the Atlantic; Action off Bastia
- Awards: Gold Medal of Military Valour; Silver Medal of Military Valor (twice); Bronze Medal of Military Valor (twice); War Cross for Military Valor; Knight's Cross of the Iron Cross; Iron Cross First Class; Iron Cross Second Class

Carlo Fecia di Cossato (25 September 1908 – 27 August 1944) was an officer in the Regia Marina (Italian Royal Navy), in command of submarines and torpedo boats during World War II. He was credited with the confirmed sinking of 23 enemy ships (16 Allied ships before the Armistice of Cassibile, with the submarine Enrico Tazzoli, and 7 German vessels after the armistice, with the torpedo boat Aliseo). He was also a recipient of the Knight's Cross of the Iron Cross and of the Gold Medal of Military Valor, the highest decoration of the Italian Armed Forces.

Fecia di Cossato was born in Rome, Italy, on 25 September 1908. He graduated from the Naval Academy in Livorno in 1928 and assumed his duties as an officer at the Italian Naval Detachment in China. In the early 1930s, he was an officer on two submarines and his service included participation in the Spanish Civil War.

At the beginning of World War II, Fecia di Cossato was the commander of the submarine Ciro Menotti based in Messina; after some months he was transferred to Bordeaux and given command of the submarine Tazzoli. This submarine operated in the Atlantic Ocean, sinking 18 ships with a total tonnage of 96,553 tons; 16 of these ships, for a total tonnage of 86,545 GRT, were sunk under Fecia di Cossato's command. In February 1943, at the end of the mission near Brazil he was transferred to Italy, where he was given command of a squadron of torpedo boats.

After the Allies' Armistice with Italy, he fought with bravery against German shipping near Bastia, sinking seven enemy vessels. Fecia di Cossato was displeased with the events of late 1943 and early 1944, and committed suicide in Naples on 27 August 1944.

== Early life and career ==
Fecia di Cossato was born in Rome in 1908 to a family of the Piedmontese nobility. In his youth, he attended the Royal Military College of Moncalieri and then the Italian Naval Academy in Livorno, where he graduated in 1928 as an ensign. Immediately after graduation, he was assigned on the submarine Bausan.

In 1929, after promotion to sub-lieutenant, Fecia di Cossato was assigned to the Italian Naval Detachment in Beijing and sent to China on the scout cruiser Libia. He returned to Italy in 1933, was promoted to lieutenant and was assigned on the light cruiser Bari, stationed in Massawa during the Second Italo-Ethiopian War. He then participated in two special missions on submarines during the Spanish Civil War. In 1939 Fecia di Cossato attended the Italian Navy Submarine School in Pola, after which he was promoted to lieutenant commander and given command of a submarine.

== At the outbreak of World War II ==
When Italy entered World War II, Fecia di Cossato was the commanding officer of the submarine Ciro Menotti, based in Messina as part of the 33rd Submarine Squadron. In this role, he participated in several missions in the Mediterranean Sea. In the autumn of 1940 he was transferred to the BETASOM submarine base, in occupied France, where he started his participation in the Battle of the Atlantic as executive officer of the submarine Enrico Tazzoli, whose commanding officer was Lieutenant Commander Vittore Raccanelli.

== In command of Enrico Tazzoli ==
On 5 April 1941 Fecia di Cossato was given command of Tazzoli, with Lieutenant Gianfranco Gazzana-Priaroggia as executive officer. Fecia di Cossato and Gazzana Priaroggia (who was later given command of the submarines Archimede and Leonardo da Vinci) were to become Italy's most successful submariners in World War II.

=== Early sinkings ===
On April 7, 1941 Tazzoli left Bordeaux for its first mission under Fecia di Cossato. After reaching a patrol area off the coast of West Africa, on April 12 the submarine attacked two British cruisers with torpedoes, but no hits were obtained. On April 15, Tazzoli sank the British steamer Aurillac (4,733 GRT) with torpedoes and gunfire. On May 7, Tazzoli sank the Norwegian steamer Fernlane (4,310 GRT) and two days later the Norwegian tanker Alfred Olsen (8,817 GRT). The latter required two days of pursuit, all remaining torpedoes and a hundred artillery rounds, forcing Tazzoli to return to base after sinking it. On the way back, Tazzoli was attacked by an enemy plane, but the reaction of its machine guns damaged the plane and forced it to fly away.

On May 25, Tazzoli reached Bordeaux, where Fecia di Cossato was awarded a Silver Medal of Military Valor. On July 15, 1941, Fecia di Cossato sailed for a new mission during which, on August 12, he destroyed the grounded wreck of the British steamer Sangara (5,449 GRT, already damaged by a previous attack by the German submarine U-69) and on August 19 he sank the Norwegian tanker Sildra (7,313 GRT) about fifty miles off Freetown. He returned to base on September 11 and was awarded a Bronze Medal of Military Valor and an Iron Cross Second Class.

=== Rescue of the Atlantis and Python survivors ===
In December 1941 Tazzoli left Bordeaux to take part in the rescue of 400 survivors from the German commerce raider Atlantis and the German supply ship Python, that had been sunk off the Cape Verde islands. German U-boats had rescued the survivors from the sea, but did not have enough space to adequately house them, therefore the German command requested the intervention of the larger Italian submarines. Tazzoli and three other Betasom submarines (Torelli, Calvi and Finzi) thus sailed from Bordeaux after disembarking nonessential personnel and loading substantial supplies of food and water. At the rendezvous with the German U-boats, Tazzoli took onboard about 70 survivors, including Atlantis' executive officer Ulrich Mohr.

On Christmas Eve Tazzoli, sailing on the surface, was attacked by an enemy plane and forced to crash dive. On the following day, the submarine reached Saint-Nazaire, where the survivors were landed. For his part in the rescue of the survivors from the two German ships, Grand Admiral Karl Dönitz awarded Fecia di Cossato the Iron Cross First Class.

=== In American waters ===
On 11 February 1942, after the United States' entry into the war, Tazzoli under Fecia di Cossato left for a new mission, off the coasts of America. On 6 March the submarine sank the Dutch steamer Astrea (1,406 GRT), and on the following day the Norwegian motor ship Torsbergfjord (3,156 GRT). On 9 March Tazzoli sank the Uruguayan steamer Montevideo (5,785 GRT), on 11 March the Panama-flagged steamer Cygnet (3,628 GRT), on 13 March the British steamer Daytonian (6,434 GRT) and two days later the British tanker Athelqueen (8,780 GRT). In the fight against the latter, Tazzoli suffered some damage, following which Fecia di Cossato decided to return to base, where he arrived on 31 March. Following this mission Fecia di Cossato was awarded another Silver Medal of Military Valor by the Italian authorities and an Iron Cross Second Class with Sword by the German authorities.

On 18 June 1942, Fecia di Cossato sailed with Tazzoli for a new mission in the Caribbean. On 2 August he attacked and sank the Greek merchant Castor (1,830 GRT), and four days later he sank the Norwegian tanker Havsten (6,161 GRT), allowing her crew to abandon ship and be rescued by a nearby Argentinian ship, before sinking her. On 5 September, Tazzoli returned to base; for this mission Fecia di Cossato received a Bronze Medal of Military Valor.

On 14 November 1942, Fecia Di Cossato sailed for his last mission on Tazzoli. On 12 December the submarine sank the British steamer Empire Hawk (5,032 GRT) and the Dutch merchant Ombilin (5,658 GRT); on 21 December the British steamer Queen City (4,814 GRT) became Tazzoli's next victim, followed on Christmas by the American motor ship Dona Aurora (5,011 GRT). During the return voyage, the submarine was attacked by a British four-engined plane, that was shot down by Tazzoli's machine gunners. On 2 February 1943, Tazzoli ended her patrol in Bordeaux. On 19 March 1943, Fecia di Cossato was awarded a Knight's Cross of the Iron Cross by the German authorities, for his successes in the Atlantic.

=== Ships sunk ===
Ships sunk by Enrico Tazzoli under Carlo Fecia di Cossato
Patrol	Date	Ship	Flag	Tonnage (GRT)	Notes
5th	15 April 1941	Aurillac	United Kingdom	4,248	Freighter, 1 killed
5th	7 May 1941	Fernlane	Norway	4,310	Freighter with ammunition cargo, no casualties
5th	10 May 1941	Alfred Olsen	Norway	8,817	Tanker, no casualties
6th	19 August 1941	Sildra	Norway	7,313	Tanker, no casualties
8th	6 March 1942	Astrea	Netherlands	1,406	Freighter
8th	6 March 1942	Tonsbergfjord	Norway	3,156	Freighter; 1 killed
8th	8 March 1942	Montevideo	Uruguay	5,785	Freighter; 14 killed
8th	10 March 1942	Cygnet	Greece	3,628	Freighter; no casualties
8th	13 March 1942	Daytonian	United Kingdom	6,434	Freighter; 1 killed
8th	15 March 1942	Athelqueen	United Kingdom	8,780	Tanker; 3 killed
9th	2 August 1942	Kastor	Greece	5,497	Freighter; 4 killed
9th	6 August 1942	Havsten	Norway	6,161	Tanker; 2 killed
10th	12 December 1942	Empire Hawk	United Kingdom	5,032	Freighter
10th	12 December 1942	Ombillin	Netherlands	5,658	Freighter
10th	21 December 1942	Queen City	United Kingdom	4,814	Freighter, 6 killed
10th	25 December 1942	Doña Aurora	United States	5,011	Freighter, 7 killed, 2 POW
Total:				86,050	

== In command of Aliseo ==
In February 1943 Fecia di Cossato left the command of Tazzoli, was promoted to commander and was then given command of the brand new Ciclone-class torpedo boat Aliseo and of the 3rd Torpedo Boat Squadron. He assumed command of Aliseo on 17 April 1943. In May 1943 Fecia di Cossato learned that Tazzoli, having been converted into a transport submarine, had disappeared with all hands after sailing towards the Far East; the loss of his old crew deeply affected him.

On 22 July 1943 Aliseo left Pozzuoli together with the German torpedo boat TA11 and two submarine chaser, escorting the steamers Adernò and Colleville towards Civitavecchia. On the morning of 23 July, the convoy was attacked by Allied aircraft; one of the attacking planes was shot down, while one of the Axis escorting planes was damaged and forced to ditch. Aliseo was strafed, and suffered minor damage to her deck and rudder. Fecia di Cossato ordered the convoy to go on, then Aliseo took the ditched plane in tow and towed it towards the coast, while the damage to the rudder was repaired; Aliseo rejoined the convoy at 17:30. Around 19:30, the convoy was attacked by the submarine HMS Torbay, that torpedoed Adernò, sinking her. Aliseo launched a motorboat to pick up the survivors, then hunted the attacking submarine for several hours, but without result.

Following other escort missions in the Tyrrhenian Sea, Fecia di Cossato was awarded another Bronze Medal of Military Valor by the Italian authorities, and a War Merit Cross by the German authorities.

=== The Armistice and the battle of Bastia ===
When the armistice between Italy and the Allied forces was announced, on the evening of 8 September 1943, Aliseo was moored in the harbour of Bastia, in Italian-occupied Corsica. The harbour was packed with several vessels, both Italian and German; besides Aliseo, these included her sister ship Ardito, the Italian merchant ships Sassari and Humanitas, and a small German flotilla which included the submarine chasers UJ 2203 (former French survey vessel Austral) and UJ 2219 (former Belgian yacht Insuma) and five Marinefährprahme (F 366, F 387, F 459, F 612 and F 623).

The local Italian and German commanders soon reached a "gentlemen’s agreement" according to which the German forces would be allowed to safely retreat to mainland Italy. Meanwhile, however, the German forces secretly prepared to launch a surprise attack on the Italian ships moored inside the harbour, planning to capture them. The attack started at 23:45 on 8 September, when two groups of German soldiers, after hearing a whistle (the signal to attack), stormed Ardito; the torpedo boat was heavily damaged (70 of her 180 crew were killed) and captured, and the merchant ships Sassari and Humanitas also fell into German hands.

Aliseo had just left the harbour when the German attack began.

Shortly after dawn on 9 September, a combat group of the Tenth Bersaglieri Group (10° Raggruppamento Celere Bersaglieri) staged a counterattack which led to the recapture of the port, as well as of Ardito, Sassari and Humanitas; the German flotilla was ordered to leave the harbour, but the ships were immediately fired upon by the Italian coastal batteries, which damaged UJ 2203 and some of the MFPs.

Aliseo, under the command of Fecia di Cossato, was then ordered by the port commander to attack and destroy the German units. Shortly after 7:00 the flotilla, proceeding in a column led by UJ 2203, opened fire on Aliseo, which returned fire at 7:06, from a distance of 8,300 metres (9,100 yd); at 7:30 Aliseo was hit by an 88 mm shell in the engine room and temporarily left dead in the water, but the damage was quickly repaired and the torpedo boat closed in and engaged her adversaries in succession, destroying them one after the other. At 8:20 UJ 2203, after suffering several hits, blew up; ten minutes later UJ 2219 was also destroyed when her magazines exploded. Between 8:30 and 8:35 Aliseo also sank F 366, F 459 and F 623; the corvette Cormorano intervened during the final phase of the battle and, together with Aliseo, forced F 387 and F 612 to run aground, after which they were abandoned and destroyed.

Aliseo picked up 25 German survivors, then proceeded towards Portoferraio, as ordered, together with the damaged Ardito. Elba Island had become the collection point for Italian torpedo boats, corvettes and minor ships escaping from harbours on the northern Tyrrhenian coast; Aliseo and Ardito reached Portoferrario at 17:58 on 9 September. In the morning of 11 September, Aliseo left Portoferraio along with six other torpedo boats (including sisterships Animoso, Ardimentoso, Indomito and Fortunale) and some corvettes and smaller vessels, heading for Allied-controlled Palermo, where the group arrived at 10:00 on 12 September.

The ships remained on the roads till 18 September, when they entered the harbour in order to receive water and food supplies; on 20 September they left Palermo and reached Malta, where Aliseo delivered part of the foodstuff she had been given to the Italian warships that had arrived there in the previous days. On 5 October 1943, Aliseo left Malta and returned to Italy.

For both his achievements in the Battle of the Atlantic and his victorious action off Bastia, Fecia di Cossato was awarded a Gold Medal of Military Valor.

=== Co-belligerence, insubordination, and death ===
Based in Taranto, Aliseo carried out numerous escort missions during the co-belligerence between Italy and the Allies, always under Fecia di Cossato's command. In June 1944, the new government chaired by Ivanoe Bonomi refused to swear loyalty to the king; on 22 June Fecia di Cossato, a staunch monarchist, refused in turn to swear loyalty to the new government, which he considered illegitimate. On the same day, Fecia di Cossato was relieved of command, charged with insubordination and imprisoned. His huge popularity, however, led to immediate unrest among the crews of his and other ships, who refused to put to sea and demanded that he be freed and reinstated in his role. Shortly thereafter, Fecia di Cossato was released from prison, but he was given a mandatory three months' leave.

With the armistice and the following events, Fecia di Cossato had seen the ideals that had guided him throughout his life – the Fatherland, the monarchy, the Regia Marina – crumble around him. He perceived the events of 8 September 1943 as a "shameful surrender" for the Royal Italian Navy, which, he felt, had produced no positive effects for Italy; the country was now divided and occupied by opposing foreign armies, and the armistice and the change of sides would become a stain on Italy's honour and reputation for a long time ("We have been unworthily betrayed and we discovered to have committed an ignominious act without any result"). Fecia di Cossato felt that his personal honour was stained by the surrender; furthermore, he was worried by the rumours that, despite their participation in the co-belligerence against the Germans, the surviving ships of the Italian Navy would still be handed over to the Allies at the end of the war. He was also haunted by the loss of his old crew on Tazzoli; in the letter he wrote before committing suicide, he also wrote: "For months, all I've done is think about my crew, who rest honourably at the bottom of the sea. I think that my place is with them". Since his family lived in German-occupied Northern Italy, out of his reach, he had to live in a friend's house in Naples. On 21 August 1944, as his mandatory leave was nearing its end, Fecia di Cossato wrote a last letter to his mother, explaining the reasons for his extreme gesture; on 27 August 1944 he committed suicide by shooting himself in his friend's house in Naples.

He is buried in Bologna.

== Commemoration ==
A Sauro-class submarine, commissioned in 1980 and decommissioned in 2005, was named after him.
