= HMS Phoenix (N96) =

British Parthian-class submarine

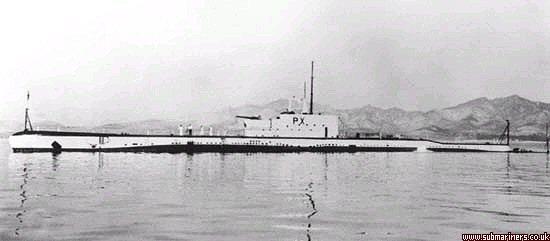

History

United Kingdom
- Name: HMS Phoenix
- Namesake: Phoenix (mythology)
- Ordered: 7 February 1928
- Builder: Cammell Laird
- Laid down: 23 July 1928
- Launched: 3 October 1929
- Commissioned: 3 February 1931
- Fate: Sunk 16 July 1940 by the Italian submarine chaser Albatros

General characteristics
- Displacement: 1,760 long tons (1,790 t) surfaced; 2,040 long tons (2,070 t) submerged
- Length: 289 ft (88 m)
- Beam: 30 ft (9.1 m)
- Draught: 16 ft (4.9 m)
- Propulsion: Diesel-electric; 2 × Admiralty diesel engines, 4,640 hp (3,460 kW); 2 × electric motors, 1,635 hp (1,219 kW); 2 shafts
- Speed: 17.5 knots (20.1 mph; 32.4 km/h) surfaced; 8.6 kn (9.9 mph; 15.9 km/h) submerged
- Endurance: 10,750 nmi (12,370 mi) at 8 knots (9.2 mph; 15 km/h) (surfaced); 70 nmi (81 mi) at 4 knots (4.6 mph; 7.4 km/h) knots (submerged)
- Test depth: 300 ft (91 m)
- Complement: 53
- Armament: 8 × 21 inch (533 mm) torpedo tubes (6 bow, 2 stern) with 14 reloads; 1 × QF 4-inch Mk XII deck gun; 2 × anti-aircraft machine guns

HMS Phoenix was a Parthian-class submarine of the Royal Navy, launched in 1929. She was the eighteenth warship of the Royal Navy to use the name Phoenix. She served on the China Station from her commissioning until the start of the Second World War. Phoenix was then relocated to the Mediterranean Sea and was sunk by the Italian torpedo boat Albatros on 16 July 1940.

== Design ==
The Parthian class was designed as an improvement of the earlier Odin class; the new class was larger, built with a raked stem, and given a shield to cover the 4-inch gun. The class had a design flaw in that the riveted external fuel tanks leaked, leaving an oil trail on the surface. Phoenix was fitted with a four-cycle blast-injection eight-cylinder diesel engine, which provided 4,640 horsepower (3,460 kW); submerged propulsion was provided by a 1,635 horsepower (1,219 kW) electric motor. Phoenix was 289 feet (88.1 m) long with a breadth of 30 feet (9.1 m) and displaced 2,040 long tons (2,070 t) of water while submerged.

All submarines of the Parthian-class were outfitted with eight 21-inch torpedo tubes, one QF 4-inch (102 mm) Mk XII deck gun, and two machine guns. The class was the first to be outfitted with the Mark VIII torpedo. Phoenix had six tubes in the bow and two tubes at the stern. Submarines of the Parthian class were designed for a complement of 53 officers and men. Phoenix had a crew of 56.

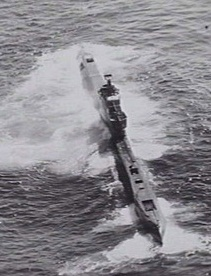
HMS Phoenix en route from China Station to the Mediterranean Sea

== History ==
Phoenix was laid down at Cammell Laird shipyard in 1928. The ship was the 18th in a series of British warships named after the mythical phoenix, and had the motto Resurgam (Latin for "I will rise again") Phoenix was originally deployed on the China Station as part of the 4th submarine flotilla. Ships of the China Station were tasked with trade protection and were used as a symbol of British power. In later September 1935, Phoenix, HMS Pandora, HMS Osiris, HMS Oswald, and the depot ship HMS Medway were ordered to travel to the Mediterranean. While in the Mediterranean, the ships participated in naval exercises including the crash dive manoeuvre. Eight months later, the small group was ordered back to Hong Kong. In April 1940, the flotilla, along with Medway, was ordered to the Mediterranean Sea to support naval operations there and the 1st submarine flotilla was established.

=== Service in the Second World War ===
Phoenix was stationed in Alexandria and patrolled the Aegean Sea and waters around the Dodecanese from 14 June to July 1940. In July 1940, Phoenix, under the command of Lt Cdr Gilbert Hugh Nowell, and Rorqual were given the task of screening a convoy of British ships bringing supplies from Malta to Alexandria. Phoenix made a contact report on 8 July after sighting the Italian battle fleet. Admiral Andrew Cunningham ordered his ships to cut off the Italian fleet from their base at Taranto, which led to the Battle of Calabria. Phoenix fired torpedoes at two Italian battleships, Giulio Cesare and Conte di Cavour, but missed both targets. While off the coast of Augusta, Sicily, Phoenix fired torpedoes at the Italian torpedo boat Albatros, but missed her. Albatros counter-attacked and sank Phoenix with depth charges. All hands were lost.

== See also ==
- Submarine warfare
- List of Allied ships lost to Italian surface vessels in the Mediterranean (1940–43)
