= Action off Bastia =

1943 naval battle of the Second World War

- Part of the Battle of the Mediterranean of the Second World War
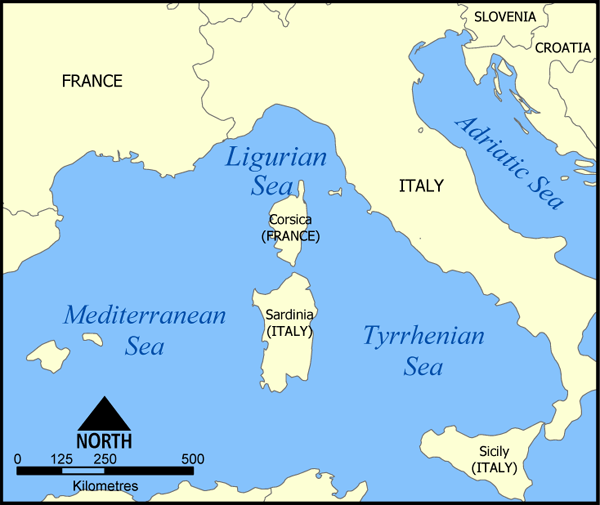
- Corsica in the Ligurian Sea
Date	9 September 1943
Location	Ligurian Sea near Bastia 42°42′03″N 09°27′01″E
Result	Italian victory

Belligerents
Kingdom of Italy	Germany

Commanders and leaders
(Kingdom of Italy) Carlo Fecia di Cossato	(Nazi Germany)

Strength
2 torpedo boats; 1 corvette; coastal artillery	2 submarine chasers; 5 Marinefährprahme; 1 captured merchant ship

Casualties and losses
70 killed; 2 torpedo boats damaged (one severely)	160 killed; 25 (POW); 2 submarine chasers sunk; 5 Marinefährprahme sunk; 1 motor boat sunk
- The French island of Corsica

The action off Bastia or battle of Bastia (battaglia di Bastia in Italian; bataille navale de Pietracorbara in French) was a naval engagement fought on 9 September 1943 between German vessels and Italian ships and coastal artillery. Bastia is the main port of Corsica in the Ligurian Sea. Secret negotiations between the Italian government and the Allies led to the Armistice of Cassibile (3 September 1943) and the defection of Italy from the Axis.

The Germans were suspicious of Italian intentions and devised Operation Achse, a coup against the Italian government and the disarming of the Italian armed forces. At midnight on 8/9 September, German marines launched an assault on Bastia harbour and captured the Italian ships moored there except for the torpedo boat Aliseo. At dawn, Italian troops counter-attacked, retook the port and the German vessels sailed to avoid capture.

Aliseo attacked the German vessels as they left port and turned north; Italian coastal guns also engaged the German vessels and when the corvette Cormorano arrived it joined the engagement. Two German submarine chasers and three Marinefährprahme (MFP, ferry barges) were sunk and two MFP were forced aground. The action was one of the first examples of Italian resistance against Nazi Germany.

== Background ==
=== Corsica in 1943 ===
Corsica was garrisoned by the VII Corps (Generale Giovanni Magli) which was short of weapons, had inadequate transport and suffered from poor morale. Order 111 CT was sent to commanders from 10–15 August and late in the month, the Army General Staff transmitted Memoria 44 to military forces outside Italy which expanded Order 111 CT preventing Italian forces from engaging in hostilities with the Germans. The Armistice of Cassibile was signed on 3 September 1943, in which the Italians withdrew from the Axis and Magli applied Memoria 44.

German forces in Corsica comprised the Brigade Reichsführer SS Sturmbrigade Reichsführer SS, a battalion of the 15th Panzergrenadier Division, two heavy coastal artillery batteries and one of heavy anti-aircraft guns. On 7 September, General Fridolin von Senger und Etterlin arrived to take command. Magli gave assurances that the Italian garrison would continue to fight against the local resistance and not oppose the arrival of German troops from Sardinia. There were about 20,000 French Maquis on the island and the Germans suspected that many of the Italians would defect.

=== Operation Achse ===
Unternehmen Achse (Operation Axis) a German plan to forestall an Italian surrender and defection to the Allies, began on 8 September and included the evacuation of the garrison of Sardinia to Corsica. When news of the Armistice was announced on 8 September, German forces began to embark from ports on the north coast of Sardinia and land at Corsican ports on the south coast. Italian coastal gunners nearby refrained from firing on the German parties.

== Prelude ==
Present in Bastia harbour were the Italian Ciclone-class torpedo boats Aliseo (Commander Carlo Fecia di Cossato) and Ardito, the Italian merchant ship Humanitas (7,980 GRT) and a MAS motor torpedo boat. German vessels present were the anti-submarine warfare vessels UJ 2203 (ex-French trawler Austral, 1,096 GRT), UJ 2219 (ex-British, Belgian-built yacht Insuma, 280 GRT), five Marinefährprahme (MFPs) F366, F387, F459, F612, F623 and the motor launch FL.B.412. German marines had prepared a surprise attack on the harbour and the Italian ships there, attacking at midnight on 8/9 September; Ardito was damaged and 70 of her 180 crew were killed. Humanitas and the MAS boat were also damaged. Aliseo managed to cast off in time and got outside the harbour, where Cossato waited for orders. After dawn on 9 September, Italian troops counter-attacked and recaptured the port, Ardito, Humanitas and the MAS.

== Action ==
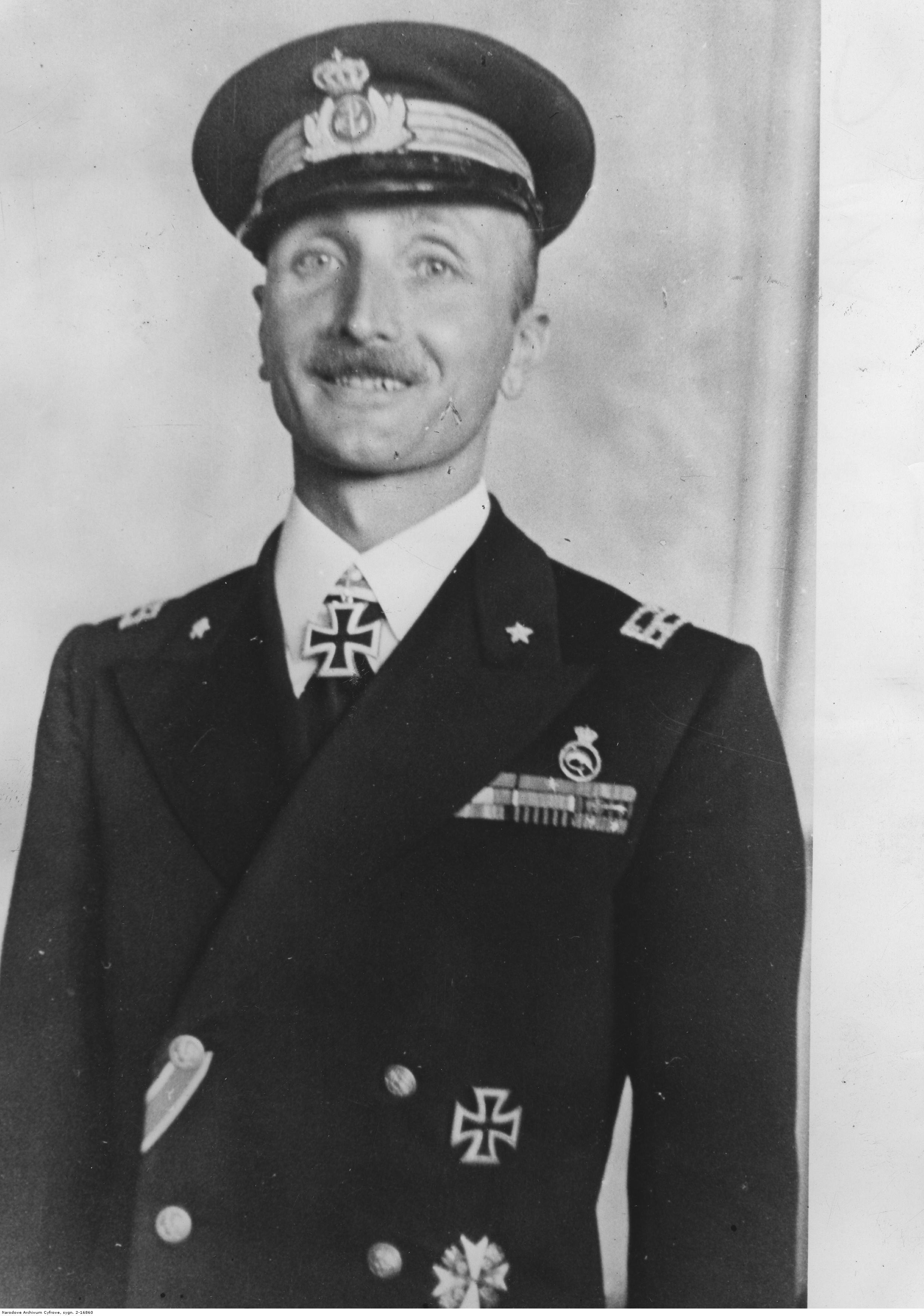
Carlo Fecia di Cossato

The Italian port commander ordered Cossato to prevent the German vessels from leaving port. As the German flotilla left harbour, in column to pass through the narrow harbour mouth, the ships were bombarded by the 76 mm guns of Italian coastal batteries, damaging UJ 2203 and some of the MFPs. There was a thin fog along the coast at dawn and the German flotilla could be seen emerging from the harbour and turning north, close to the coast. The German vessels outgunned Aliseo, the two UJ craft carrying an 88 mm gun each and the barges mounting a 75 mm gun and a 37 mm or a 20 mm gun.

Aliseo closed on the German flotilla and UJ2203 opened fire, the other vessels joining in as their guns bore on Aliseo, that zig-zagged until was 8,000 yd (7,300 m) from the German vessels, opening fire at 7:06 a.m. For 25 minutes Aliseo steamed northwards, parallel to the Germans firing at a rapid rate. At 7:30 a.m. Aliseo was hit by an 88 mm shell in the engine room and brought to a stop. Damage control repaired the boiler and plugged holes to get Aliseo under way again.

The torpedo boat closed in and engaged the German vessels one after the other. At 8:20 a.m. UJ 2203, after suffering several hits, exploded, killing nine crewmen; ten minutes later UJ 2219 was destroyed when her magazines exploded. The column of MFPs dispersed as their crews sought shelter. Machine-gun fire struck the fire director and damaged it; with the range so short, the loss of director control had little effect; the gunners on Aliseo continuing under local control.

Return fire from German 20 mm guns inflicted only superficial damage, and by 8:35 a.m. three of the MFPs had been sunk. Five minutes later, Aliseo engaged the other two MFPs, which were carrying ammunition. Shore batteries at Marina de Pietro and the corvette Cormorano, which had arrived, also fired on the MFPs and forced them to run aground. Aliseo ceased fire at 8:45 a.m. and from 10:00 and 10:50 a.m. rescued survivors, then sailed towards La Spezia, before diverting to Elba, arriving during the afternoon.

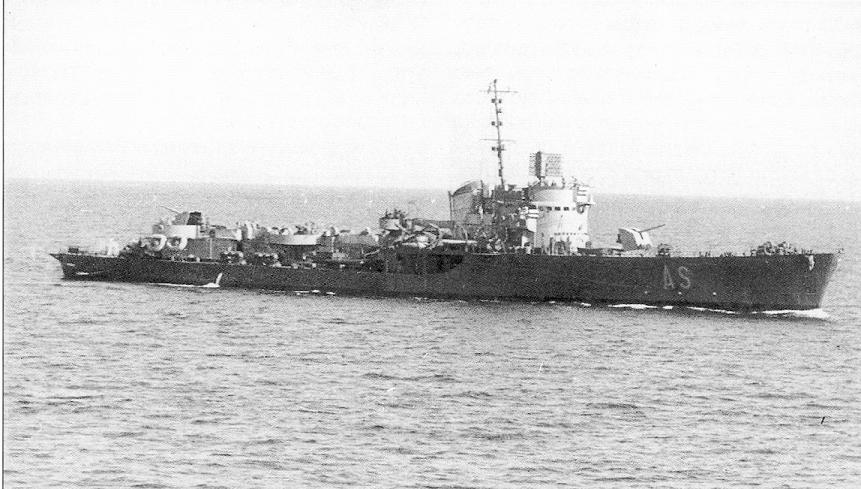
Aliseo

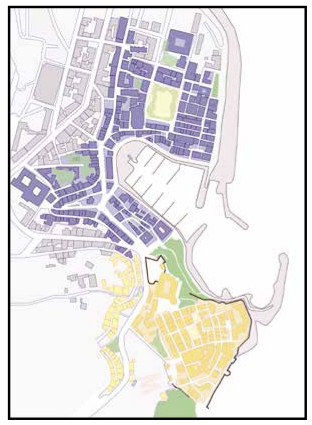
Map of Bastia harbour

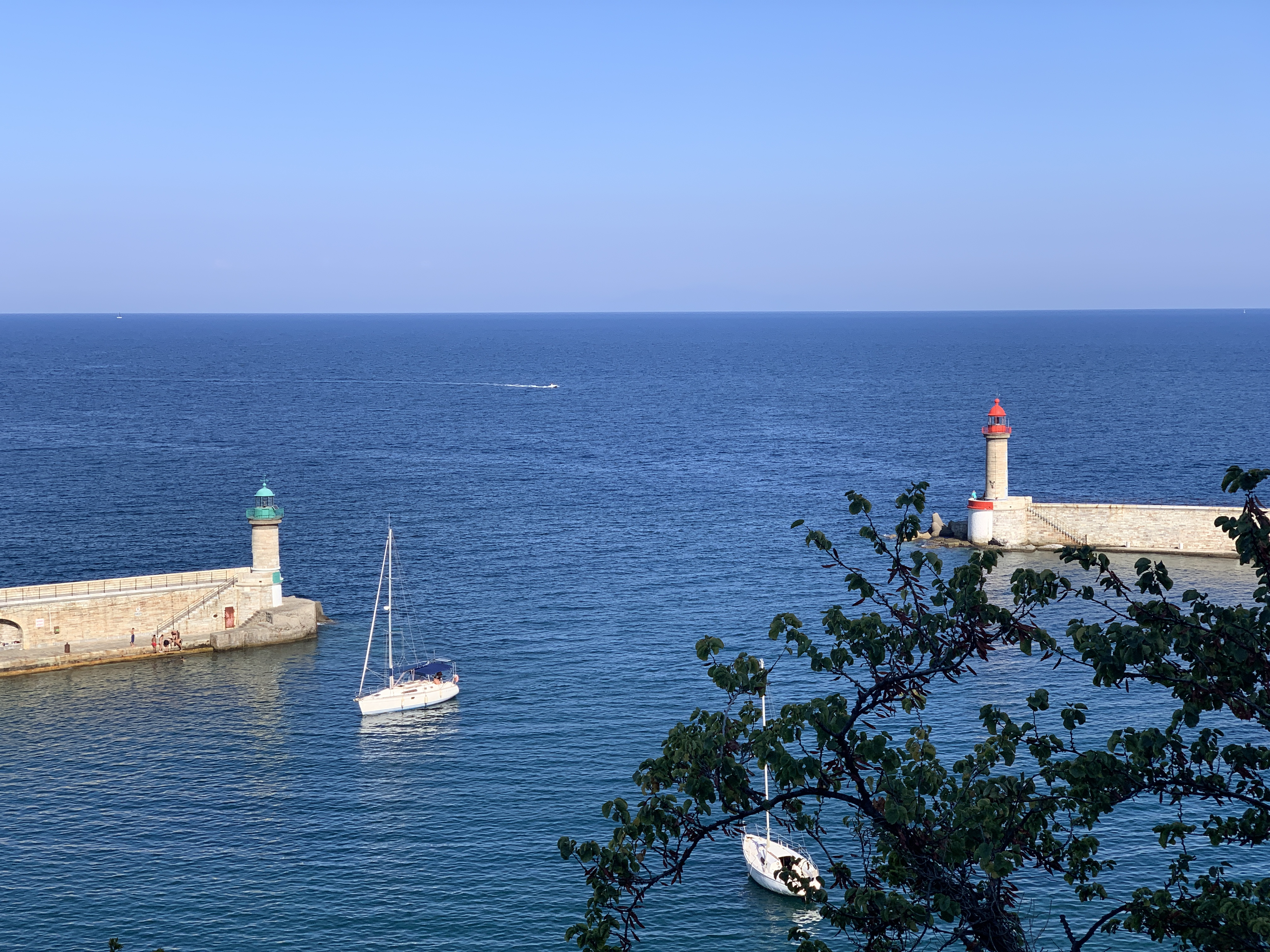
Bastia harbour mouth

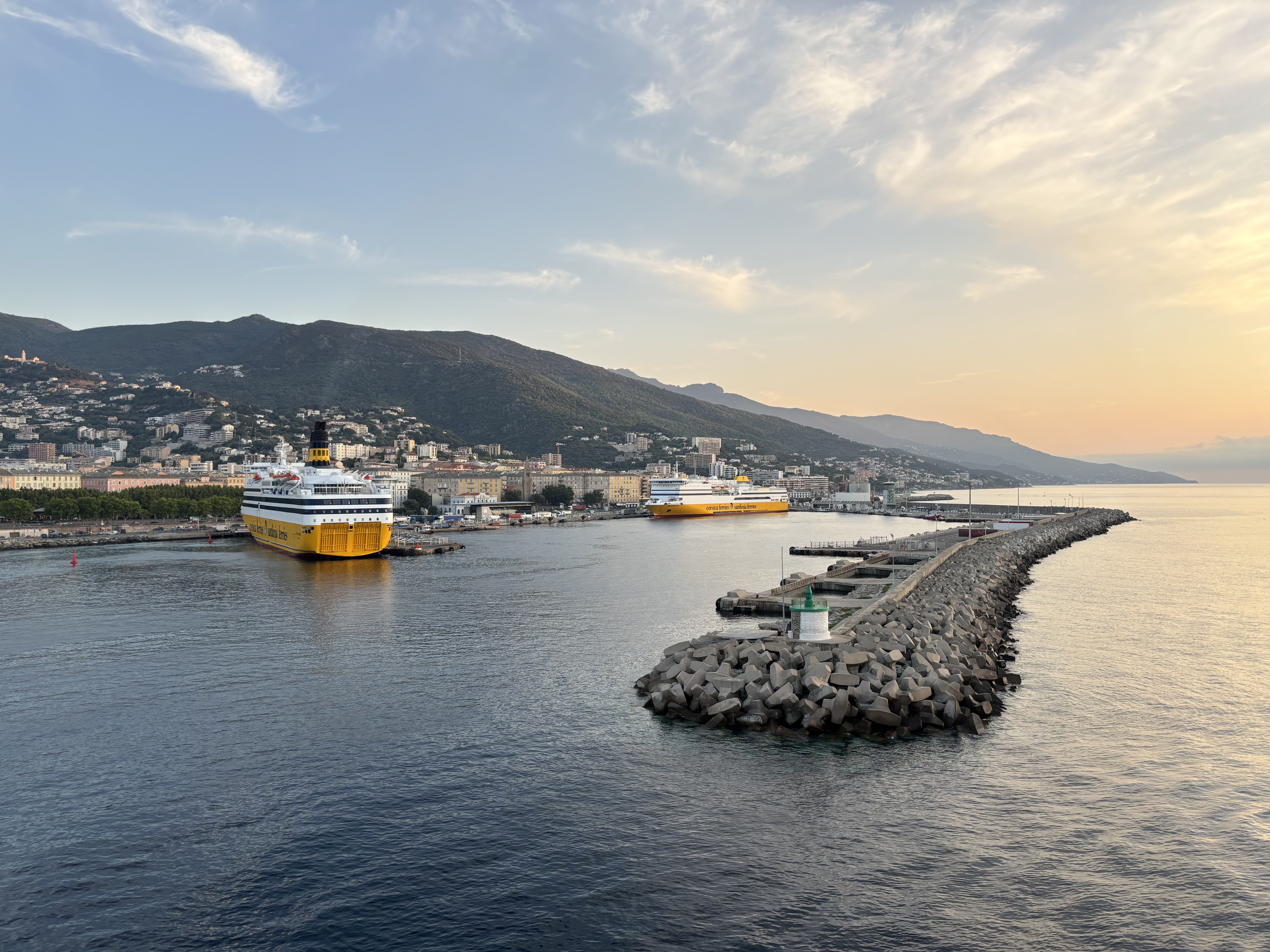
Exterior view of harbour mouth

== Aftermath ==
=== Analysis ===
In 2009, Vincent O'Hara wrote that Italian naval officers were out of contact with Supermarina after it stopped broadcasting on the evening of 10 September and were ignorant of the Armistice conditions. The skirmishing with German forces at Bastia and elsewhere was conducted under individual initiative and the Italian destroyers Legionario and Alfredo Oriani sailed from Malta on 13 September to carry an American OSS detachment and supplies from Algiers to Ajaccio to assist Free French and Italian troops fighting the Germans.

=== Casualties ===
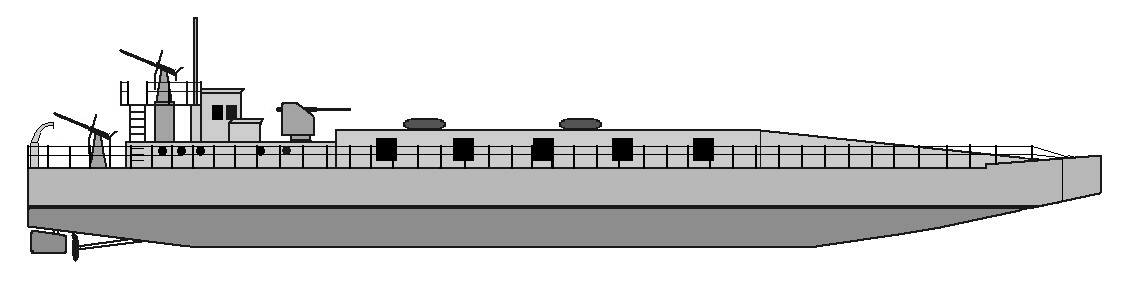
A Marinefährprahm (MFP, German naval ferry barge)

Nine men were killed on UJ2203, 160 Germans were killed in the engagement and 25 were rescued by the Italian ships. The damage suffered by Ardito later caused this ship to be left behind in Portoferraio, where she was taken over and repaired by the Germans as TA.25. The German navy reported that during the evacuation of Sardinia and Corsica it lost a J-boat, seven naval ferry barges, two anti-submarine vessels, a tug, three Siebel ferries, a peniche and three steamers of 16,943 GRT each.

== Orders of battle ==
=== Italian ships ===
Italian ships (9 September 1943)
Ship	Flag	Type	Notes
Ardito	Kingdom of Italy	Ciclone-class torpedo boat	Damaged in a German attack
Aliseo	Kingdom of Italy	Ciclone-class torpedo boat	Sailed in time to escape the German attack
Cormorano	Kingdom of Italy	Gabbiano-class corvette	On patrol outside Bastia harbour

=== German vessels ===
German vessels (9 September 1943)
Ship	Flag	Type	Notes
UJ2203	Kriegsmarine	ASW	Sunk by Aliseo
UJ2219	Kriegsmarine	ASW	Sunk by Aliseo
F366	Kriegsmarine	Marinefährprahm	Ferry barge, sunk by Aliseo
F387	Kriegsmarine	Marinefährprahm	Ferry barge, run aground
F459	Kriegsmarine	Marinefährprahm	Ferry barge, sunk by Aliseo
F612	Kriegsmarine	Marinefährprahm	Ferry barge, run aground
F623	Kriegsmarine	Marinefährprahm	Ferry barge, sunk by Aliseo
FL.B.412	Kriegsmarine	Motor launch	Sunk by Cormorano

== Bibliography ==
- Agarossi, Elena (2006) [2000]. A Nation Collapses: The Italian Surrender of September 1943. Translated by Fergusson II, Harvey (digital pbk. ed.). Cambridge: Cambridge University Press. ISBN 978-0-521-02537-9.
- Brown, David (1995) [1990]. Warship Losses of World War Two (2nd rev. ed.). London: Arms and Armour Press. ISBN 978-1-85409-278-6.
- Frieser, Karl-Heinz; Schmieder, Klaus; Schönherr, Klaus; Schreiber, Gerhard; Ungváry, Kriztián; Wegner, Bernd (2017) [2007]. The Eastern Front 1943–1944: The War in the East and on the Neighbouring Fronts. Germany and the Second World War. Vol. VIII. Translated by Smerin, Barry; Wilson, Barbara (Eng. trans. Clarendon Press, Oxford ed.). Potsdam: Militärgeschichtliches Forschungsamt (Research Institute for Military History). ISBN 978-0-19-872346-2.
  - Schreiber, Gerhard. "Part VI, the War on the Neighbouring Fronts. IV The End of the North African Campaign and the War In Italy, 1943–1945. 5. The War in Italy (September 1943 to June 1944)". In Frieser et al. (2017).
- Levano, Hervé (2014). "Austral (1941~1943) UJ-2203 (Austral) (+1943)". wrecksite.eu.
- Molony, C. J. C.; Flynn, F. C.; Davies, H. L.; Gleave, T. P. (2004a) [1973]. "Chapter XI. Naval Activities, June to October 1943; The Allied and Enemy Plans to the End of 1943 (iii) The Germans Evacuate Sardinia and Corsica". The Mediterranean and the Middle East: The Campaign in Sicily 1943 and The Campaign in Italy, 3rd September 1943 to 31st March 1944 Part I. History of the Second World War United Kingdom Military Series. Vol. V (pbk. facs. repr. Naval & Military Press, Uckfield ed.). London: HMSO. pp. 374–376. ISBN 978-1-84574-069-6.
- O'Hara, Vincent P. (2009). Struggle for the Middle Sea: The Great Navies at War in the Mediterranean Theater, 1940–1945. Annapolis, MD: Naval Institute Press. ISBN 978-1-61251-408-6.
- Robert, Alice (2025). "Atlas PALM - Insuma : Épave de navire, Période contemporaine, Haute-Corse" [Atlas PALM - Insuma: Shipwreck, Contemporary period, Haute-Corse]. Atlas PALM (in French).
- Schiavon, Nicolas (18 May 2015). "Épave de la canonnière Insuma Bastia Corse" [Wreck of the gunboat Insuma Bastia Corsica]. Deep CCR Tartiflette Team (in French). Archived from the original on 25 January 2025.
