= Italian torpedo boat Sagittario (1936) =

1936 Spica-class torpedo boat

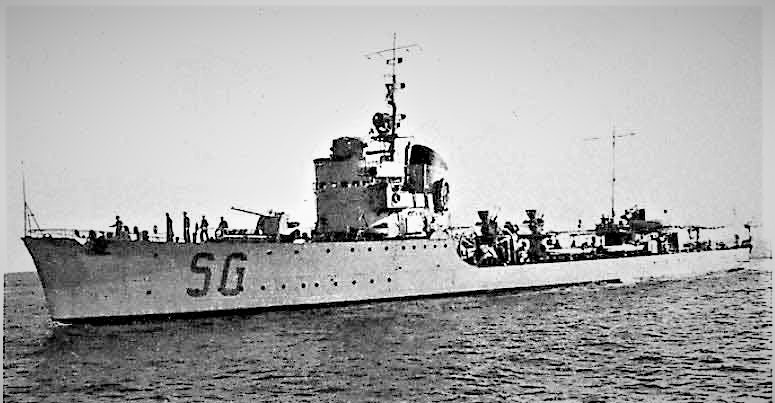
- Torpedo boat Sagittario

History

Kingdom of Italy
- Name: Sagittario
- Builder: CNQ, Fiume
- Laid down: 14 November 1935
- Launched: 21 June 1936
- Commissioned: 8 October 1936
- Decommissioned: 1 October 1964
- Reclassified: 1949
- Identification: SG/F557
- Honours and awards: Silver Medal of Military Valour
- Fate: Scrapped 1964

General characteristics
- Class & type: Spica-class torpedo boat
- Displacement: 670 long tons (680 t) standard; 1,030 long tons (1,050 t) full load
- Length: 82 m (269 ft 0 in)
- Beam: 8.2 m (26 ft 11 in)
- Draught: 2.82 m (9 ft 3 in)
- Propulsion: 2 Yarrow boilers, 2 Tosi steam turbines, 2 shafts; 19,000 hp (14,200 kW)
- Speed: 34 knots (63 km/h; 39 mph)
- Complement: 110
- Armament: 3 × 100 mm (4 in) / 47 caliber guns; 8 × 13.2 mm (0.52 in) anti-aircraft machine guns; 4 × 450 mm (18 in) torpedo tubes; 2 × DCTs; Up to 20 mines

The Italian torpedo boat Sagittario was a Spica-class torpedo boat built for the Regia Marina in 1936. During the Battle of the Mediterranean, in the Second World War, Sagittario was involved in several convoy missions, the most notable that known as the "Sagittario convoy", in the course of the Battle of Crete, for which her commander, Giuseppe Cigala Fulgosi, was awarded the Gold Medal of Military Valour. Sagittario survived the war, and was re-classified as corvette in 1949. She was scrapped in 1964.

== Construction ==
Sagittario was built in the late inter-war period by Cantieri Navali Quarnero (CNQ), Fiume, one of the Perseo sub-group of the Spica class. She was laid down on 14 November 1935, launched 21 June 1936, and commissioned 8 October 1936. Sagittario was armed with three 100 mm guns in single mounts, and four 450 mm torpedo tubes in two twin tubes; she also had two depth charge throwers and equipment for laying mines. Originally armed with eight Breda 13.2 mm AA machine guns, these were replaced with eight 20 mm Oerlikon cannons in 1941.

The Spica-class ships all were named after constellations; Sagittario was named for the constellation of Sagittarius.

== Service history ==
=== 1937–1941 ===
A few months after being commissioned into the Regia Marina, Sagittario participated in the Italian blockade of the central Mediterranean, aimed at Spanish Republican and Soviet shipping involved in the Spanish Civil War.

On 10 June 1940, when Italy declared war against the Allies, Sagittario was part of the 10th Torpedo Boat Flotilla based on La Spezia. On the night of 26 November 1940 Sagittario was on patrol in the Sicilian Straits when she spotted the Mediterranean Fleet, which was supporting Operation Collar. The encounter led to the naval engagement known as Battle of Spartivento.

On the night of 7 January 1941, Sagittario, along with other torpedo boats and destroyers, laid two minefields north of Cape Bon. On 30 March, together with her sister ships Circe, Alcione and two MAS boats, she escorted the German steamer Ruhr, torpedoed by the British submarine Utmost, while the crippled ship was towed to safety by the destroyer Dardo.

==== Action off Crete ====
On 21 May 1941 Sagittario was assigned the escort of the 2nd Motor Sailing Flotilla, a convoy of 22 Greek caïques carrying the 2nd Battalion of the 85th Mountain Regiment (II/85) from the German 5th Mountain Division from Milos to Heraklion, in support of the German paratroopers efforts in Crete. The 1st Motor Sailing Flotilla, a previous convoy bound to Maleme, suffered heavy losses and was forced to sail back the night before by Force D, a British cruiser squadron, despite the spirited defense put up by the Italian torpedo boat Lupo. News of this setback caused the recall of the 2nd Motor Sailing Flotilla, but these orders did not reach it until 09:30 on the 22nd, when the small vessels were approximately 25 miles (40 km) off Milos.

Another British cruiser squadron, Force C, comprising three cruisers and four destroyers and commanded by Rear Admiral Edward Leigh Stuart King, was meanwhile in the area, searching for a reported second German flotilla attempting to gain a foothold on Crete. Force C spotted Sagittario at 10:00. King decided to engage, but Sagittario laid a smoke screen, launched torpedoes and exchanged fire with the British force, trying to lure them away from the convoy position. Indeed, King was unaware that a major enemy convoy was ahead of his force until 11:00. Eventually, the 2nd Motor Sailing Flotilla and its escort managed to slip away undamaged. King's warships, despite their failure to destroy the German troop transports, had succeeded in forcing the Axis to abort the landing by their mere presence at sea. King, knowing that his ships were low on anti-aircraft ammunition and feeling that he had achieved his main objective, ordered Force C to withdraw. As it headed south, the cruiser Naiad was badly damaged and Carlisle set on fire by German bomber aircraft. Admiral Cunningham later criticised King, saying that the safest place during the air attack was amongst the flotilla of caïques. Sagittario fired 56 rounds for a total of 23 salvos and 10 single shots.

For this action Cigala-Fulgosi was awarded the Gold Medal of Military Valour.

=== 1942–1943 ===
On the first hours of 8 February 1942, British submarine Proteus torpedoed Sagittario without success at position 38°41′N 20°30′E, off the Greek island of Lefkada. Sagittario reacted and aimed to ram Proteus in the consequent counter-attack. Proteus turned towards Sagittario to minimize the possibility of a ram and passing alongside the port hydroplane of Proteus damaged Sagittario bow before it broke off.

Between 11 and 17 August, Sagittario took part of two successive convoys, the first escorting the Italian cargo ships Sibilla and Albachiara from Benghasi to Tobruk, and later the German merchant Menes from Tobruk to Piraeus. Both convoys dodged a torpedo attack from the British submarine Taku.

On 19 October, Sagittario rescued the survivors of the Italian destroyer Giovanni da Verrazzano, torpedoed and sunk by the British submarine Unbending.

On 30 November, Sagittario was one of the escorts of the convoy "Veloce", bound for Libya. The convoy was targeted by Fairey Albacores bombers from Malta on 2 December, and the motor vessel Veloce was hit by a torpedo and left in a sinking condition. Sagittario's sister Lupo was sunk by British Force K while rescuing survivors, while Chisone, the other merchant of the convoy, reached Tripoli the following day along with her escorts.

On 26 April 1943, Sagittario was escorting the Italian cargo ship Teramo (ex-French Marie-Therese Le Borgne) to Bizerte when the small convoy came under attack from a force of three British Fairmile motor torpedo boats, led by the commander of the 32nd MTB flotilla, Stewart Gould, aboard MTB 639. The other torpedo units were MTB 637 and MTB 633. Sagittario, assisted by the German fighter escort, beat off the torpedo charge, badly hitting MTB 639, that had engaged the Italian torpedo boat at close range with her 20 mm cannons, while her companions launched their torpedoes at the freighter without effect. MTB 639 was set ablaze and had to be scuttled by MTB 637. Gould and other six officers and ratings died in action. The Teramo was later set on fire by an Allied airstrike and abandoned before arriving in Bizerte. Sagittario shot down a B-24 bomber from the attacking force and rescued the freighter's survivors.

On 8 September, the day of the Cassibile Armistice, Sagittario was at Pola, from where she escorted the battleship Giulio Cesare to Taranto to meet Allied forces. She engaged and fought off a German U-boat off Pola which attempted to torpedo the capital ship. Later on the same month, Sagittario evacuated Italian troops from the island of Corfu.

== Post-war ==
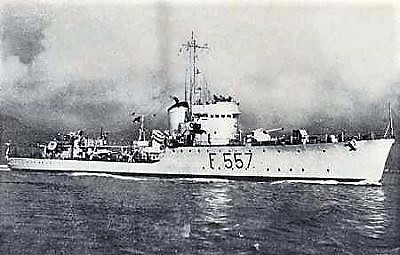
Sagittario

In 1949 Sagittario was reclassified as corvette. She lost her middle 100 mm single mounting and torpedo launchers and was fitted with six 40 mm AA cannons and an anti-submarine Hedgehog mortar. When Italy joined NATO, Sagittario's pennant number was changed to F557.

Sagittario was decommissioned on 1 October 1964 and scrapped.
