= HMS P222 =

S-class submarine

Coordinates: 40°29′00″N 14°20′00″E

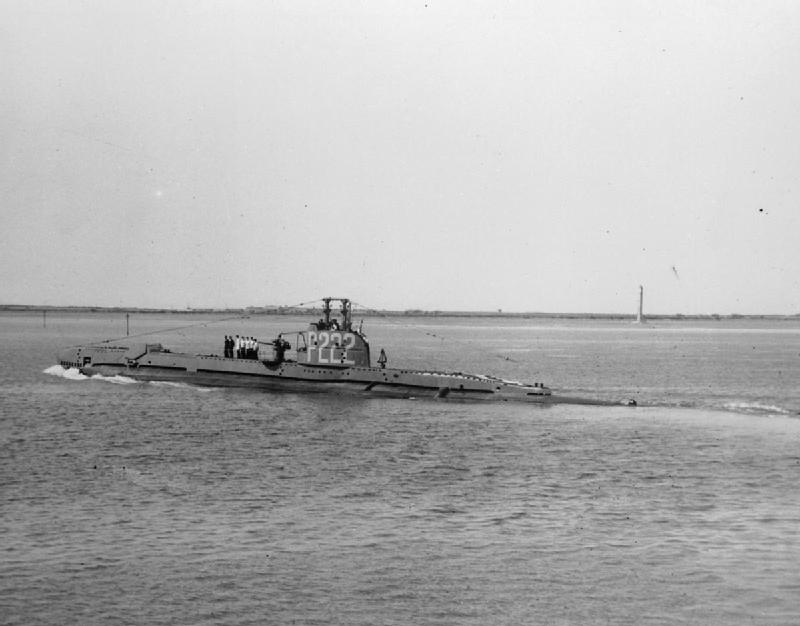
- P222 on the surface, about 1942

History

United Kingdom
- Name: P222
- Ordered: 4 April 1940
- Builder: Vickers Armstrong (Barrow in Furness, United Kingdom)
- Laid down: 10 August 1940
- Launched: 20 September 1941
- Commissioned: 4 May 1942
- Fate: Most likely sunk off Capri, 12 December 1942

General characteristics
- Class & type: S-class submarine
- Displacement: 865 long tons (879 t) (surfaced); 990 long tons (1,010 t) (submerged)
- Length: 217 ft (66.1 m)
- Beam: 23 ft 9 in (7.2 m)
- Draught: 14 ft 8 in (4.5 m)
- Installed power: 1,900 bhp (1,400 kW) (diesel); 1,300 hp (970 kW) (electric)
- Propulsion: 2 × diesel engines; 2 × electric motors
- Speed: 15 kn (28 km/h; 17 mph) (surfaced); 10 kn (19 km/h; 12 mph) (submerged)
- Range: 6,000 nmi (11,000 km; 6,900 mi) at 10 knots (19 km/h; 12 mph) (surfaced); 120 nmi (220 km; 140 mi) at 3 knots (5.6 km/h; 3.5 mph) (submerged)
- Test depth: 300 ft (91.4 m)
- Complement: 48
- Sensors & processing systems: Type 129AR or 138 ASDIC; Type 291 early-warning radar
- Armament: 6 × bow 21 in (533 mm) torpedo tubes; 1 × 3 in (76 mm) deck gun

HMS P222 was a third-batch S-class submarine built for the Royal Navy during World War II. Commissioned in 1942, the boat had an uneventful first war patrol in the Alboran Sea. She intercepted the Vichy French merchant ship SS Mitidja in July, then provided protection for an Allied convoy to Malta in Operation Pedestal the next month. The navy intended that she was to be sighted on the surface by enemy aircraft to discourage potential attacks by surface warships. Though P222 did not encounter enemy forces, the convoy arrived at its destination on 15 August after sustaining severe losses. She then reconnoitred along the coast of Algeria in advance of Operation Torch, and was attacked by a French patrol ship, but sustained no damage.

On 30 November, P222 departed Gibraltar to patrol off Naples, Italy, but failed to return at Algiers. The Italian torpedo boat Fortunale claimed to have sunk a submarine with depth charges on 12 December, south-east of Capri. This remains the most probable cause of her loss, although the sinking has never been confirmed.

== Design and description ==
The S-class submarines were intended to patrol the restricted waters of the North Sea and the Mediterranean Sea. The third batch were slightly enlarged and improved over the preceding second batch of the S class. The submarines had a length of 217 feet (66.1 m) overall, a beam of 23 feet 9 inches (7.2 m) and a draught of 14 feet 8 inches (4.5 m). They displaced 865 long tons (879 t) on the surface and 990 long tons (1,010 t) submerged. The S-class submarines had a crew of 48 officers and ratings. They had a diving depth of 300 feet (91.4 m).

For surface running, the boats were powered by two 950-brake-horsepower (708 kW) diesel engines, each driving one propeller shaft. When submerged each propeller was driven by a 650-horsepower (485 kW) electric motor. They could reach 15 knots (28 km/h; 17 mph) on the surface and 10 knots (19 km/h; 12 mph) underwater. On the surface, the third-batch boats had a range of 6,000 nautical miles (11,000 km; 6,900 mi) at 10 knots (19 km/h; 12 mph) and 120 nmi (220 km; 140 mi) at 3 knots (5.6 km/h; 3.5 mph) submerged.

P222 was armed with six 21-inch torpedo tubes in the bow. She carried six reload torpedoes for the bow tubes for a grand total of a dozen torpedoes. Twelve mines could be carried in lieu of the torpedoes. The boat was also equipped with a 3-inch (76 mm) deck gun. The third-batch S-class boats were fitted with either a Type 129AR or 138 ASDIC system and a Type 291 or 291W early-warning radar.

== Construction and career ==
Ordered on 4 April 1940 as part of the 1940 Naval Programme, P222 was laid down on 10 August by Vickers Armstrong at their shipyard in Barrow-in-Furness. She was launched on 20 September 1941. On 2 May 1942, she shifted from the builder's yard to Holy Loch, where she was commissioned two days later. The submarine was lost before a name could be given to her, she is known as "P222", her pennant number. After undergoing training, P222 arrived at Elderslie on 25 May, then sailed for Kames Bay on 1 June. From 2 to 12 June, she conducted exercises off the Clyde River area, then sailed to Gibraltar along with HMS Unruffled, arriving there on 23 June.

On 29 and 30 June, she conducted training exercises off Gibraltar with several other British ships. P222 then departed on 2 July for her first war patrol, in the Alboran Sea. She returned to port on 10 July, having sighted no enemy ships. After additional exercises, she departed Gibraltar again on 18 July with orders to patrol off the west coast of Sardinia. Her orders were changed on 23 July to intercept the Vichy French merchant ship SS Mitidja off Cape Palos, Spain. Three days later, P222 successfully intercepted and boarded her target, which was then escorted to Gibraltar by HMS Wrestler. On 28 July, the boat returned to port, ending her second war patrol.

P222 departed Gibraltar on 2 August for a patrol in the Sicilian Channel, with additional orders to provide cover for Operation Pedestal, a British convoy to carry supplies to Malta. On 13 August, along with seven other Royal Navy submarines, she accompanied the convoy on the surface; the intent was that the submarines would be sighted by enemy aircraft and discourage potential attacks from enemy warships. Though the boat did not encounter enemy forces, the convoy operation was a British strategic success, and P222 returned to Gibraltar on 22 August.

After an uneventful patrol from 1 to 19 September, the boat was ordered to conduct reconnaissance along landing beaches east of Oran, in preparation for the Allied landings in North Africa. On 8 November, she was attacked by a Vichy French Élan-class sloop, which dropped several depth charges but caused no damage. P222 returned to port on 19 November 1942.

P222 left Gibraltar to patrol off Naples on 30 November. She sent a number of messages on 7 December, but after that date no further communication was received. She failed to arrive at Algiers on her due date and was reported overdue on 21 December. The Italian torpedo boat Fortunale claimed to have sunk a submarine with depth charges on 12 December, south-east of Capri. This remains the most probable cause of the submarine's loss, but there has been no confirmation. Her wreck was claimed to have been found off Cape Negro, Tunisia, by a Belgian amateur diver, but that has not been confirmed. This last claim can be dismissed as signals to and from the submarine clearly show she was following a route that skirted the coast of southern Sardinia and thus could not have strayed in Tunisian waters.
