= Italian torpedo boat Pegaso (1936) =

Italian torpedo boat of World War II

- Torpedo boat Pegaso

History

Italy
- Name: Pegaso
- Namesake: Constellation Pegasus
- Builder: Bacini & Scali Napoletani, Naples
- Laid down: 27 April 1936
- Launched: 8 December 1936
- Commissioned: 31 March 1938
- Identification: PG
- Fate: Scuttled on 11 September 1943

General characteristics
- Class & type: Orsa-class torpedo boat
- Displacement: 840 t (830 long tons) standard; 1,016 t (1,000 long tons) normal load; 1,600 t (1,575 long tons) full load
- Length: 82.5 m (270 ft 8 in) p/p; 89.3 m (293 ft 0 in) o/a
- Beam: 9.69 m (31 ft 9 in)
- Draught: 3.1 m (10 ft 2 in); 3.74 m (12 ft 3 in) full load
- Propulsion: 2 shafts; 2 Tosi geared steam turbines; 2 three-drum boilers; 16,000 hp (11,900 kW)
- Speed: 28 knots (52 km/h; 32 mph)
- Range: 5,100 nmi (9,400 km) at 12 kn (14 mph; 22 km/h)
- Capacity: 530 t of oil
- Complement: 6 officers, 148 NCOs and sailors
- Sensors & processing systems: hydrophone
- Armament: As built: 2 × 100 mm (4 in) / 47 caliber guns; 6 × 13.2 mm (0.52 in) AA machine guns (3 twin mounts); 2 x 8mm machine guns (single mounts); 4 × 450 mm (18 in) torpedo tubes; 6 × depth charge launchers; equipment for transporting and laying 20 mines
- Notes: data taken from, Marina Militare and Trentoincina

Pegaso was an Orsa-class torpedo boat and escort aviso of the Italian Regia Marina (Royal Navy). She was one of the most successful Axis anti-submarine warships of World War II.

== Design and construction ==
The Orsa class were enlarged versions of the torpedo boats of the Spica class with greater range and endurance. Compared to the Spica class, they had significantly more anti-submarine armaments, with six depth charge launchers compared to two on the Spicas, however, they were slower and had fewer naval guns (two versus three on the Spicas).

These ships had a total length between perpendiculars of 82.5 meters (270 ft 8 in) and 89.3 meters (293 ft 0 in) overall, a beam of 9.69 meters (31 ft 9 in) and a draft of 3.1 meters (10 ft 2 in). They displaced 840 metric tons (830 long tons) at standard load and 1,600 metric tons (1,600 long tons) at full load. Their complement was 154 officers, non-commissioned officers and sailors.

The Orsa class were powered by two geared steam turbines, each driving a propeller shaft and using steam supplied by two boilers. The rated power of the turbines was 16,000 horsepower (12,000 kW) at an operating speed of 28 knots (52 km/h; 32 mph). They had a range of 5,100 nautical miles (9,400 km; 5,900 mi) at a speed of 12 knots (22 km/h; 14 mph).

Their main armament consisted of two 100 millimeters (4 in)/47-caliber OTO Model 1937 guns. The anti-aircraft (AA) defense of the Orsa-class ships as completed was provided by six 13.2 mm (0.52 in) Breda Model 1931 anti-aircraft machine guns in three twin mountings. They were fitted with four 450 mm (18 in) torpedo tubes in two twin mounts amidships. The Orsa class were also equipped with six depth charge launchers and equipment for transporting and laying up to twenty mines.

Pegaso was laid down on 27 April 1936 by the Bacini & Scali Napoletani shipyard in Naples, Italy. She was launched on 8 December 1936 and was completed and commissioned into the Regia Marina on 31 March 1938.

== Service ==
In her initial period of service the ship underwent a reclassification: already in 1938, the year of her commissioning, the ship, initially classified as an escort aviso (aviso di scorta), was reclassified as a torpedo boat (torpediniera). On 10 June 1940, the date of the Italian entry into World War II, Pegaso was part of VI Torpedo Boat Squadron at the naval base in Naples, which she formed together with her sister ships Orsa, Procione and Orione. Subsequently the formation took the name of XIV Squadron or IV Squadron.

As one of the very few ships of the Regia Marina specially designed for the task of escorting convoys (and being able to spend long periods at sea), during the Battle of the Mediterranean the ship was heavily used on the naval supply routes to North Africa. On 2 July Procione, Orsa, Orione and Pegaso escorted from Tripoli to Naples (a return route) two transport ships, Esperia and Victoria. On 6 July, Pegaso took part in the escort of the first large convoy to Italian Libya (named Operazione TCM): setting sail from Naples at 7.45pm, the convoy was made up of the troop transports Esperia and Calitea (carrying respectively 1,571 and 619 soldiers) and the modern cargo motorships Marco Foscarini, Francesco Barbaro (added on 7 July after arriving from Catania with the escort of the torpedo boats Giuseppe Cesare Abba and Rosolino Pilo) and Vettor Pisani (whose load consisted of 232 vehicles, 5,720 t, 5,630 long tons, 6,310 short tons of fuels and lubricants and 10,445 t, 10,280 long tons, 11,514 short tons of other supplies); together with the four ships of the XIV Torpedo Boat Squadron, the light cruisers Giovanni delle Bande Nere and Bartolomeo Colleoni and the X Destroyer Squadron (destroyers Maestrale, Grecale, Libeccio, and Scirocco). The ships arrived unscathed in Benghazi on 8 July.

At 06:00 19 July, Pegaso, with the ships of her squadron, left Benghazi to escort a convoy made up of merchant ships Esperia, Calitea, Marco Foscarini, Francesco Barbaro and Vettor Pisani on the return route to Naples. The convoy arrived unscathed in the Neapolitan port, shortly after midnight on 21 July. On 27 July Procione, Orsa, Orione and Pegaso acted as escort for a convoy sailing from Naples to Tripoli during the operation "Trasporti Veloce Lento" (the convoy was formed by merchant ships Maria Eugenia, Gloriastella, Mauly, Bainsizza, Col di Lana, Francesco Barbaro and Città di Bari). The escort was reinforced by the arrival of destroyers Maestrale, Grecale, Libeccio and Scirocco, and the ships arrived in port without damage on 1 August, after evading an attack by the Royal Navy submarine HMS Oswald on 30 July.

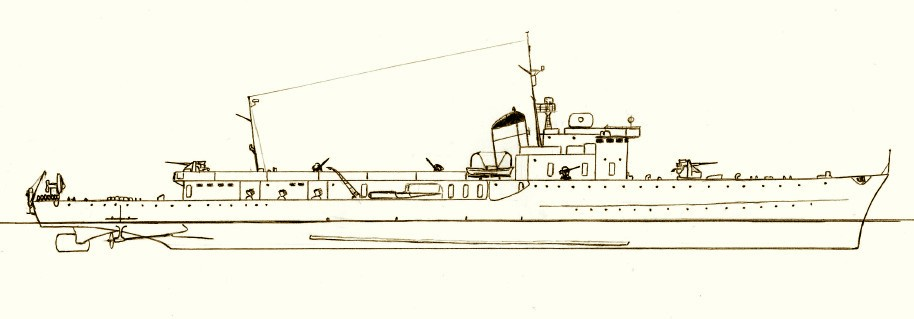
An Orsa-class torpedo boat.

On 4 January 1941 Pegaso was attacked by torpedo bomber aircraft when, departing from Tripoli, she escorted the transports Ezilda Croce and Pallade off the coast of Cape Bon: the Italian ship escaped the attacks unscathed, arriving first in Palermo (5 January) and then Naples (9 January). Between 1 and 3 March Pegaso, Orione and a third torpedo boat, Clio, escorted a convoy (steamers Amsterdam, Castellon, Maritza and Ruhr) from Naples to Tripoli carrying supplies for the Afrika Korps. The trip went smoothly. From 5 to 7 March Pegaso, Orione and the auxiliary cruiser Ramb III escorted the return convoy (Tripoli-Naples) of the steamships Castellon, Ruhr and Maritza.

From 4 to 5 May the ship, together with the destroyers Ugolino Vivaldi, Antonio da Noli and Lanzerotto Malocello and the torpedo boats Orione and Cassiopea, escorted from Naples to Tripoli a convoy made up of troop transports Victoria and Calitea and the freight ships Andrea Gritti, Barbarigo, Sebastiano Venier, Marco Foscarini and Ankara. On 12 May Pegaso left Tripoli as escort, together with the torpedo boats Orione and Clio, for the steamships Maddalena Odero and Nicolò Odero. At 20:30 on the same day, off the coast of Tripoli, Pegaso bombarded a submarine with depth charges, and then saw a large patch of oil emerge. It is possible that the British submarine HMS Undaunted was sunk in this encounter, although she could also have been lost to naval mines.

At 04:40 on 24 May she left Naples as escort, together with the destroyer Freccia and the torpedo boats Procione and Orsa, with a convoy made up of troop transports Conte Rosso, Marco Polo, Esperia and Victoria. Later the escort was reinforced by the 3rd Cruiser Division (heavy cruisers Trieste and Bolzano) with destroyers Ascari, Corazziere and Lanciere, as well as (for a short period of time, they returned to port at 19:10) torpedo boats Perseo, Calliope and Calatafimi. At 20:40 the British submarine HMS Upholder, after sighting the convoy and approaching, launched two torpedoes: they struck Conte Rosso, which sank in ten minutes, dragging 1,297 men with her. Pegaso and the other units of the escort recovered 1,432 survivors. On 26 May she sailed from Naples on escort duty to Tripoli, together with the destroyers Ugolino Vivaldi and Antonio da and the torpedo boats Cigno and Procione, the motor ships Andrea Gritti, Marco Foscarini, Sebastiano Venier, Rialto, Ankara and Barbarigo; despite the air strikes, which damaged Marco Foscarini and Sebastiano Venier, the convoy reached its destination on the 28th.

On 14 July she escorted from Tripoli to Naples, together with the destroyers Fuciliere, Alpino and Lanzerotto Malocello and the torpedo boats Orsa and Procione, the transports Rialto, Andrea Gritti, Sebastiano Venier, Barbarigo and Ankara. The British submarine HMS P33 torpedoed and sank Barbarigo and was then seriously damaged by the counterattack of the escort, while the rest of the convoy arrived in Naples on the 16th.

On 17 August she served as escort, together with the destroyers Freccia, Euro and Dardo and the torpedo boats Procione and Giuseppe Sirtori, for a convoy made up of transports Maddalena Odero, Nicolò Odero, Caffaro, Giulia, Marin Sanudo and Minatitlan. The Royal Netherlands Navy submarine O 23 torpedoed Maddalena Odero; Pegaso and Sirtori escorted the damaged ship to Lampedusa but on the 18th the freighter was finished by an air attack (the other ships of the convoy arrived safely in Tripoli on the 19th). On 22 August Pegaso and Cigno sailed from Palermo to escort to Tripoli the military transport Lussin, the steamship Alcione (towed by Lussin) and the steam tanker Alberto Fassio; on the same day the British submarine HMS Upholder torpedoed and sank Lussin off Cape San Vito. On 27 August the torpedo boat, after departing Trapani, was sent to reinforce the escort - destroyers Euro and Alfredo Oriani and torpedo boats Orsa, Procione and Clio - of a convoy formed by the steamships Ernesto and Aquitania, the motorship Col di Lana and the tanker Pozarica, sailing from Naples to Tripoli. On the same day the convoy was attacked twice by the submarine HMS Urge, which missed Pozarica but damaged Aquitania (which had to return to Trapani escorted by Orsa) and then evaded an attack by Clio; the other ships arrived at their destination on the 29th.

On 10 September the torpedo boats Pegaso, Procione, Orsa and Circe (to which Perseo was added on the 13th) and the destroyers Fulmine and Alfredo Oriani left Naples escorting a convoy (steamers Temben, Caffaro, Nicolò Odero, Nirvo, Giulia and Bainsizza) bound for Libya, which on 12 September was attacked by British Fleet Air Arm Fairey Swordfish planes of 830 Naval Air Squadron northwest of Tripoli. Caffaro sank at 34°15′N 11°54′E, while Tembien and Nicolò Odero were damaged; the latter was sunk the next day at 32°51′N 12°18′E by another air attack, after the rest of the convoy had reached Tripoli. On 29 September Pegaso and another torpedo boat, Calliope, left Naples to escort steamships Savona and Castellon to Tripoli; on 2 October the convoy came under attack by the submarine HMS Perseus which unsuccessfully attempted to torpedo Savona but struck Castellon, which sank about 10 miles (16 km) from Benghazi.

On 4 November Pegaso sailed from Brindisi to Benghazi to escort the steamships Bosforo and Savona, but four days later, having left the Adriatic Sea, the convoy was heavily attacked by the aircraft stationed on Malta: Savona was damaged and returned to Brindisi, while Pegaso and Bosforo temporarily repaired in Navarino, from where they then departed for Benghazi arriving on the 12th. On 20 November the torpedo boat left Benghazi to escort the tanker Berbera, arriving in Navarino four days later. On 29 November Pegaso left the Greek port escorting, together with the torpedo boat Aretusa, the tanker Volturno; on the same day Volturno was damaged by the aircraft stationed at Malta and forced to return to port.

On 13 December, as part of operation M 41, Pegaso left Taranto on escort duty to Benghazi, together with the destroyers Emanuele Pessagno and Antoniotto Usodimare, the motor ships Monginevro, Napoli and Vettor Pisani, however, M 41 was suspended later. On 16 December she set sail from Taranto as part of operation M 42 to escort convoy N, composed of the German motor ship Ankara, to Libya, together with the destroyer Saetta: after having sailed in a group with the convoy L bound for Tripoli (3 motor ships and 6 destroyers) on the 18th the two ships, off the coast of Misurata, separated from the formation and headed for Benghazi.

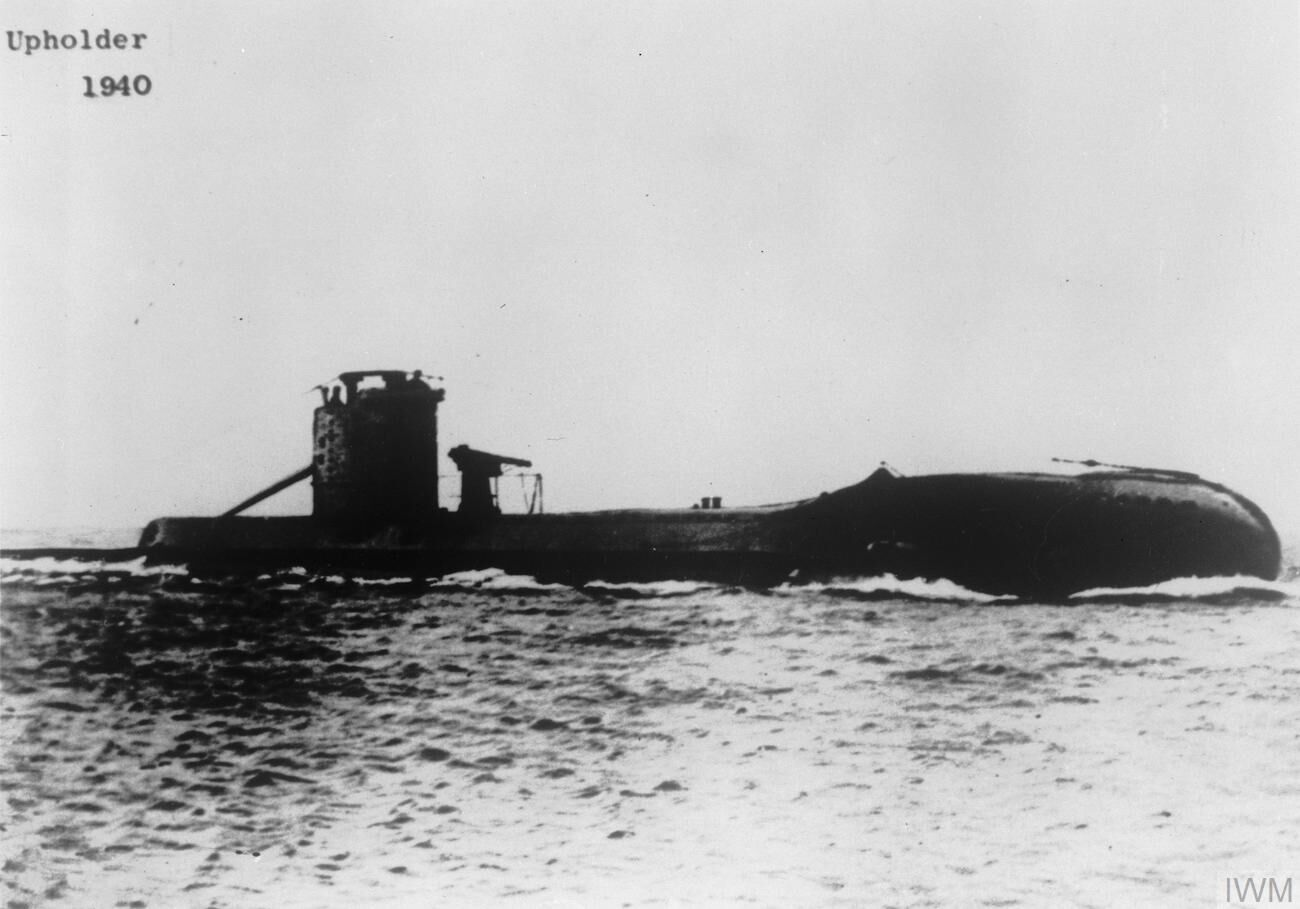
The British submarine HMS Upholder, likely sunk by Pegaso on 16 April 1942.

In April 1942 Pegaso was most probably responsible for depth charging and sinking the British submarine Upholder, which has posed a persistent threat to the Italian convoys. At 16:00 on 16 April 1942, Pegaso under the command of corvette captain Francesco Acton, received a report from a CANT Z.506 seaplane of the 170th Squadron of the 83rd Maritime Reconnaissance Group based at Augusta, who claimed to have sighted a wake likely caused by the periscope of a submarine. Pegaso then attacked, reporting that she had sunk Upholder at position 34°47′N 15°55′E. Some recent research indicates that the pilot of the plane had realized that the wake did not belong to a periscope but to a school of dolphins and that the hunt of Pegaso was in a wrong location. This research claims that the submarine was sunk by German aircraft on 14 April or was lost on a mine between 11 and 12 April instead.

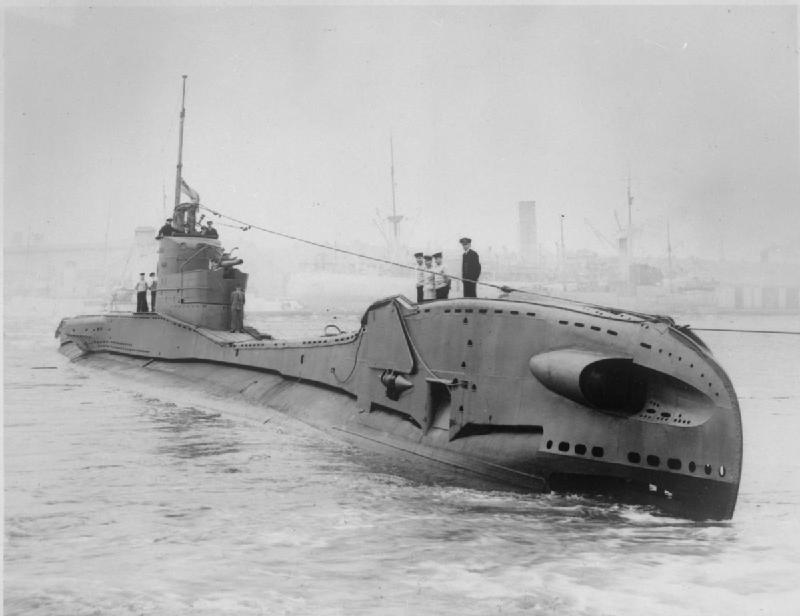
The British submarine HMS Thorn, sunk by Pegaso on 6 August 1942.

On 4 July Pegaso was escorting a convoy of three merchant ships in the Gulf of Sirte when the latter was attacked by the British submarine HMS Turbulent: no ship was hit, and likewise the torpedo boat, despite a strong counterattack with depth charges, failed to hit the enemy submarine.

At 12:30 on 6 August 1942 Pegaso was escorting a convoy about 30 miles (48 km) southwest of the islet of Gaudo (Crete), when one of the planes of the air escort was seen from aboard the torpedo boat to strafe the sea surface; four minutes later Pegaso detected a submarine under water and then made seven passes, throwing depth charges and finally losing contact: the probable result of this action was the sinking of the British submarine HMS Thorn with no survivors.

On 19 October Pegaso was escorting a convoy from Naples to Tripoli when, at 12.58, the steamship Beppe was torpedoed either by the British submarine HMS Unbending or by aircraft. Pegaso, while the attack was still continuing, towed the struck ship to Pantelleria, taking it to the protection of the anti-aircraft batteries; at that point, however, a torpedo bomber appearing from behind the hills of the island sank Beppe, frustrating all the efforts made.

In 1943 Pegaso was reclassified as an escort torpedo boat. The ship was also equipped with three 20 mm Scotti anti-aircraft machine guns, bringing her total AA armament to eleven. On 20 February Pegaso was sent to reinforce the escort of the tanker Thorsheimer (loaded with 13,000 tons of fuel) and the steamship Fabriano (with troops on board and 1,700 tons of provisions and ammunition), which left Naples for Biserta with the escort of the torpedo boats Animoso and Orione. At 19:40 on that day the convoy avoided without hits an air attack by bomber aircraft, but during the subsequent stop at Trapani a night air attack hit Fabriano, forcing her to stay in port. The tanker with the three escort torpedo boats left again in the morning of 21 February but immediately after the departure it was machine-gunned by airplanes, with the commander fatally wounded but no serious material damage; then a strong escort of 14 aircraft arrived to help (10 fighters of the Luftwaffe and 4 seaplanes of the Regia Aeronautica). At 14:25, about 20 miles (32 km) south of Marettimo, the convoy was attacked by 8 British bombers, escorted by 12 fighters: hit by two bombs (one of which, however, was a dud), Thorsheimer was immobilized with fire on board. Pegaso and Animoso provided assistance to the stricken ship, while Orione recovered her crew and then headed to Trapani; at the same time two tugs were sent from Trapani to tow the tanker. During the wait, however, around 20:00, a formation of torpedo bombers attacked Thorsheimer: after a violent battle in which three Allied (two torpedo bombers and one escort fighter) and two Axis (one German Ju 88 and one Italian CANT Z.506) aircraft were lost, the tanker was hit by one or more torpedoes and exploded.

On 3 March during an escort with the sea state 8 off the coast of Favignana, Pegaso accidentally rammed the corvette Antilope: in the collision both ships were damaged. Pegaso first returned to Trapani, then, after emergency repairs, was transferred to Venice, where in April 1943 her bow was replaced (using the parts of a corvette under construction in Monfalcone); during these repairs her hydrophones were also removed (transferred to the corvette Folaga).

In September 1943 Pegaso, under the command of frigate captain Riccardo Imperiali, served as squadron leader of the La Spezia Torpedo Boat Group, which also included the torpedo boats Impetuoso, Libra, Orsa, Ardimentoso and Orione.

== Armistice and her fate ==
After the armistice announcement, in the early morning of 9 September 1943, the ship, under the command of frigate captain Riccardo Imperiali, set sail from La Spezia together with Orsa, Orione, Ardimentoso and Impetuoso, followed, at one hour's distance, by the rest of the battle squadron (battleships Italia, Vittorio Veneto and Roma, light cruisers Attilio Regolo, Eugenio di Savoia, Raimondo Montecuccoli, destroyers Artigliere, Fuciliere, Legionario, Carabiniere, Mitragliere, Velite, Grecale, Alfredo Oriani) heading for La Maddalena. The departure took place so quickly that the supply staff of Pegaso remained on land. At 08:40 the five torpedo boats sighted the main squadron (which was also joined at 06:15 by the cruisers Emanuele Filiberto Duca d'Aosta, Luigi di Savoia Duca degli Abruzzi and Giuseppe Garibaldi and the torpedo boat Libra, coming from Genoa), placing themselves in the van with respect to it, and at 10.30, following the sighting of German reconnaissance aircraft, they came alongside it and started to zig zag. Meanwhile, around 09:00 on Pegaso a technical problem had put the VHF radio out of service, which caused her to lose contact with Orione, Libra and Ardimentoso. Shortly after midday the torpedo boats arrived in the waters facing La Maddalena but at that point Pegaso received a Morse code signal from the Cape Testa maritime signal light that the base was being occupied by the Germans; the boats therefore had to reverse course together with the rest of the fleet and headed north of Asinara. At 15:15 the formation was attacked by German Dornier Do 217 bombers: first the battleship Italia was slightly damaged (by a bomb which splashed near her hull), then, at 15.42 the battleship Roma was struck by a Fritz X guided bomb which, having gone through all the decks, exploded under the keel causing serious damage including a leak in the hull, damaging anti-aircraft guns and putting an engine room out of service (which reduced the ship's speed to 16 knots, 30 km/h, 18 mph); ten minutes later a magazine on the same ship was struck by a second bomb: devastated by a colossal explosion, Roma capsized and sank in 19 minutes, breaking in two and taking with her 1,393 men.

At 16:09 Pegaso, Impetuoso and Orsa were sent to rescue survivors, together with the destroyers Mitragliere, Fuciliere and Carabiniere and the cruiser Attilio Regolo; Impetuoso recovered 47 survivors, Orsa and Pegaso 55, Regolo 17, and the three destroyers rescued a total of 503 men. After searching in vain for more survivors, the three torpedo boats set course for the northwest, but were attacked at 19:00 by a group of German fighters and bombers, which machine-gunned and bombed them: maneuvering at high speed and firing all their anti-aircraft guns, the three ships, after narrowly avoiding several bombs, came out almost unscathed from the attack at 20:30. Pegaso and Impetuoso shot down three or four German aircraft with their own machine guns, depleting their anti-aircraft ammunition to less than half. On Pegaso four German sailors were assigned to operate a quadruple machine gun and had to fire at their own aircraft. The columns of water produced by the bombs that ended up in the sea often poured onto the ship, flooding the boiler room through the ventilation pipes. In the following hours the three torpedo boats, left isolated and without orders, tried to rejoin the Italian squadron without knowing where it was and unsuccessfully tried to rescue the destroyer Ugolino Vivaldi. During this time, both Pegaso and Impetuoso repeatedly requested information via radio from Supermarina (the Italian navy headquarters) and the other units of the squadron but did not receive any response. At 01:30 on 10 September, Pegaso and Impetuoso set course for the Spanish Balearic Islands, following Orsa which headed there after almost running out of fuel. At 07:50 a German scout plane was sighted, and at 08:37 a message was received from Supermarina ordering the ships to sail to Bona, Algeria, but given the delay in communication (which made the validity of the order uncertain), the presence of seriously wounded on board and the fact that they had now reached Minorca, the captains of the two ships decided to continue on their way, and at 11:15 they headed into the bay of Pollença.

=== Scuttling ===
After disembarking the wounded at Pollença, between 00:00 and 02:00 hours on 11 September Pegaso and Impetuoso set off to scuttle themselves: the captains of the two ships, frigate captains Riccardo Imperiali di Francavilla and Giuseppe Cigala Fulgosi, in agreement with their crews, had taken this decision to avoid having to hand over the ships to the Allies (as a consequence of the foreseeable internment on the Balearics) or to the Germans. The torpedo boats stopped in the middle of the bay, then, with the crews reduced to a minimum (17 men on Pegaso and 10 to 11 on Impetuoso), they continued until they reached deep waters over 100 meters (330 ft), sufficient to prevent a recovery of the two ships; then - between 05:00 and 06:00 hours on 11 September 1943 - they raised the combat flag, destroyed secret documents and opened portholes, shutters and sea cock valves (another measure adopted on Pegaso was to pour all the fuel left into the storage tanks on the port side, in order to increase the list), after that the captains and the men remaining on board took their places on the only two lifeboats left. After about an hour Pegaso and Impetuoso sank, stern first, one after the other: Pegaso disappeared below the surface, listing to port, dipping the stern and raising her bow (which broke at the level of the bow cannon, more or less where it had been placed a few months earlier). The sinking took 56 minutes. The lifeboat from Pegaso was towed to shore by a Spanish fishing boat.

The crews of the two ships were interned for ten months by the Spanish authorities of the Balearics, being forced to work with little food.

The wreck of Pegaso, already identified for the first time by a fisherman in 1986, was found and identified in 2001. The ship lies on the seabed at the depth of 95 meters (312 ft), lying on the port side, oriented at 160°, with the forward area and the far stern severely damaged.
