= HMS Undaunted (N55) =

Submarine of the Royal Navy

History

United Kingdom
- Name: HMS Undaunted
- Builder: Vickers Armstrongs, Barrow-in-Furness
- Laid down: 2 December 1939
- Launched: 20 August 1940
- Commissioned: 30 December 1940
- Fate: Sunk 11 May 1941
- Badge

General characteristics
- Displacement: Surfaced - 540 tons standard, 630 tons full load; Submerged - 730 tons
- Length: 58.22 m (191 feet)
- Beam: 4.90 m (16 ft 1 in)
- Draught: 4.62 m (15 ft 2 in)
- Propulsion: 2 shaft diesel-electric; 2 Paxman Ricardo diesel generators + electric motors; 615 / 825 hp
- Speed: 11.25 knots max surfaced; 10 knots max submerged
- Complement: 27-31
- Armament: 4 bow internal 21 inch (533 mm) torpedo tubes - 8 - 10 torpedoes; 1 - 3-inch (76 mm) gun

HMS Undaunted was a British U class submarine, of the second group of that class, built by Vickers Armstrongs, Barrow-in-Furness. She was laid down on 2 December 1939 and was commissioned on 30 December 1940.

== Sinking ==
Undaunted spent much of her short career operating in the Mediterranean. On 1 May 1941, she sailed from Malta to patrol off Tripoli, Libya. She was due to return to Malta on 11 May but she failed to do so and is presumed lost on mines. It is also possible that she was sunk by the Italian torpedo boat Pegaso, which had sailed from Tripoli on the 12th. Pegaso had signalled that she had attacked a submarine with depth charges and that a large patch of oil had been observed, an indication of the submarine's destruction. Against this theory is the fact that by that date Undaunted should have been back at Malta, but it is possible that a decision to remain at sea longer had been taken, or that she had suffered mechanical problems preventing her return. It is also possible that she was sunk by the Italian torpedo boat Pleiade off Tripoli on the 13th but this is not very likely.
