= Orsa-class torpedo boat =

- Torpedo boat Pegaso

Class overview
- Name: Orsa class
- Builders: Bacini & Scali Napoletani, Naples; Cantieri Navali Riuniti; Palermo yard, Palermo
- Operators: Regia Marina; Italian Navy
- In commission: 1936–1964
- Completed: 4
- Lost: 2

General characteristics
- Type: Torpedo boat
- Displacement: 840 long tons (853 t) standard; 1,575 long tons (1,600 t) full load
- Length: 82.5 m (270 ft 8 in)
- Beam: 9.69 m (31 ft 9 in)
- Draught: 3.74 m (12 ft 3 in)
- Propulsion: 2 shaft steam turbines; 2 boilers; 16,000 hp (11,900 kW)
- Speed: 28 knots (32 mph; 52 km/h)
- Complement: 116
- Electronic warfare & decoys: Sonar
- Armament: 2 × 100 mm (4 in) / 47 caliber guns; 10 × 20 mm (0.79 in) anti-aircraft guns; 8 × 13.2 mm (0.52 in) AA machine guns; 4 × 450 mm (18 in) torpedo tubes; 6 × depth charge throwers

The Orsa class (sometimes called the Pegaso class) were a group of large torpedo boats or destroyer escorts built for the Italian Navy in the late 1930s. They were an enlarged version of the Spica-class torpedo boat, specifically tailored for the escort and anti-submarine role, with greater endurance and a heavier depth charge armament but less powerful machinery and a lighter gun armament. Four were built, with two being lost during the Second World War. The surviving pair were rebuilt as anti-submarine frigates in the 1950s.

== Ships ==
Ship	builder	Launched	Operational History
Pegaso	BS Napoletani	8 December 1936	Sank British submarines HMS Upholder, HMS Undaunted, and HMS Thorn. She was part of the screen of destroyers and torpedo boats escorting a four-freighter convoy to Tripoli on 26 May 1941, when two Blenheim bombers were shot down. She also took part in the shooting down of a Beaufort bomber and a Beaufighter while escorting another convoy on 21 August 1942. Pegaso was one of the most successful Axis anti-submarine warships of World War II. Scuttled 11 September 1943
Procione	BS Napoletani	31 January 1937	Shelled British positions around Bardia on 21 and 27 December 1940. Procione took part in the rescue of survivors of the troop transport ship Conte Rosso, torpedoed and sunk on 24 May 1941 by HMS Upholder. Scuttled 11 September 1943
Orione	CNR Palermo	21 April 1937	Survived the war and served in the post-war Marina Militare. Decommissioned 1964
Orsa	CNR Palermo	21 March 1937	Along with the Spica-class Climene, she shot down three attacking British aircraft on 24 July 1942 while escorting the transport Vettor Pisani, which was beached and lost after the airstrike. Survived the war and served in the post-war Marina Militare. Decommissioned 1964
