= HMS Thorn (N11) =

Submarine of the Royal Navy

Coordinates: 34°25′0″N 22°36′0″E

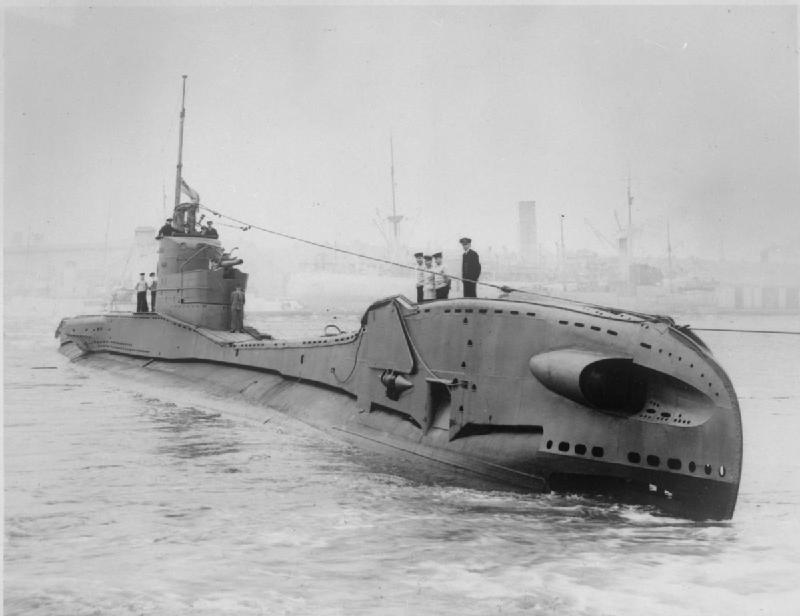
- HMS Thorn

History

United Kingdom
- Name: HMS Thorn
- Builder: Cammell Laird & Co Limited, Birkenhead
- Laid down: 20 January 1940
- Launched: 18 March 1941
- Commissioned: 26 August 1941
- Identification: Pennant number N11
- Fate: Sunk 6 August 1942
- Badge

General characteristics
- Class & type: British T class submarine
- Displacement: 1,090 tons surfaced; 1,575 tons submerged
- Length: 275 ft (84 m)
- Beam: 26 ft 6 in (8.08 m)
- Draught: 16.3 ft (5.0 m)
- Propulsion: Two shafts; Twin diesel engines 2,500 hp (1.86 MW) each; Twin electric motors 1,450 hp (1.08 MW) each
- Speed: 15.25 knots (28.7 km/h) surfaced; 9 knots (20 km/h) submerged
- Range: 4,500 nautical miles at 11 knots (8,330 km at 20 km/h) surfaced
- Test depth: 300 ft (91 m) max
- Complement: 61
- Armament: 6 internal forward-facing 21-inch (533 mm) torpedo tubes; 2 external forward-facing torpedo tubes; 3 external backward-facing torpedo tubes; 6 reload torpedoes; 1 x 4-inch (102 mm) deck gun; 3 anti-aircraft machine guns

HMS Thorn (N11) was a T-class submarine of the Royal Navy. She was laid down by Cammell Laird & Co Limited, Birkenhead and launched in March 1941.

== Career ==
Thorn had a short-lived career, serving in the Mediterranean.

Commencing operations in late 1941, Thorn sank the German tanker Campina, the Italian tanker Ninuccia, the Italian submarine Medusa, the Italian auxiliary patrol vessel AS 91 / Ottavia and the Italian transport ship Monviso. She also attacked an Italian convoy in the central Mediterranean, but failed to hit any ships.

On 6 August 1942 Thorn encountered the Italian torpedo boat Pegaso, escorting the steamer Istria from Benghazi, off southern Crete. Pegaso spotted an escorting aircraft machine-gunning the sea’s surface and moved in to investigate. Just four minutes after the aircraft’s attack the Pegaso picked up a sonar contact and carried out seven attacks after which contact was lost. Thorn failed to return from the patrol and is believed to have been lost in this attack. She was declared overdue on 11 August 1942.
