= Gabbiano-class corvette =

Class of Italian corvettes

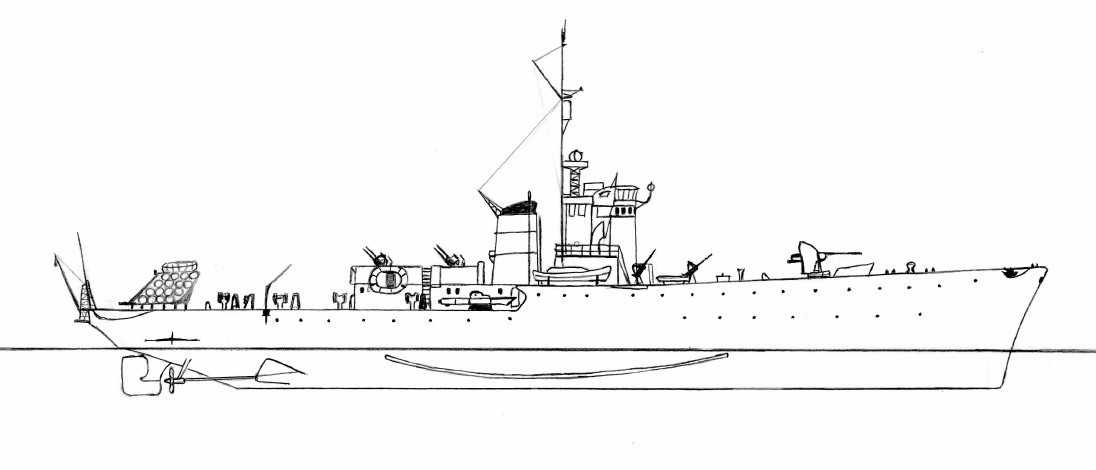

Class overview
- Name: Gabbiano
- Builders: Cantiere navale Ernesto Breda (6); Cantieri Riuniti dell'Adriatico, Monfalcone shipyard (9); Trieste shipyard (8); Cantiere Cerusa (4); Gio. Ansaldo & C. (7); Navalmeccanica (9); Odero Terni Orlando (6)
- Operators: Regia Marina; Kriegsmarine; Italian Navy
- Built: 1939–1943
- In commission: 1940–1972
- Planned: 60
- Completed: 49
- Retired: 14

General characteristics
- Type: Corvette
- Displacement: 660 long tons (671 t) standard; 728 long tons (740 t) full load
- Length: 58.8 m (192 ft 11 in)
- Beam: 8.71 m (28 ft 7 in)
- Draught: 2.53 m (8 ft 4 in)
- Propulsion: 2 shaft Diesel; 3,500 bhp (2,600 kW)
- Speed: 18 knots (33 km/h; 21 mph)
- Range: 3,000 nmi (5,600 km; 3,500 mi) at 15 knots (28 km/h; 17 mph)
- Complement: 110
- Sensors & processing systems: Sonar and hydrophones
- Electronic warfare & decoys: Sonar
- Armament: 1 × 100 mm / 47 caliber gun; 7 × Breda Model 35 20mm anti-aircraft guns; 2 × 450 mm torpedo tubes; 10 × depth charge throwers

The Gabbiano-class corvettes were a group of 59 escort vessels built for the Regia Marina of Italy for service during the Second World War. They were built to a war-time design and intended for anti-submarine and escort duties.

== Design ==
The Gabbianos were designed to be built quickly and in large numbers and began to enter service in May 1942. The ships were fitted with sonar and hydrophones, but the Regia Marina did not consider removing features such as torpedo tubes to reduce topweight or allow the vessels to carry more anti-submarine weapons. These ships were equipped with electric 'creep' motors with an endurance of 16 nautical miles (30 km; 18 mi) at 6 knots (11 km/h; 6.9 mph) for silent running while engaged in anti-submarine searches, Overall, they were well-designed for operations in the Mediterranean and were successful in their role.

== Service ==
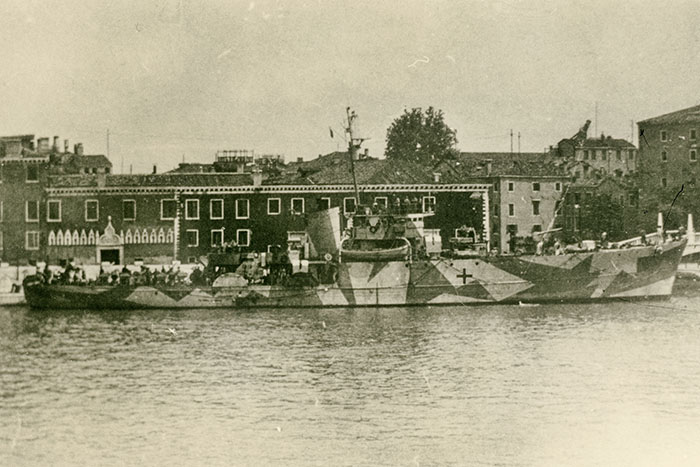
UJ-202 (ex Melpomene)

Sixty vessels were ordered, and 29 were completed by September 1943. The Kriegsmarine seized many of these vessels after the Italian surrender in 1943, and operated them under new names until the end of the war. The Germans also completed 20 vessels under construction. Fourteen vessels survived the war; the postwar Marina Militare used them as patrol vessels until 1972.

Two corvettes played important parts in Italian history: Persefone brought Mussolini, under arrest after 25 July 1943, from Gaeta to Ponza, while a short time later on 9 September 1943 Baionetta carried the Italian royal family and the Italian government with Marshall Badoglio from Pescara to Brindisi during their escape from Rome after the armistice.

== Ships ==
Construction data
| Ship | Hull no. | Builder | Launched | Operational history |
|---|---|---|---|---|
| Alce | C 23 | O.T.O. Livorno | 27 May 1942 | Completed as UJ-6084 |
| Antilope | C 19 | OTO, Livorno | 9 May 1942 | She beat off the attack of three British MTBs (MTB-77, MTB-82 and MTB-61) off Marettimo on 16 February 1943, while escorting a four-ship convoy along with her sister ship Gabbiano and the torpedo boats Sirio and Monsone. The motor torpedo boats were caught in advance by the escorts' sonar. German UJ-6082 after September 1943 |
| Ape | C 25 | Navalmeccanica | 22 November 1942 | |
| Ardea | C 54 | Ansaldo, Genoa | —N/a | UJ-2225; not completed |
| Artimede | C 39 | CRDA, Monfalcone | 9 August 1942 | German UJ-2226 |
| Baionetta | C 34 | Breda | 5 October 1942 | |
| Berenice | C 66 | CRDA, Monfalcone | 20 May 1943 | Sunk, 9 September 1943 |
| Bombarda | C 38 | Breda | 31 August 1942 | Completed as UJ-206 |
| Calabrone | C 30 | Navalmeccanica | 27 June 1943 | German; not renamed |
| Camoscio | C 21 | OTO, Livorno | 9 May 1942 | German UJ-6081; Sunk by the American destroyer USS Somers on 15 August 1944 during the Battle of Port Cros |
| Capriolo | C 22 | OTO, Livorno | 5 December 1942 | Completed as UJ-6083 |
| Carabina | C 37 | Breda | 31 August 1943 | Completed as UJ-207 |
| Cavalletta | C 31 | Navalmeccanica | 3 December 1942 | German; broken up |
| Cervo | C 56 | OTO, Livorno | —N/a | UJ-6086; not completed |
| Chimera | C 48 | CRDA, Trieste | 30 January 1943 | |
| Cicala | C 29 | Navalmeccanica | 27 June 1943 | German; not renamed |
| Clava | C 63 | Breda | | German; broken up |
| Cicogna | C 15 | Ansaldo, Genoa | 12 October 1942 | Sank the British Submarine HMS Thunderbolt (former HMS Thetis) with depth charges on 14 March 1943 off Sicily. Cicogna was bombed 24 July 1943; scuttled |
| Cocciniglia | C 61 | Navalmeccanica | | |
| Colubrina | C 35 | Breda | 7 December 1942 | Completed as UJ205 |
| Cormorano | C 13 | Cerusa | 20 September 1942 | Sank or destroyed at least three hostile German small vessels on 9 September 1943 off Bastia, Corsica. Decommissioned in 1966 |
| Crisalide | C 58 | Navalmeccanica | | |
| Danaide | C 44 | CRDA, Trieste | 21 October 1942 | |
| Daino | C 55 | OTO, Livorno | —N/a | UJ-6087; not completed |
| Driade | C 43 | CRDA, Trieste | 7 October 1942 | |
| Egeria | C 67 | CRDA, Monfalcone | | UJ-201; sunk by the Free-French destroyer Le Terrible during the Battle of Ist on 29 February 1944 |
| Euridice | C 70 | CRDA, Monfalcone | | UJ-204; not completed |
| Euterpe | C 41 | CRDA, Monfalcone | 22 October 1942 | She dealt the fatal blow to the submarine HMS Sahib on 24 April 1943. Along with sister ship Minerva sank British submarine P247 on 14 August 1943. Scuttled September 1943. |
| Farfalla | C 59 | Navalmeccanica | | |
| Fenice | C 50 | CRDA, Trieste | 1 March 1943 | |
| Flora | C 46 | CRDA, Trieste | 1 December 1942 | |
| Folaga | C 16 | Ansaldo, Genoa | 14 November 1942 | |
| Gabbiano | C 11 | Cerusa | 23 June 1942 | She repelled the attack of three British MTBs (MTB-77, MTB-82 and MTB-61) off Marettimo on 16 February 1943, while escorting a four-ship convoy along with her sister ship Antilope and the torpedo boats Sirio and Monsone. The motor torpedo boats were caught in advance by the escorts' sonar. Assisted torpedo boat Euterpe in the chase and sinking of HMS Sahib on 24 April 1943. Decommissioned 1971 |
| Gazzella | C 20 | OTO, Livorno | 9 May 1942 | Sunk by mine, 5 August 1943 |
| Grillo | C 28 | Navalmeccanica | 21 March 1943 | German; not renamed |
| Gru | C 18 | Ansaldo, Genoa | 23 December 1942 | |
| Ibis | C 17 | Ansaldo, Genoa | 12 December 1942 | |
| Libellula | C 32 | Navalmeccanica | | German; broken up |
| Lucciola | C 27 | Navalmeccanica | 21 March 1943 | |
| Marangone | C 52 | Ansaldo, Genoa | 16 September 1943 | Completed as UJ-2223 |
| Maggiolino | C 60 | Navalmeccanica | | |
| Melpomene | C 68 | CRDA, Monfalcone | 29 August 1943 | Completed as UJ-202 |
| Minerva | C 42 | CRDA, Monfalcone | 5 November 1942 | Along with sister ship Euterpe sank British submarine HMS Saracen on 14 August 1943. Decommissioned in 1970 |
| Pellicano | C 14 | Cerusa | 12 February 1943 | |
| Persefone | C 40 | CRDA, Monfalcone | 21 September 1942 | Scuttled September 1943 |
| Pomona | C 45 | CRDA, Trieste | 18 November 1942 | |
| Procellaria | C 12 | Cerusa | 4 September 1942 | |
| Renna | C 24 | OTO, Livorno | 5 December 1942 | Completed as UJ-6085 |
| Scure | C 62 | Breda | —N/a | UJ-209; not completed |
| Scimitarra | C 33 | Breda | 16 September 1942 | |
| Sfinge | C 47 | CRDA, Trieste | 9 January 1943 | |
| Sibilla | C 49 | CRDA, Trieste | 10 March 1943 | |
| Spingarda | C 36 | Breda | 22 March 1943 | Completed as UJ-208 |
| Stambecco | C 57 | OTO, Livorno | —N/a | UJ-6088; not completed |
| Strolaga | C 53 | Ansaldo, Genoa | —N/a | UJ-2224; not completed |
| Tuffetto | C 51 | Ansaldo, Genoa | 25 August 1943 | Completed as UJ-2222 |
| Tersicore | C 69 | CRDA, Monfalcone | —N/a | UJ-203; not completed |
| Urania | C 65 | CRDA, Monfalcone | 21 April 1943 | |
| Vespa | C 26 | Navalmeccanica | 22 November 1942 | German UJ-2221 after September 1943 |
| Zagaglia | C 64 | Breda | | |
