= Ciclone-class torpedo boat =

Class of Italian-built naval ships

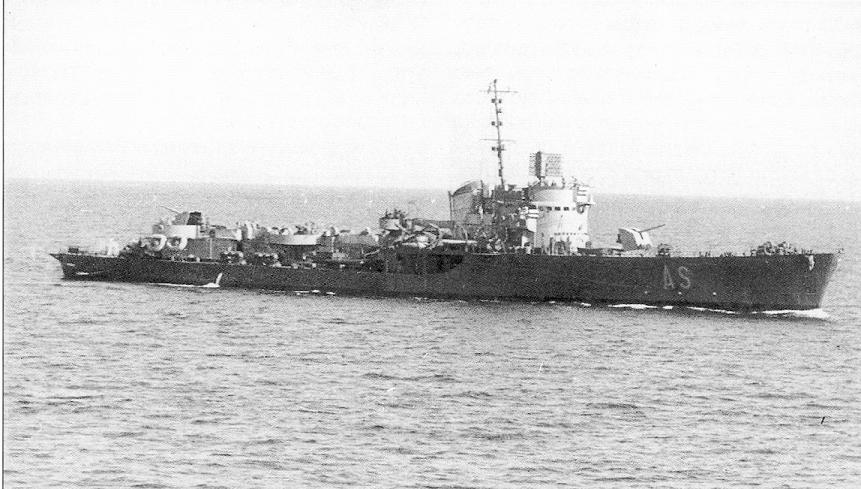
- The Ciclone-class torpedo boat Aliseo

Class overview
- Operators: Regia Marina; Kriegsmarine; Yugoslav Navy; Soviet Navy
- Built: 1941–1943
- In commission: 1942–1949
- Completed: 16
- Lost: 11

General characteristics
- Type: Torpedo boat
- Displacement: 910 long tons (925 t) standard; 1,625 long tons (1,651 t) full load
- Length: 82.5 m (270 ft 8 in) pp; 87.75 m (287 ft 11 in) oa
- Beam: 9.9 m (32 ft 6 in)
- Draught: 3.77 m (12 ft 4 in)
- Propulsion: 2 shaft steam turbines; 2 Yarrow type boilers; 16,000 hp (11,900 kW)
- Speed: 26 knots (48 km/h; 30 mph)
- Complement: 154
- Sensors & processing systems: Sonar and hydrophones
- Armament: 2 × 100 mm (4 in) / 47 caliber guns (3 guns in some ships after refit); 8 × 20 mm (0.79 in) anti-aircraft guns; 4 × 450 mm (17.7 in) torpedo tubes; 4-6 × depth charge throwers; 2 x depth charge racks

The Ciclone class were a group of torpedo boats or destroyer escorts built for the Italian Navy which fought in the Second World War. They were modified, slightly heavier, versions of the previous Orsa class, with improved stability and heavier anti-submarine armament. These ships were built as part of the Italian war mobilization programme and completed in 1942–43.

== Armament ==
All units were fitted with a sonar, and also torpedo launchers were present in the same quantity and placement for all units of the class. However, there were three different gun configurations in the class:

- Ghibli, Impavido, Impetuoso, Indomito were fitted with 3 single 100mm/47 guns, plus 4 dual 20mm/65 machine guns.
- Aliseo, Ardente, Ciclone, Fortunale, Groppo, Monsone, Tifone, Uragano with 2 single 100mm/47 guns and 8 × 20mm/65 machine guns.
- Animoso, Ardito, Ardimentoso, Intrepido with 2 single 100mm/47 guns, while the central mounting was fitted with a quadruple 20mm/65 mounting, for a total of 12 AA machine guns.

== Ships ==
Ship	Builder	Launched	Operational History
Aliseo	Navalmeccanica	20 September 1942	On 8 September 1943, Aliseo engaged and destroyed several German auxiliary vessels off Bastia, right after the Cassibile armistice. War reparation to the Yugoslav Navy, 1949 as the Biokovo
Animoso	Ansaldo, Genoa	15 April 1942	Reparation to the USSR, 1949 as destroyer Ladny (Ладный), broken up 1958, sunk as target by P-15 missile, 28 August 1959.
Ardente	Ansaldo, Genoa	27 May 1942	Sank submarine HMS P48 on 25 December 1942. Sunk in collision with the destroyer Grecale 12 January 1943
Ardimentoso	Ansaldo, Genoa	27 June 1942	Reparation to the USSR, 1949 as destroyer Liuty (Лютый), broken up 1960
Ardito	Ansaldo, Genoa	16 March 1942	She sank submarine HMS Turbulent on 6 March 1943. The vessel took part in the action off Bastia along Aliseo, but she was eventually captured by the Germans in September 1943 and served as TA26. Either sunk 15 June 1944 by US Navy PT boats or destroyed by sabotage at Rapallo on 6 July 1944
Ciclone	CRDA, Trieste	1 March 1942	She took part in the shooting down of three Beaufort bombers and a Beaufighter while escorting a convoy to Libya between 20 and 21 August 1942. Sunk by mines 8 March 1943
Fortunale	CRDA, Trieste	18 April 1942	Sank submarine HMS P222 on 12 December 1942. Reparation to the USSR, 1949 as destroyer Liotny (Лётный), sunk as target ship 1959
Ghibli	Navalmeccanica	28 February 1943	Seized by the Germans in September 1943, but not repaired. Scuttled in La Spezia 25 April 1945
Groppo	Navalmeccanica	19 April 1943	She claimed the shooting down of a Bristol Beaufort while escorting a convoy on 23 January 1943. The Italian freighter Verona was torpedoed and sunk in this action. Groppo also captured an RAF inflatable motor boat with two airmen aboard after their Lockheed Hudson bomber was shot down by German aircraft while escorting a convoy near the Skerki Banks on 22 February. Sunk 25 May 1943, by USAAF B-17 bombers at Messina
Impavido	CT Riva Trigoso	24 February 1943	Captured by the Germans in September 1943, served as TA23. Struck a mine on 25 April 1944 and finished off by British MTBs while taken in tow
Impetouso	CT Riva Trigoso	20 April 1943	Scuttled 11 September 1943
Indomito	CT Riva Trigoso	6 July 1943	War reparation to the Yugoslav Navy, 1949 as RE-51 Triglav
Intrepido	CT Riva Trigoso	8 September 1943	Captured by the Germans in September 1943, served as TA25. Sunk by US PT boats 15 July 1944
Monsone	Navalmeccanica	7 June 1942	She beat off the attack of three British MTBs off Marettimo on 16 February 1943, while escorting a four-ship convoy along with Sirio and the Gabbiano-class corvettes Gabbiano and Antilope. The motor torpedo boats were caught in advance by the escorts' sonar. Sunk 1 March 1943 at Naples by USAAF aircraft
Tifone	CRDA Trieste	31 March 1942	Close escort of the Cigno convoy on 16 April 1943, when she shepherded the transport Belluno to Trapani. As part of the same mission, she delivered aviation fuel to Bizerte. After successfully repeating the ressuply operation in the first days of May, Tifone was damaged by USAAF aircraft and scuttled at Korbous, Tunisia, on 7 May 1943
Uragano	CRDA Trieste	3 May 1942	Sunk by mines 3 February 1943

== History ==
Units of this class were heavily engaged in escort duties between Italy and Northern Africa, or in anti-submarine patrols. Some units were still incomplete when Italy signed the Armistice of Cassibile, and were sabotaged by the Italians, or captured by the Germans, completed and reclassified as "Torpedoboot Ausland" (Foreign Torpedo-boat).

Aliseo, with Carlo Fecia di Cossato in command, destroyed eight German auxiliary vessels near the port of Bastia, Corsica. For this success, di Cossato was given the highest Italian military decoration, the Gold Medal of Military Valor.

Five units survived the war, to be transferred to the USSR, Greece and Yugoslavia as reparation for war damages. None was left in service with Italian Navy.
