= List of shipwrecks in November 1941 =

The list of shipwrecks in November 1941 includes all ships sunk, foundered, grounded, or otherwise lost during November 1941.

== 1 November ==
For the loss of the Italian cargo ship Margiola on this day, see the entry for 22 October 1941

List of shipwrecks: 1 November 1941
Ship	State	Description
Bradford City	United Kingdom	World War II: The cargo ship was torpedoed and sunk in the South Atlantic (22°59′S 9°49′E) by U-68 (Kriegsmarine). Her 45 crew survived.
I-29	Soviet Navy	World War II: The KM-2 type motor launch was sunk by Luftwaffe aircraft off the Shepelevsky Lighthouse in the Gulf of Finland.
Sigrid	Sweden	World War II: The cargo ship struck a mine and sank in the Baltic Sea off Kiel, Germany with the loss of ten of her crew.
No. 72	Soviet Navy	World War II: The D-3-class motor torpedo boat was sunk by Finnish Air Force Fokker D.XXI aircraft.
No. 102	Soviet Navy	World War II: The D-3-class motor torpedo boat was sunk by Finnish Air Force Fokker D.XXI aircraft.

== 2 November ==
List of shipwrecks: 2 November 1941
Ship	State	Description
Balilla	Italy	World War II: The cargo ship was shelled and torpedoed in the Mediterranean Sea north west of Trapani, Sicily (38°22′N 12°20′E) by ORP Sokół (Polish Navy). Balilla was shelled and sunk later in the day by HMS Utmost (Royal Navy). Her 25 crew survived.
Brynmill	United Kingdom	World War II: The cargo ship was bombed and sunk in the North Sea 4 nautical miles (7.4 km) off the East Dudgeon Lightship ( Trinity House) by Luftwaffe aircraft. Her crew were rescued.
Caliph	United Kingdom	The 120.5-foot (36.7 m), 226-ton fishing trawler was bombed and sunk in the North Sea 11 nautical miles (20 km) south of the Old Head of Kinsale, Aberdeenshire by Luftwaffe aircraft with the loss of a crew member who died of wounds in the hospital on 4 November. The crew were rescued by Slebech (United Kingdom).
Foremost 45	United Kingdom	World War II: The hopper barge struck a mine and sank in the Atlantic Ocean off the coast of the Dominion of Newfoundland (51°21′10″N 51°21′06″W) with the loss of a crew member.
Larpool	United Kingdom	World War II: The cargo ship was torpedoed and sunk in the Atlantic Ocean 250 nautical miles (460 km) east south east of Cape Race, Newfoundland by U-208 (Kriegsmarine) with the loss of 26 of her 43 crew. Survivors were rescued by HMCS Bittersweet (Royal Canadian Navy) or reached land in their lifeboat.
Marie Dawn	United Kingdom	World War II: The cargo ship was bombed and damaged in the North Sea 20 nautical miles (37 km) off Spurn Point, Yorkshire by Luftwaffe aircraft. She sank the next day 4 nautical miles (7.4 km) off Spurn Point. Her 28 crew survived.
T-497 Egurcha	Soviet Navy	World War II: The auxiliary minesweeper was sunk by mines in the Tsemes Bight.
T-504 Rabotnik	Soviet Navy	World War II: The auxiliary minesweeper was sunk by Luftwaffe Junkers Ju 87 aircraft off Yalta, Crimea. At least 18 crew were killed. There were 186 survivors.
Voroshilov	Soviet Navy	World War II: The Kirov-class cruiser was bombed and severely damaged at Novorossiysk by Junkers Ju 88 aircraft of Kampfgeschwader 51, Luftwaffe. She was subsequently towed to Poti. Repairs took until February 1942 to complete.
No. 82	Soviet Navy	The D-3-class motor torpedo boat was lost on this date.

== 3 November ==
List of shipwrecks: 3 November 1941
Ship	State	Description
Anneliese	Germany	World War II: The coaster struck a mine and sank in the Baltic Sea off Dievenow.
Batavier V	Germany	World War II: The cargo ship was torpedoed and sunk in the English Channel off Cap Gris Nez, Pas-de-Calais, France by a Royal Navy motor torpedo boat.
Chelatros	Greece	The cargo ship ran aground on Brion Island, Magdalen Islands, Nova Scotia, Canada and was wrecked.
Empire Gemsbuck	United Kingdom	World War II: Convoy SC 52: The cargo ship was torpedoed and sunk in the Atlantic Ocean north east of Cape Charles, Labrador, Dominion of Newfoundland (52°18′N 53°05′W) by U-203 (Kriegsmarine). Her 43 crew were rescued by HMCS Buctouche (Royal Canadian Navy).
Everoja	United Kingdom	World War II: Convoy SC 52: The cargo ship was torpedoed and sunk in the Atlantic Ocean 80 nautical miles (150 km) east of Belle Isle, Dominion of Newfoundland (52°18′N 53°05′W) by U-203 (Kriegsmarine). Her 41 crew were rescued by HMS Nasturtium (Royal Navy).
Flynderborg	United Kingdom	World War II: Convoy SC 52: The cargo ship was torpedoed and sunk in the Atlantic Ocean (51°21′N 51°45′W) by U-202 (Kriegsmarine) with the loss of three of her 24 crew. Survivors were rescued by HMCS Windflower (Royal Canadian Navy).
Gretavale	United Kingdom	World War II: Convoy SC 52: The cargo ship was torpedoed and sunk in the Atlantic Ocean (51°21′N 51°45′W) by U-202 (Kriegsmarine) with the loss of 38 of her 44 crew. Survivors were rescued by HMCS Windflower (Royal Canadian Navy).
Kaynak Dere	Turkey	World War II: The auxiliary sailing ship was shelled and sunk south east of Cape Igneada (41°45′N 28°16′E) by ShCh-214 (Soviet Navy). Her crew were rescued by another ship.
M-511	Kriegsmarine	World War II: The Type 1916 minesweeper was sunk by a mine off Kolberg.
MO-112	Soviet Navy	World War II: Evacuation of Hanko: The MO-class guard ship was shelled and sunk by Slavnyi (Soviet Navy).
HMT Ouzel	Royal Navy	World War II: The patrol vessel struck a mine and sank in the North Sea off Mablethorpe, Lincolnshire with the loss of all hands.
Tampico	Italy	World War II: The tanker was torpedoed and severely damaged by HMS Proteus (Royal Navy). She was towed in to Venice, where she was seized by the Germans and partially dismantled.
UJ 1213 Rau IV	Kriegsmarine	World War II: The naval whaler/submarine chaser was torpedoed and sunk at Honningsvåg, Norway (70°58′N 26°58′E) by HMS Trident (Royal Navy). There were 31 dead and 10 wounded.

== 4 November ==
List of shipwrecks: 4 November 1941
Ship	State	Description
Britisher	United Kingdom	World War II: The sailing ship struck a mine and sank in the Maplin Sands, Essex with the loss of both crew.
HMS LCT 105	Royal Navy	The Landing Craft, Tank was lost in Home Waters.
HMS LCT 109	Royal Navy	The Landing Craft, Tank was lost in Home Waters.
M-58	Soviet Navy	World War II: The M-class submarine was depth charged and sunk by the destroyer NMS Regina Maria (Royal Romanian Navy).
Madjoe	Netherlands	World War II: The coaster struck a mine and sank off Port Talbot, Glamorgan, United Kingdom (51°34′38″N 3°50′30″W) with the loss of all seven people on board.
Rot-Front	Soviet Union	World War II: The cargo ship was bombed and sunk in the Kerch Strait east of Cape Takli by Luftwaffe aircraft.
Smetlivy	Soviet Navy	World War II, Soviet evacuation of Tallinn: The Gnevny-class destroyer struck three mines and sank with much loss of life.

== 5 November ==
For the loss of the German minesweeper R-158 on this date, see the entry for 21 September 1941

List of shipwrecks: 5 November 1941
Ship	State	Description
Anna Zippitelli	Italy	World War II: The cargo ship was bombed and sunk in the Mediterranean Sea west of Benghazi, Libya (31°49′N 18°25′E) by Royal Air Force aircraft with the loss of three of her 26 crew.
Empire Energy	United Kingdom	World War II: Convoy SC 52: The cargo ship ran aground at Big Brook, Dominion of Newfoundland (51°31′45.50″N 56°07′21.15″W) and was wrecked. She was on a voyage from New York, United States to Belfast, County Antrim. All crew survived. The wreck was still in situ as of 2009.
Kehi Maru	Japan	World War II: The ocean liner (4,523 GRT) struck a mine in the Sea of Japan and sank with the loss of 131 of her 510 passengers and crew.
LAT 4 Kurt Sandkamp	Kriegsmarine	World War II: The artillery support vessel was bombed and sunk in the Ems by Royal Air Force aircraft.
Marouko Pateras	Greece	World War II: Convoy SC 52: The cargo ship ran aground on Double Island, Dominion of Newfoundland. She was refloated on 5 November but sank 2 nautical miles (3.7 km) south west of Double Island.
Smetlivyi	Soviet Navy	World War II: The Gnevny-class destroyer struck a mine and sank in the Gulf of Finland. T-206 (Soviet Navy) rescued 350 survivors.
Torcello	Italy	World War II: The tanker was torpedoed and sunk in the Black Sea east of Cape Ingeada, Turkey (41°53′N 28°22′E) by ShCh-214 (Soviet Navy) with the loss of three of her 24 crew.

== 6 November ==
For the loss of HMT Flotta on this day, see the entry for 29 October 1941

List of shipwrecks: 6 November 1941
Ship	State	Description
Sapigneul	France	World War II: The fishing boat was sunk by aircraft in the Bay of Biscay with the loss of all eighteen of her crew.
SF 10	Kriegsmarine	The Siebel ferry was wrecked on this date.
No. 304	Soviet Navy	The PK-115 Type MO-2 patrol boat was lost on this date.

== 7 November ==
List of shipwrecks: 6 November 1941
Ship	State	Description
Armenia	Soviet Navy	World War II: The hospital ship was bombed and sunk in the Black Sea by Heinkel He 111 aircraft of I Staffeln, Kampfgeschwader 26, Luftwaffe. Most accounts say over 5,000 lives were lost while there were eight survivors. Recent Russian research say there were between 2,600 and 4,100 people aboard (crew, wounded, medical personnel and civilians evacuated from Yalta) and that lifeboats were launched and may have reached the shore or other Soviet ships.
Frauenburg	Germany	World War II: The cargo ship struck a mine and sank in the Baltic Sea off Ventspils, Latvia (57°26′N 21°20′E).
Gudmundrå	Sweden	World War II: Convoy WSC 53: The cargo ship ran aground on Saint Pierre Island, Saint Pierre and Miquelon and was wrecked.
Nottingham	United Kingdom	World War II: The cargo ship was torpedoed and sunk in the Atlantic Ocean (53°24′N 31°51′W) by U-74 (Kriegsmarine) with the loss of all 62 crew.
T-484 Khenkin	Soviet Navy	World War II: The auxiliary minesweeper grounded near Cape Sarych, Crimea, after running out of fuel and was burned by its crew. Her crew and the 110 troops aboard survived.

== 8 November ==
List of shipwrecks: 8 November 1941
Ship	State	Description
Castillo Oropesa	Spain	World War II: The cargo ship was torpedoed and sunk in the Mediterranean Sea off Melilla by Dandolo (Regia Marina). Her crew survived.
Cradock	United Kingdom	World War II: The 115.4-foot (35.2 m), 203-ton fishing trawler, a sold off Strath-class naval trawler, was bombed and sunk in the North Sea 14 nautical miles (26 km) north north east of St Abb's Head, Berwickshire by Luftwaffe aircraft. Her nine crew left in her lifeboat.
Flottbek	Germany	World War II: The cargo ship struck a Soviet mine and sank in the Barents Sea off Magerøya, Norway (70°56′N 25°43′E) with the loss of thirteen of the 31 people on board.
L-1	Soviet Navy	World War II: The Leninets-class submarine was shelled and sunk at Leningrad by German artillery. She was later raised, but was not repaired.
HMT Monarda	Royal Navy	World War II: The naval trawler struck a mine and sank in the Thames Estuary off Sheerness, Kent.
Victo	Norway	World War II: Convoy FN 546: The cargo ship was bombed and sunk in the North Sea off Scarborough (52°20′N 0°17′W) by Luftwaffe aircraft with the loss of two of her 32 crew. Survivors were rescued by Lottinge and Skipjack (both United Kingdom).

== 9 November ==
List of shipwrecks: 9 November 1941
Ship	State	Description
HMT Boy Andrew	Royal Navy	The naval trawler collided with another vessel in the Firth of Forth and sank with the loss of a crew member.
Buccaneer	United Kingdom	World War II: The tug was bombed and damaged in the North Sea off Montrose, Fife. She drifted ashore. She was later salvaged, repaired, and returned to service.
Conte di Misurata	Italy	World War II: Battle of the Duisburg Convoy: The tanker was shelled and sunk in the Mediterranean Sea south west of Calabria by Force K, Royal Navy.^{[Note 1]} with the loss of fourtee lives. Survivors were rescued by Alfredo Oriani, Alpino, Bersagliere, Euro, Fuciliere, and Maestrale (all Regia Marina).
Desna	Soviet Union	World War II: The cargo ship struck a mine and sank at Novorossiysk.
Duisburg	Germany	World War II: Battle of the Duisburg Convoy: The troopship was shelled and sunk in the Mediterranean Sea south west of Calabria (37°08′N 18°09′E) by Force K, Royal Navy. Survivors were rescued by Alfredo Oriani, Alpino, Bersagliere, Euro, Fuciliere, and Maestrale (all Regia Marina).
Fulmine	Regia Marina	World War II: Battle of the Duisburg Convoy: The Folgore-class destroyer was shelled and sunk in the Mediterranean Sea south west of Calabria by Force K, Royal Navy. Survivors were rescued by Alfredo Oriani, Alpino, Bersagliere, Euro, Fuciliere, and Maestrale (all Regia Marina).
HMS Lettie	Royal Navy	The tug foundered in the North Sea off St Abb's Head.
Libeccio	Regia Marina	World War II: Battle of the Duisburg Convoy: The Maestrale-class destroyer (1,615/2,208 t, 1934) was torpedoed and damaged in the Mediterranean Sea south west of Calabria (36°50′N 18°10′E) by HMS Upholder (Royal Navy). She was taken in tow by Euro but later sank.
Maria	Italy	World War II: Battle of the Duisburg Convoy: The troopship was shelled and sunk in the Mediterranean Sea south west of Calabria (37°08′N 18°09′E) by Force K, Royal Navy. Survivors were rescued by Alfredo Oriani, Alpino, Bersagliere, Euro, Fuciliere, and Maestrale (all Regia Marina).
Minatitlan	Italy	World War II: Battle of the Duisburg Convoy: The tanker was shelled and sunk in the Mediterranean Sea south west of Calabria (37°08′N 18°09′E) by Force K, Royal Navy. Survivors were rescued by Alfredo Oriani, Alpino, Bersagliere, Euro, Fuciliere, and Maestrale (all Regia Marina).
Rina Corrado	Italy	World War II: Battle of the Duisburg Convoy: The cargo ship was shelled and sunk in the Mediterranean Sea south west of Calabria (37°08′N 18°09′E) by Force K, Royal Navy with the loss of twelve of her 38 crew. Survivors were rescued by Alfredo Oriani, Alpino, Bersagliere, Euro, Fuciliere, and Maestrale (all Regia Marina). Thirteen survivors reached Albania.
Sagitta	Italy	World War II: Battle of the Duisburg Convoy: The troopship was shelled and sunk in the Mediterranean Sea south west of Calabria (37°08′N 18°09′E) by Force K, Royal Navy. Survivors were rescued by Alfredo Oriani, Alpino, Bersagliere, Euro, Fuciliere, and Maestrale (all Regia Marina).
San Marco	Germany	World War II: Battle of the Duisburg Convoy: The troopship was shelled and sunk in the Mediterranean Sea south west of Calabria (37°08′N 18°09′E) by Force K, Royal Navy. Survivors were rescued by Alfredo Oriani, Alpino, Bersagliere, Euro, Fuciliere, and Maestrale (all Regia Marina).
T-204, and T-218	Soviet Navy	The minesweepers collided in the Baltic Sea and were both beached on Hogland.
Ungvar	Hungarian River Guard	World War II: The ammunition ship exploded and sank in the Black Sea off "Ochalov", possibly a result of mines. The Kriegsmarine Danauflottilla commanding officer, five staff officers of his, sixteen Kriegsmarine gunners and twelve Hungarian crew were killed.
Vijelia and Viroful	Royal Romanian Navy	World War II: The Vosper 70'-class motor torpedo boatswere sunk in the Black Sea off "Ochalov" by the explosion of Ungvar (Hungarian River Guard), or by mines while attempting to assist her.

== 10 November ==
List of shipwrecks: 10 November 1941
Ship	State	Description
Ithaka	Kriegsmarine	World War II: The troop transport was torpedoed and sunk in the Aegean Sea off Milos, Greece by HMS Proteus (Royal Navy). There were 469 fatalities.
Norburg	Germany	World War II: The cargo ship was torpedoed and severely damaged by Glafkos II (Royal Hellenic Navy). Norburg put in to Heraklion, Crete, Greece.
Vollrath Thamm	Sweden	World War II: The cargo ship struck a mine and sank 1.5 nautical miles (2.8 km) off Hubert Gat. Her crew were rescued.

== 11 November ==
List of shipwrecks: 11 November 1941
Ship	State	Description
Ben Hann	United Kingdom	The coastal tanker (298 GRT) was reported off the Mull of Kintyre, Argyllshire whilst on a voyage from Inverness to Glasgow, Renfrewshire and then disappeared with no further trace. It is presumed she foundered. All ten crew were lost. Her wreck was identified only in 2012 off Bellochantuy.
Meridian	Panama	World War II: Convoy SC 53: The cargo ship straggled behind the convoy. She was torpedoed and sunk in the Atlantic Ocean (48°18′N 39°43′W) by U-561 (Kriegsmarine) with the loss of all 26 crew.
U-580	Kriegsmarine	The Type VIIC submarine collided with Angelburg (Kriegsmarine) and sank in the Baltic Sea off Memel, (55°45′N 20°40′E) with the loss of twelve of her 46 crew.
Vios IV	Netherlands	World War II: The 112.6-foot (34.3 m) trawler was strafed, bombed, and sunk in the North Sea off IJmuiden by Royal Canadian Air Force Lockheed Hudsons of 407 Coastal Strike Squadron. Her skipper and 2 crew killed.

== 12 November ==
List of shipwrecks: 12 November 1941
Ship	State	Description
Andrei Zhdanov	Soviet Union	World War II: The cargo ship struck a mine and sank in the Baltic Sea off Hanko, Finland. Almost all aboard were rescued. There was only one dead.
HMT Francolin	Royal Navy	World War II: The naval trawler was bombed and sunk in the North Sea off Happisburgh, Norfolk by a Dornier Do 17 aircraft from II Staffeln, Kampfgeschwader 40, Luftwaffe, which she and HMT Commander Holbrook (Royal Navy) both shot down. A crew member from HMT Francolin was killed.
Leningrad	Soviet Navy	Workl War II: The Leningrad-class destroyer struck a mine and was severely damaged off Hanko, Finland.
Maurita	United Kingdom	World War II: The coaster struck a mine and sank in the River Dee, Aberdeenshire with the loss of all five crew.
S-34	Soviet Navy	World War II: The S-class submarine was sunk by a mine of a flaking barrage laid by the minelayers NMS Amiral Murgescu and NMS Dacia (both Royal Romanian Navy).
Sovershenny	Soviet Navy	World War II: The Soobrazitelnyy-class destroyer was bombed and capsized at Sevastopol while being repaired after striking a mine while on trials in the Black Sea on 30 September 1941. Her wreck was destroyed by German Army artillery on 4 April 1942.
No. 71	Soviet Navy	The G-5-class motor torpedo boat was lost on this date.
No. 142	Soviet Navy	The G-5-class motor torpedo boat was lost on this date.

== 13 November ==
List of shipwrecks: 13 November 1941
Ship	State	Description
Aghios Nicolaos	Greece	World War II: The sailing ship struck a mine and sank in the Aegean Sea off Lesbos with the loss of all four crew.
HMS Ark Royal	Royal Navy	Ark Royal World War II: The aircraft carrier was torpedoed and damaged near Gibraltar by U-81 (Kriegsmarine). She capsized and sank the next day (36°03′N 4°45′W) with the loss of one of her 1,487 crew.
Chervona Ukraina	Soviet Navy	World War II: Siege of Sevastopol The Svetlana-class cruiser sank after being bombed and damaged in the Black Sea off Sevastopol by Junkers Ju 87 aircraft of II Staffeln, Sturzkampfgeschwader 77, Luftwaffe the previous day.
Empire Wind	United Kingdom	World War II: The cargo ship was bombed and sunk in the Atlantic Ocean (53°48′N 15°52′W) by Luftwaffe aircraft.
Joma	Netherlands	World War II: The coaster struck a mine and sank at Falmouth, Cornwall, United Kingdom with the loss of three of her crew.
Peru	United Kingdom	World War II: The cargo ship was torpedoed and sunk in the Atlantic Ocean (1°30′N 13°20′W) by U-126 (Kriegsmarine). Her 50 crew were rescued by Uniwaleco (United Kingdom).
Surovyi	Soviet Navy	World War II: The Soobrazitelny-class destroyer struck a mine and was then scuttled in the Baltic Sea off Naissaar.

== 14 November ==
List of shipwrecks: 14 November 1941
Ship	State	Description
Crusader	Panama	World War II: Convoy SC 53: The cargo ship straggled behind the convoy. She was torpedoed and sunk in the Atlantic Ocean (49°30′N 37°15′W) by U-561 (Kriegsmarine) with the loss of 33 of her 34 crew. The body of a ship's mate, who apparently survived in a lifeboat and reached ashore alive, was found on 6 January 1942 at Colonsay, Inner Hebrides, United Kingdom, fifty-four days after the sinking.
Empire Defender	United Kingdom	World War II: The cargo ship was torpedoed and sunk in the Mediterranean Sea south of La Galite Island, Tunisia, by an aerial torpedo dropped by Regia Aeronautica aircraft with the loss of four of her crew.
Empire Pelican	United Kingdom	World War II: The Design 1105 ship was bombed and sunk in the Mediterranean Sea off La Galite Island, by Regia Aeronautica aircraft with the loss of one of her 45 crew. Survivors were taken as prisoners of war.
Gordyi	Soviet Navy	World War II: The Gnevny-class destroyer struck a mine and sank in the Baltic Sea east of Hanko, Finland.
L-2	Soviet Navy	World War II: The Leninets-class submarine struck a mine and sank off Juminda, Estonia.
M-98	Soviet Navy	World War II: The M-class submarine struck a mine and sank off Juminda.
MO-301	Soviet Navy	World War II: The MO-4-class patrol boat struck a mine and sank in the Baltic Sea off Naissaar, Estonia.
Paukku	Merivoimat	The Loimu-class minelayer foundered in a storm in Koivusaari Bay off Vyborg.
Verp	Soviet Navy	World War II: The Fugas-class minesweeper struck a mine and sank east of Hanko.

== 15 November ==
List of shipwrecks: 15 November 1941
Ship	State	Description
CKA-011^{[Note 2]}	Soviet Navy	World War II: The MO-4-class patrol vessel was bombed and sunk in the Black Sea off Sevastopol by Luftwaffe aircraft.
Corhampton	United Kingdom	World War II: The cargo ship was bombed and damaged in the North Sea 26 nautical miles (48 km) off Spurn Point, Yorkshire by Luftwaffe aircraft. She was taken in tow but sank the next day. Her crew were rescued.
Gornyak	Soviet Union	The cargo ship grounded in the Black Sea off Kerch and was wrecked.
T-889	Soviet Navy	World War II: The auxiliary minesweeper was torpedoed and sunk in the Arctic Sea off Murmansk (67°30′N 41°11′E) by U-752 (Kriegsmarine) with the loss of all 43 crew.
U-583	Kriegsmarine	World War II: The Type VIIC submarine collided with U-153 (Kriegsmarine) and sank in the Baltic Sea off Danzig (55°23′N 17°05′E) with the loss of 45 of her crew.

== 16 November ==
List of shipwrecks: 16 November 1941
Ship	State	Description
Fernbank	United Kingdom	World War II: The fishing trawler was bombed and sunk in the Skaggerak off Myggenäs, Sweden by Luftwaffe aircraft with the loss of five of her crew.
Shch-211	Soviet Navy	World War II: The Shchuka-class submarine was sunk by a mine of a flaking barrage laid by the minelayers NMS Amiral Murgescu and NMS Dacia (Royal Romanian Navy).
U-433	Kriegsmarine	World War II: The Type VIIC submarine was depth charged and sunk in the Mediterranean Sea south of Málaga, Spain (36°13′N 4°42′W) by HMS Marigold (Royal Navy) with the loss of six of her 44 crew.

== 17 November ==
List of shipwrecks: 17 November 1941
Ship	State	Description
Bovey Tracey	United Kingdom	World War II: The cargo ship was bombed and sunk in the North Sea (52°58′N 2°05′E) by Luftwaffe aircraft. Her crew were rescued.
Piemonte	Italy	World War II: The ocean liner was torpedoed and damaged in the Mediterranean Sea (38°21′N 15°28′E) by HMS Umbra (Royal Navy). She was beached at Messina, Sicily Piemonte was further damaged by bombing on 4 May and 15 August 1943, when she capsized and sank. She was refloated on 24 July 1949 and scrapped.
Schwaneck	Germany	World War II: The cargo ship struck a mine and sank in the Oder off Stettin.
Stepan Makarov	Soviet Union	The icebreaker foundered in the Black Sea.
Talas	Yugoslavia	The cargo ship ran aground off Funk Island, Dominion of Newfoundland. She was refloated but consequently foundered in the Atlantic Ocean 47 nautical miles (87 km) off Cape Bonavista, Dominion of Newfoundland.
Thode Fagelund	Norway	World War II: The cargo ship was torpedoed and sunk in the Indian Ocean 35 nautical miles (65 km) east of East London, Union of South Africa by Le Heros ( (France) Vichy French Navy). Her 35 crew survived; 27 were rescued by Nahoon (United Kingdom), the other eight reached land in their lifeboat.
No. 21	Soviet Navy	The G-5-class motor torpedo boat was lost on this date.

== 18 November ==
List of shipwrecks: 18 November 1941
Ship	State	Description
Congonian	United Kingdom	World War II: The cargo ship was torpedoed and sunk in the Atlantic Ocean off the coast of Sierra Leone by U-65 (Kriegsmarine) with the loss of a crew member. (Look 18/11/1940)
Vesco	Norway	World War II: The coastal tanker was torpedoed and sunk off Kjøllefjord, Norway (70°57′N 26°50′E) by HMS Sealion (Royal Navy).
Yenice	Turkey	World War II: The cargo ship was torpedoed and sunk in the Black Sea off Vasiliko by Shch-215 (Soviet Navy) with the loss of twelve of her fourteen crew.

== 19 November ==
List of shipwrecks: 19 November 1941
Ship	State	Description
Aruba	United Kingdom	World War II: Convoy FS 650: The cargo ship was torpedoed and sunk in the North Sea off Great Yarmouth, Norfolk (52°51′N 2°07′E) by S 105 (Kriegsmarine) with the loss of a crew member.
Avanesov	Soviet Union	World War II: The tanker was torpedoed and sunk in the Aegean Sea off Cape Baba, Turkey by U-652 (Kriegsmarine) with the loss of a crew member.
Delfin 2	Kriegsmarine	The Delfin 1-class patrol boat was sunk on this date.
Del Pidio	United States	World War II: The sailing vessel struck a mine and sank off Corregidor, Philippines with the loss of six of her twelve crew.
Edridio Mindoro	United States	World War II: The ship was sunk by a mine off Mindoro, Philippines.
King	Norway	The coaster ran aground at Utklippan, Sweden. She was refloated on 23 November, but sank under tow 3 nautical miles (5.6 km) south of Utklippan.
Kormoran	Kriegsmarine	World War II: Sinking of HMAS Sydney: The auxiliary cruiser was shelled and sunk in the Indian Ocean off the coat of Western Australia by HMAS Sydney (Royal Australian Navy) with the loss of 82 of her 399 crew.
LS 3	Kriegsmarine	World War II: Sinking of HMAS Sydney: the LS 2-class schnellboot was lost when Kormoran (Kriegsmarine) was sunk.
Pitwines	United Kingdom	The coaster collided with another vessel in the North Sea off Hartlepool, County Durham and sank with the loss of a crew member.
HMAS Sydney	Royal Australian Navy	World War II: Sinking of HMAS Sydney: The Leander-class cruiser was shelled and sunk in the Indian Ocean off Western Australia by Kormoran (Kriegsmarine). All 645 crewmen were lost.
Waldinge	United Kingdom	World War II: Convoy FS 650: The cargo ship was torpedoed and damaged in the North Sea off Cromer, Norfolk (52°55′54″N 2°01′57″E) by S 41 (Kriegsmarine) with the loss of one of her 32 crew. She sank the next day. The wreck was dispersed by explosives in 1949.
War Mehtar	United Kingdom	World War II: Convoy FS 650: The tanker was torpedoed and sunk in the North Sea (52°50′N 2°08′E) by S 104 (Kriegsmarine). Her 45 crew were rescued.

== 20 November ==
List of shipwrecks: 20 November 1941
Ship	State	Description
Danubius	Romania	World War II: The lighter struck a mine and sank in the Black Sea off Ak-Mechet, Soviet Union.
Empire Dorado	United Kingdom	World War II: Convoy SC 53: The Design 1019 cargo ship collided with Theomitor ( Greece) in the Atlantic Ocean. She was taken in tow by a Royal Navy ship but sank on 22 November (57°58′N 20°38′W). All crew were rescued.
Michalis	Greece	The cargo ship ran aground in the Saint Lawrence River 6 nautical miles (11 km) upstream of Quebec City, Canada and was wrecked.
S 41	Kriegsmarine	World War II: Convoy FS 650: The schnellboot collided with S 105 (Kriegsmarine) and S 47 (Kriegsmarine): whilst attacking Convoy FS 650 in the North Sea and was damaged. She was taken in tow, but was intercepted by MGB 64 and MGB 67 (both Royal Navy) and sank before she could be captured. Three of her crew were killed.
W-2	Soviet Navy	World War II: The minesweeper struck a mine and sank in the Black Sea off Cape Galata, Bulgaria.

== 21 November ==
List of shipwrecks: 21 November 1941
Ship	State	Description
Bessheim	Norway	World War II: The cargo ship struck a mine and sank in the Barents Sea off Hammerfest, Norway. Eight German troops were killed. There were 52 survivors.
Bothnia	Sweden	The cargo ship sank at Brunsbüttel, Germany. She was a total loss.
Föhn	Nazi Germany	World War II: The tug was mined and sunk in the Baltic Sea.
HMS ML 219	Royal Navy	The Fairmile B motor launch ran aground on Stornoway and was declared a constructive total loss.
No. 35 Menzhinskiy	Soviet Navy	The auxiliary minesweeper was lost on this date.

== 22 November ==
List of shipwrecks: 22 November 1941
Ship	State	Description
Atlantis	Kriegsmarine	World War II: The auxiliary cruiser was shelled and sunk in the Atlantic Ocean off Ascension Island (4°12′S 18°24′W) by HMS Devonshire (Royal Navy) with the loss of seven of her crew. Survivors were rescued by U-126 (Kriegsmarine.
Azimut	Soviet Navy	World War II: The minelayer struck a mine and sank in the Baltic Sea off Hanko, Finland.
M 1706 Gertrud Kämpf	Kriegsmarine	World War II: The auxiliary minesweeper was mined and sunk in the Baltic Sea near Liepāja, Latvia.
Hjvb 282 Lebanon	Swedish Navy	The auxiliary patrol boat was sunk by a mine while working on a Swedish minefield off Gräsgård, Öland with the loss of ten of her eleven crew.
Maria di Giovanni	Royal Navy	The schooner ran aground at Tobruk, Libya and was wrecked. Her crew were taken as prisoners of war.
Menzhinsky	Soviet Navy	World War II: The minesweeper struck a mine and sank in the Baltic Sea off Hanko.
San Salvatore	Italy	World War II: The sailing ship was torpedoed and sunk in the Mediterranean Sea off Sardinia (41°25′N 10°42′E) by O 21 (Royal Netherlands Navy).
HMT St. Apollo	Royal Navy	The naval trawler collided with HMS Sardonyx (Royal Navy) and sank in the Atlantic Ocean off the Hebrides (59°13′N 7°41′W).
Uno	Sweden	World War II: The coastal tanker struck a mine and sank in the Baltic Sea 3 nautical miles (5.6 km) off Memel, Germany and sank with the loss of a crew member.

== 23 November ==
List of shipwrecks: 23 November 1941
Ship	State	Description
Coligny	France	World War II: The fishing trawler struck a mine laid by HMS Rorqual (Royal Navy) and sank in the Bay of Biscay 50 nautical miles (93 km) off La Rochelle, Charente-Inférieure. Six of her eight crew were killed.
HMS Glenroy	Royal Navy	World War II: The Landing Ship, Infantry was torpedoed and damaged in the Mediterranean Sea (31°40′N 26°28′E) by enemy aircraft. She was beached at Mersa Matruh, Egypt. She was refloated on 27 November and towed to Alexandria.
Hedda	Sweden	World War II: The cargo ship struck a mine and sank in the Wadden Sea north of Borkum, Germany (53°35′47″N 6°23′35″E). Her crew were rescued.
Pollux	Germany	World War II: The cargo ship struck a mine and sank off Memel.
SF 03	Kriegsmarine	The Siebel ferry foundered on this date.

== 24 November ==
List of shipwrecks: 24 November 1941
Ship	State	Description
A 13	Kriegsmarine	World War II: The transport ship was torpedoed and damaged by HMS Seawolf (Royal Navy) and was beached at Varberg, Sweden. She sank on 7 December. She was refloated in 1942, repaired and returned to service.
Blairnevis	United Kingdom	World War II: Convoy FS 654: The cargo ship was torpedoed and damaged in the North Sea by S-51 (Kriegsmarine) and was beached off Great Yarmouth, Norfolk. She was refloated on 17 December, repaired and returned to service.
HMS Dunedin	Royal Navy	World War II: The Danae-class cruiser was torpedoed and sunk in the Atlantic Ocean off Recife, Brazil (approximately 3°S 26°W) by U-124 (Kriegsmarine) with the loss of 419 of her 486 crew. Two hundred and fifty survived the sinking, but only 72 were still living when rescued by Nishmaha (United States) on 27 November, with five more deaths after they were rescued.
Groenlo	Netherlands	World War II: Convoy FS 654: The cargo ship was torpedoed and sunk in the North Sea by S-52 (Kriegsmarine) with the loss of ten of her 29 crew.
Hercules	Italy	World War II: The salvage vessel was torpedoed and sunk in Heraklion harbour, Crete, Greece by HMS Triumph (Royal Navy). There were two killed and three wounded.
T-56 Klyuz	Soviet Navy	World War II: The Udarnik-class minesweeper struck a mine and sank in the Gulf of Finland off Hanko, Finland with the loss of 160 of the 208 people aboard.
Maritza	Germany	World War II: The cargo ship was shelled and sunk in the Mediterranean Sea 100 nautical miles (190 km) west of Crete by HMS Lively and HMS Penelope (both Royal Navy). There were no survivors.
Norburg	Germany	World War II: The cargo ship was torpedoed and sunk at Heraklion by HMS Triumph (Royal Navy). She was later refloated and taken to Trieste, Italy for conversion to a Sperrbrecher, but was declared a constructive total loss in May 1945.
Procida	Germany	World War II: The cargo ship was shelled and sunk in the Mediterranean Sea 100 nautical miles (190 km) west of Crete by HMS Lively and HMS Penelope (both Royal Navy). There were no survivors.
SF 16	Kriegsmarine	The Siebel ferry was sunk by a mine in the Black Sea between Bugaz and Ochakov.
Unione	Italy	World War II: The cargo ship was torpedoed and sunk in the Mediterranean Sea (41°06′N 10°02′E) by HNLMS O-21 (Royal Netherlands Navy).
Virgilia	United Kingdom	World War II: Convoy FS 654: The tanker was torpedoed and sunk in the North Sea by S-109 (Kriegsmarine) with the loss of seventeen of her 40 crew.

== 25 November ==
List of shipwrecks: 25 November 1941
Ship	State	Description
Attilo Deffenu	Regia Marina	World War II: The armed merchant cruiser was torpedoed and sunk in the Adriatic Sea off Brindisi (40°37′N 18°27′E) by HMS Thrasher (Royal Navy). There were no casualties.
HMS Barham	Royal Navy	HMS Barham World War II: The Queen Elizabeth-class battleship was torpedoed and sunk in the Mediterranean Sea off Alexandria, Egypt (32°34′N 26°24′E) by U-331 (Kriegsmarine) with the loss of 862 of her 1,311 crew.
HMT Fisher Girl	Royal Navy	World War II: The naval drifter was sunk in the harbour of Falmouth, Cornwall by a near-miss during a Luftwaffe raid. There were no casualties.
LVII	Germany	World War II: The schooner was shelled in the Aegean Sea off Cape Maleas, Greece by HMS Thunderbolt (Royal Navy). She had aboard a German crew and 130 Greeks aboard. Only three Germans and three Greeks were rescued. The ship drifted on fire, and went aground on the east coast of Kythera.
Prosper Bihen	France	World War II: The fishing trawler was torpedoed and sunk in the North Sea off Saint-Pol-sur-Mer, Nord, France by a Royal Navy motor torpedo boat.
Tinos	Kriegsmarine	World War II: The transport ship was bombed and sunk at Benghazi, Libya by Royal Air Force aircraft. She was refloated on 23 May 1942.
V 412 Bremerhaven	Kriegsmarine	World War II: The vorpostenboot was sunk off Saint-Pol-sur Mer by a Royal Navy motor torpedo boat.
Zirona	Regia Marina	World War II: The Galeb-class minelayer was bombed by British aircraft at Benghazi and was beached.

== 26 November ==
List of shipwrecks: 26 November 1941
Ship	State	Description
Egeran	Germany	World War II: The cargo ship struck a mine and sank in the Baltic Sea off Memel.

== 27 November ==
List of shipwrecks: 27 November 1941
Ship	State	Description
Clara L-M Russ	Germany	World War II: The cargo ship was sunk at Lübeck in an Allied air raid. She was refloated in 1942, repaired and returned to service.
HR 41 Delft	Kriegsmarine	The naval trawler/Vorpostenboot was lost on this date.
HMAS Parramatta	Royal Australian Navy	World War II: The Grimsby-class sloop was torpedoed and sunk in the Mediterranean Sea off Tobruk, Libya (32°20′N 24°35′E) by U-559 (Kriegsmarine) with the loss of 138 of her 162 crew. Survivors were rescued by HMS Avon Vale (Royal Navy).
Shch-318	Soviet Navy	The Shchuka-class submarine ran aground off Hogland. She was refloated the next day with assistance from the minesweepers T-210, T-215 and T-218 (all Soviet Navy) and put back to Kronstadt for repairs.
No. 216	Soviet Navy	The MO-4-class patrol vessel was lost on this date.

== 28 November ==
List of shipwrecks: 28 November 1941
Ship	State	Description
Gerda Ferdinand	Kriegsmarine	The cargo ship ran aground and was wrecked at Argosgrund, Sweden. Her 26 crew survived.
Henny	Germany	World War II: The cargo ship struck a mine and sank in the Baltic Sea off Memel.
Ingul	Soviet Union	The cargo ship ran aground in the Black Sea off Batumi and was wrecked with the loss of four lives.
Porkkala	Finnish Navy	World War II: The Pukkio-class minelayer struck a mine and sank off Kolvisto with the loss of all 32 hands. She was raised in mid-1942, repaired and returned to service.
Priaruggia	Italy	World War II: The cargo ship was bombed and sunk at Benghazi, Libya by Royal Air Force aircraft.
U-95	Kriegsmarine	World War II: The Type VIIC submarine was torpedoed and sunk in the Mediterranean Sea east of Gibraltar (36°21′N 3°27′W) by HNLMS O-21 (Royal Netherlands Navy) with the loss of 35 of her 47 crew.
Vindafjord	Norway	World War II: The coaster was bombed and sunk whilst on a voyage between Kvitsøy and Skudeneshavn, Norway, by a Lockheed Hudson aircraft of the Royal Air Force with the loss of 34 of the 79 people on board. Survivors were rescued by Marstein (Norway).

== 29 November ==
List of shipwrecks: 29 November 1941
Ship	State	Description
Asperity	United Kingdom	World War II: Convoy FN 564: The coastal tanker was torpedoed and sunk in the North Sea (53°11′N 1°07′E) by S-64 (Kriegsmarine) with the loss of ten of her crew.
Berbera	Italy	World War II: The tanker was bombed and sunk at Navarino, Greece by Royal Air Force aircraft.
Cormarsh	United Kingdom	World War II: Convoy FN 564: The collier was torpedoed and sunk in the North Sea north west of Cromer, Norfolk (53°16′N 1°04′E) by S-51 (Kriegsmarine). Her crew were rescued.
HNoMS Egeland	Royal Norwegian Navy	The minesweeping whaler ran aground at Gaza on the coast of Palestine and was wrecked. Her crew survived the shipwreck.
Empire Newcomen	United Kingdom	World War II: Convoy FN 564: The cargo ship was torpedoed and sunk in the North Sea 5 nautical miles (9.3 km) off the Dudgeon Lightship ( Trinity House) by S-52 (Kriegsmarine) with the loss of ten of her crew.
Fiddown	United Kingdom	The coaster was run down and sunk in the Mersey Estuary by HMS Campbeltown (Royal Navy). She was refloated on 7 July 1942, repaired and returned to service as Empire Estuary in 1943.
Oktyabr	Soviet Union	The tug capsized at Sevastopol with the loss of three of her crew whilst assisting Parizhskaya Kommuna (Soviet Navy).
Parizhskaya Kommuna	Soviet Navy	The Gangut-class battleship ran aground at Sevastopol. She was refloated.
Superga	Italy	World War II: The tanker was torpedoed by Shch-211 (Soviet Navy) south of Varna, Bulgaria (43°00′N 27°53′E). She was beached to avoid sinking.
Thornliebank	United Kingdom	World War II: Convoy OS 12: The cargo ship was torpedoed and sunk in the Atlantic Ocean (41°50′30″N 29°48′00″W) by U-43 (Kriegsmarine) with the loss of all 80 people on board.
V 1611 Forst	Kriegsmarine	World War II: The vorpostenboot was torpedoed and sunk.

== 30 November ==
List of shipwrecks: 30 November 1941
Ship	State	Description
Ashby	United Kingdom	World War II: Convoy OS 12: The cargo ship straggled behind the convoy. She was torpedoed and sunk in the Atlantic Ocean (36°54′N 29°51′W) by U-43 (Kriegsmarine) with the loss of seventeen of her 50 crew. Survivors were rescued by BRP Lima (Portuguese Navy).
Capo Faro	Italy	World War II: The cargo ship was torpedoed and sunk in the Mediterranean Sea (37°28′N 19°20′E) by British aircraft based on Malta with the loss of four of the 115 people on board.
Ester	Denmark	World War II: The cargo ship was bombed and sunk in the North Sea by Royal Air Force aircraft.
N 171 Norek	Soviet Navy	The auxiliary minesweeper sank due to ice and waves while trying to tow a barge laden with food across Lake Ladoga to Leningrad.
No. 67 Izhorets 53	Soviet Navy	The auxiliary minesweeper was lost on this date.
Oktyabr	Soviet Union	World War II: The icebreaker was bombed and sunk in the Gulf of Finland by Luftwaffe aircraft.
Oluf Maersk	Denmark	World War II: The cargo ship was bombed and sunk in the North Sea west of Borkum, Germany (53°37′N 5°39′E) by Royal Air Force aircraft. Her crew survived.
Speranza	Italy	World War II: The coastal tanker was bombed and damaged at Benghazi, Libya by Royal Air Force aircraft. She was scuttled on 23 December.
Skauts	Latvia	World War II: The cargo ship was bombed and sunk in the Gulf of Finland by Luftwaffe aircraft. The wreck was scrapped in December 1944.

== Unknown date ==
List of shipwrecks: Unknown date 1941
Ship	State	Description
Aliakmon	Greece	The cargo ship foundered in the Atlantic Ocean sometime after 20 November with the loss of all hands. She was on a voyage from Loch Ewe to Sydney, Nova Scotia, Canada.
HMS LCT 110	Royal Navy	The LCT-1-class landing craft tank was lost in Home Waters.
HMS LCT 129	Royal Navy	The LCT-1-class landing craft tank was lost in November.
Proteus	Canada	The collier was lost at sea sometime after 23 November.
Shch-324	Soviet Navy	The Shchuka-class submarine was lost sometime on or after 5 November near Tallinn, Estonia.
U-206	Kriegsmarine	The Type VIIC submarine was lost in the Bay of Biscay on or about 30 November at (approximately 47°05′N 2°40′W) with the loss of all 46 crew.

== Notes ==
1. Force K comprised HMS Aurora, HMS Lance, HMS Lively and HMS Penelope (all Royal Navy).
2. CKA are the Cyrillic letters. These translate to SKA in English.
