= HMS Lively (G40) =

Destroyer of the Royal Navy

Coordinates: 33°24′N 25°38′E

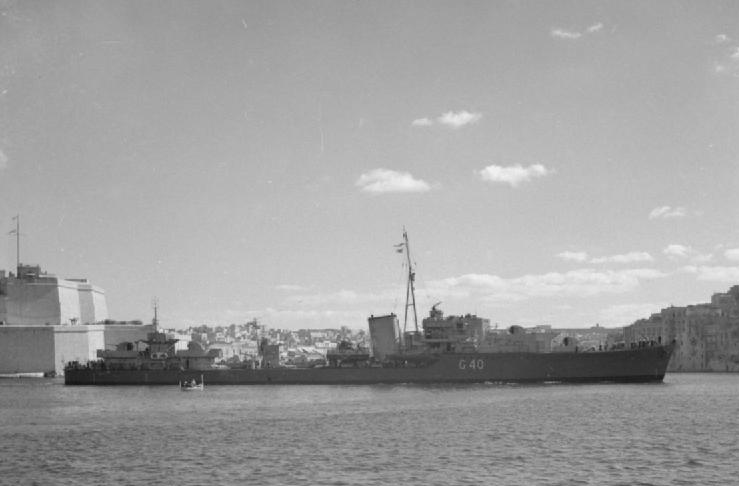

History

United Kingdom
- Name: HMS Lively
- Ordered: 31 March 1938
- Builder: Cammell Laird, Birkenhead
- Yard number: 1038
- Laid down: 20 December 1938
- Launched: 29 January 1941
- Commissioned: 20 July 1941
- Identification: Pennant number: G40
- Fate: Sunk in an air attack, 11 May 1942
- Badge: On a field barry wavy of four White and Blue On a Field Blue, an Ankh

General characteristics
- Class & type: L-class destroyer
- Displacement: 1,920 tons
- Length: 362.5 ft (110.5 m)
- Beam: 36.7 ft (11.2 m)
- Draught: 10 ft (3.0 m)
- Propulsion: Two shafts; Two geared steam turbines; Two drum type boilers; 48000 shp (35.8 MW)
- Speed: 36 kt (66.7 km/h)
- Range: 5,500 nmi at 15 kt
- Complement: 221
- Armament: 8 x QF 4-inch (101.6 mm) Mk.XVI guns, twin mount HA/LA Mk.XIX; 4 × QF 2 pdr Mk.VIII L/39 (40 mm), quad mount Mk.VII; 8 × QF 0.5 in Mk.III Vickers (12.7 mm), quad mounts Mk.III; 8 (2x4) tubes for 21 inch (533 mm) torpedoes Mk.IX

HMS Lively was an L-class destroyer of the Royal Navy. She served during the Second World War, and was sunk in the Mediterranean in an air attack on 11 May 1942.

Commissioned in 1941, she was briefly active in home waters, sailing in the North Sea, but was soon reassigned to the Mediterranean, where she was active as part of the Mediterranean Fleet, and Force K, based at Malta. Lively took part in escorting several convoys to and from the island, as well as intercepting enemy supply convoys to North Africa. She took part in the First and Second Battles of Sirte, and was damaged on a number of occasions in air and surface attacks. She was eventually sunk off Tobruk in May 1942 while trying to intercept an enemy convoy.

== Building and commissioning ==
Lively was ordered on 31 March 1938 from Cammell Laird, of Birkenhead as part of the 1937 Programme. She was laid down on 20 December 1938, launched on 29 January 1941, and commissioned on 20 July 1941. Her initial armament was altered slightly during construction in 1940, and she became one of four ships of her class to be rated as anti-aircraft destroyers.

== Wartime career ==
=== North Sea and Mediterranean ===
After working up in July 1941, Lively was assigned to Western Approaches Command in August, and was based at Greenock. One of her first duties was to deploy from Scapa Flow on 22 August with Lightning and the cruiser Curacoa to escort the damaged French submarine Rubis back to Dundee. In September she was assigned to the 4th Destroyer Flotilla based at Gibraltar, where she was one of the destroyers assigned to screen the aircraft carrier Ark Royal, and other capital ships, making deliveries of aircraft to Malta. On 24 September she sailed from Gibraltar as part of the escort for Ark Royal, and the battleships Nelson, Rodney and Prince of Wales, which were supporting Operation Halberd. The ships came under air attack which left Rodney slightly damaged, but the destroyers were able to drive off the enemy aircraft. While returning to Gibraltar on 30 September, the ships were attacked by the Italian submarine Adua. Lively supported the hunt for her, which eventually sank Adua.

=== Malta and convoys ===
Lively remained at Gibraltar until being assigned to Force K in October and despatched to escort Force H, which was delivering aircraft to Malta. She was then based out of Malta, and on 8 November she sailed with Lance and the cruisers Aurora and Penelope to intercept an enemy supply convoy in the central Mediterranean. The convoy was brought to action on 9 November, and the Battle of the Duisburg Convoy broke out between the British attackers and the Italian escorts. During the battle all seven of the merchants and one of the escorts, the destroyer Fulmine, were sunk.

Another convoy was detected near Malta by aircraft later in the month, and Force K put to sea again on 23 November to intercept it. The following day the convoy, consisting of the German supply ships Maritza and Procidas, and two escorting Italian torpedo boats, was attacked and both merchants sunk. On 1 December the Italian troop transport Adriatio was sunk by Aurora and Penelope, with some survivors being rescued by Lively. Later that day the damaged Italian tanker Irido Mantovani, which was being towed by the destroyer Alvise da Mosto, was intercepted, and both ships sunk; the Italian destroyer fought back with such gallantry that the crew of Lively saluted it with military honours as it sank.

On 5 December Lively joined the cruisers Ajax and Neptune and the destroyers Kimberley and Kingston in escorting the supply ship Breconshire from Malta to Crete, and then joining Breconshire on her return leg from Alexandria carrying supplies on 16 December. The following day they moved into the range of an Axis supply convoy being escorted by several Italian capital ships, and the First Battle of Sirte broke out. Lively took part in the confusing exchange, before being detached to escort Breconshire and several other warships into Malta. She returned to sea on 18 December with Aurora, Penelope and Neptune, and the destroyers Kandahar, Havock and Lance in an attempt to intercept an Italian supply convoy, but on 19 December the force ran into a minefield and Neptune and Kandahar were sunk and Aurora and Penelope were damaged.

Lively spent January and February escorting relief convoys to and from Malta, before sailing with a force to locate a reported damaged Italian cruiser on 9 March. The force came under air attack on 11 March, with the cruiser Naiad being sunk by a torpedo. Lively helped to rescue survivors. On 22 March Lively became involved in the Second Battle of Sirte, carrying out torpedo attacks and being damaged when a 15-inch shell exploded alongside. Detached to sail to Tobruk the following day, she suffered further damage from air attacks, but reached the port. Lively sailed from Tobruk to Alexandria in April, and then rejoined her flotilla after repairs had been completed.

== Sinking ==
On 10 May she sailed from Alexandria with Jervis, Jackal and Kipling to transport supplies to Malta. The force was ordered to return if spotted by enemy aircraft, as there was only limited allied air cover available from a Bristol Beaufort. On 11 May the British force came under heavy air attack, with Lively being dive-bombed by a squadron of German Junkers Ju 88s armed with 1,100lbs and 550lbs bombs. The first attack pass took out her bridge, leading to a hull breach and the death of her commanding officer. The dive bombers then came round for a second strafe pass. The order was soon given to abandon ship. Lively sank 100 miles (160 km) north east of Tobruk, with the loss of 77 of her crew. Jervis and Jackal were both damaged in these attacks, with Jackal having to be scuttled by Jervis after attempts to tow her failed. Jervis took on board survivors from both Lively and Jackal, and returned them to Alexandria. Despite a wartime career lasting less than a year since her commissioning, she won five battle honours: Atlantic 1941, Mediterranean 1941, Malta Convoys 1941-2, Libya 1942, and Sirte 1942.
