= German submarine U-208 =

German World War II submarine

History

Nazi Germany
- Name: U-208
- Ordered: 16 October 1939
- Yard number: 637
- Laid down: 5 August 1940
- Launched: 21 May 1941
- Commissioned: 5 July 1941
- Fate: Sunk, 7 December 1941

General characteristics
- Class & type: Type VIIC submarine
- Displacement: 769 tonnes (757 long tons) surfaced; 871 t (857 long tons) submerged
- Length: 67.10 m (220 ft 2 in) o/a; 50.50 m (165 ft 8 in) pressure hull
- Beam: 6.20 m (20 ft 4 in) o/a; 4.70 m (15 ft 5 in) pressure hull
- Height: 9.60 m (31 ft 6 in)
- Draught: 4.74 m (15 ft 7 in)
- Installed power: 2,800–3,200 PS (2,100–2,400 kW; 2,800–3,200 bhp) (diesels); 750 PS (550 kW; 740 shp) (electric)
- Propulsion: 2 shafts; 2 × diesel engines; 2 × electric motors
- Speed: 17.7 knots (32.8 km/h; 20.4 mph) surfaced; 7.6 knots (14.1 km/h; 8.7 mph) submerged
- Range: 8,500 nmi (15,700 km; 9,800 mi) at 10 knots (19 km/h; 12 mph) surfaced; 80 nmi (150 km; 92 mi) at 4 knots (7.4 km/h; 4.6 mph) submerged
- Test depth: 230 m (750 ft); Crush depth: 250–295 m (820–968 ft)
- Complement: 4 officers, 40–56 enlisted
- Armament: 5 × 53.3 cm (21 in) torpedo tubes (four bow, one stern); 14 × G7e torpedoes or 26 TMA mines; 1 × 8.8 cm (3.46 in) deck gun(220 rounds); 1 x 2 cm (0.79 in) C/30 AA gun

Service record
- Part of: 5th U-boat Flotilla; 5 July – 31 August 1941; 1st U-boat Flotilla; 1 September – 7 December 1941
- Identification codes: M 45 333
- Commanders: Oblt.z.S. Alfred Schlieper; 5 July – 7 December 1941
- Operations: 2 patrols: 1st patrol: 29 September – 12 November 1941; 2nd patrol: 3 – 7 December 1941
- Victories: 1 merchant ship sunk (3,872 GRT)

German submarine U-208 was a Type VIIC U-boat of the Kriegsmarine during World War II. The submarine was laid down on 5 August 1940 by the Friedrich Krupp Germaniawerft yard at Kiel as yard number 637, launched on 21 May 1941 and commissioned on 5 July under the command of Oberleutnant zur See Alfred Schlieper.

She was sunk on 7 December 1941 by ships of the British Royal Navy.

== Design ==
German Type VIIC submarines were preceded by the shorter Type VIIB submarines. U-208 had a displacement of 769 tonnes (757 long tons) when at the surface and 871 tonnes (857 long tons) while submerged. She had a total length of 67.10 m (220 ft 2 in), a pressure hull length of 50.50 m (165 ft 8 in), a beam of 6.20 m (20 ft 4 in), a height of 9.60 m (31 ft 6 in), and a draught of 4.74 m (15 ft 7 in). The submarine was powered by two Germaniawerft F46 four-stroke, six-cylinder supercharged diesel engines producing a total of 2,800 to 3,200 metric horsepower (2,060 to 2,350 kW; 2,760 to 3,160 shp) for use while surfaced, two AEG GU 460/8–27 double-acting electric motors producing a total of 750 metric horsepower (550 kW; 740 shp) for use while submerged. She had two shafts and two 1.23 m (4 ft) propellers. The boat was capable of operating at depths of up to 230 metres (750 ft).

The submarine had a maximum surface speed of 17.7 knots (32.8 km/h; 20.4 mph) and a maximum submerged speed of 7.6 knots (14.1 km/h; 8.7 mph). When submerged, the boat could operate for 80 nautical miles (150 km; 92 mi) at 4 knots (7.4 km/h; 4.6 mph); when surfaced, she could travel 8,500 nautical miles (15,700 km; 9,800 mi) at 10 knots (19 km/h; 12 mph). U-208 was fitted with five 53.3 cm (21 in) torpedo tubes (four fitted at the bow and one at the stern), fourteen torpedoes, one 8.8 cm (3.46 in) SK C/35 naval gun, 220 rounds, and a 2 cm (0.79 in) C/30 anti-aircraft gun. The boat had a complement of between forty-four and sixty.

== Service history ==
Part of the 1st U-boat Flotilla, U-208 carried out two patrols in the North Atlantic.

=== First patrol ===
U-208's first patrol began when she left Kiel on 29 September 1941. She travelled to the Barents Sea before turning about and headed for the gap between Iceland and the Faroe Islands. She then crossed the Atlantic Ocean to Labrador and followed the coast south to Newfoundland. She sank the Larpool about 250 nmi (460 km; 290 mi) east southeast of Cape Race (Newfoundland). Turning east, she sailed for the Bay of Biscay, arriving at Brest in occupied France, on 12 November.

=== Second patrol and loss ===
The boat's second patrol took her south of Spain. She was attacked and sunk by depth charges dropped by the British destroyers HMS Hesperus and Harvester west of Gibraltar on 7 December 1941. Forty-five men died; there were no survivors.

=== Afternote ===
U-208 was previously thought to have been sunk by the corvette HMS Bluebell on 11 December 1941, west of Gibraltar.

=== Wolfpacks ===
U-208 took part in one wolfpack, namely:

- Mordbrenner (16 October – 2 November 1941)

== Summary of raiding history ==
| Date | Ship Name | Nationality | Tonnage (GRT) | Fate |
|---|---|---|---|---|
| 2 November 1941 | Larpool | United Kingdom | 3,872 | Sunk |

== Bibliography ==
- Busch, Rainer; Röll, Hans-Joachim (1999). German U-boat commanders of World War II : a biographical dictionary. Translated by Brooks, Geoffrey. London, Annapolis, Md: Greenhill Books, Naval Institute Press. ISBN 1-55750-186-6.
- Busch, Rainer; Röll, Hans-Joachim (1999). Deutsche U-Boot-Verluste von September 1939 bis Mai 1945 [German U-boat losses from September 1939 to May 1945]. Der U-Boot-Krieg (in German). Vol. IV. Hamburg, Berlin, Bonn: Mittler. ISBN 3-8132-0514-2.
- Gröner, Erich; Jung, Dieter; Maass, Martin (1991). U-boats and Mine Warfare Vessels. German Warships 1815–1945. Vol. 2. Translated by Thomas, Keith; Magowan, Rachel. London: Conway Maritime Press. ISBN 0-85177-593-4.
