= Soviet destroyer Sovershenny =

Sovershenny (Russian: Совершенный, lit. 'Absolute'), also spelled Sovershennyy, is the name of the following ships of the Soviet Navy:

- Soviet destroyer Sovershenny (1940), a Storozhevoy-class destroyer sunk by artillery in 1942
- Soviet destroyer Sovershenny (1949), a Skory-class destroyer

== See also ==
- Russian corvette Sovershennyy, a Steregushchiy-class corvette in service since 2017
