= Hungarian ammunition ship Ungvár =

History
- Name: (Hungary) Ungvár
- Owner: Royal Hungarian Sea-Danube Navigation Co.
- Builder: Ganz & Partners Ltd.
- Launched: 1941
- Completed: 1941
- Acquired: 1941
- In service: 1941
- Out of service: 9 November 1941
- Fate: Hit a mine and sunk 9 November 1941

General characteristics
- Type: Cargo ship
- Tonnage: 1,031 GRT
- Crew: 40

Ungvár was a Hungarian Cargo ship that hit a mine laid by the Soviet destroyers Smyshlyony and Bodry in the Black Sea south of Odessa on 9 November 1941 while she was travelling from Sulina, Romania to Odessa, Ukraine with a cargo of ammunition, gasoline and food.

== Construction ==
Ungvár was launched in 1941 and completed the same year at the Ganz & Partners Ltd. shipyard in Ganz, Hungary. The ship was assessed at 1,031 GRT and had four sister ships which all belonged to the Tisza-class. Namely MS Tisza, MS Kassa, MS Kolozsvár and MS Komárom.

Ungvár was just as her sisterships leased to the Kriegsmarine of Nazi Germany in 1941 after having previously been used for commercial purposes on the Danube river. It was during her military service in World War II that she would meet her demise.

== Sinking ==
Ungvár was travelling from Sulina, Romania to Odessa, Ukraine with a cargo of 916 tons of airplane bombs, 306 tons of AA gun ammunition, 141 tons of gasoline and 469 tons of food on the morning of 9 November 1941 while being escorted by the Romanian motor torpedo boats Vijelia and Viforul. When Ungvár hit a mine laid previously by the Soviet destroyers Smyshlyony and Bodry. Her Romanian escorts neared her in order to save anyone and anything they could when her highly dangerous cargo exploded, destroying Ungvár and sinking Vijelia and Viforul. Of the 40 crewmen onboard Ungvár, 34 were lost during the disaster including 12 Hungarian crewmen, 16 German AA gunners, the commanding officer of the German Donauflottilla Korvettenkapitän Friedrich Petzel and five officers of Petzel's staff.

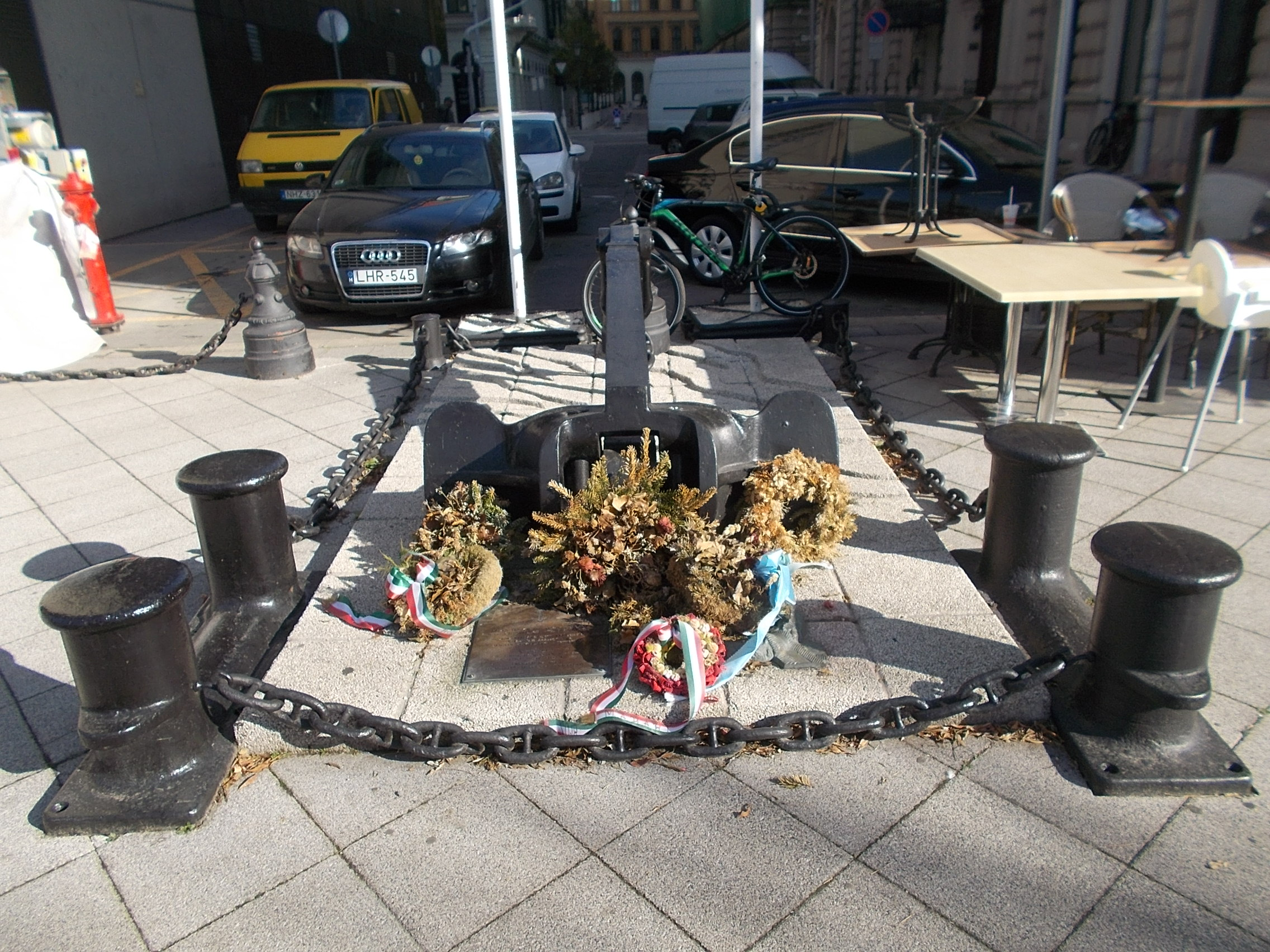
The monument for the sunken Ungvár in Budapest.

== Wreck ==
It is believed the cargo explosion completely destroyed Ungvár, leaving only a debris field and underwater crater with the wrecks of her escort ships Vijelia and Viforul laying close by.

== Legacy ==
A ten-minute Hungarian animated shortfilm was released on 21 September 2016 under the name Ungvár. The film tells the story of director Zoltán Áprily's grandfather who worked as a waiter on the real Ungvár when she sank, being one of the six survivors. The movie can be watched for free online.

A sailor monument was also erected in Budapest in 1993 with an anchor replica of Ungvár to commemorate the lives lost in the disaster.
