= Italian destroyer Libeccio =

Destroyer of the Regia Marina

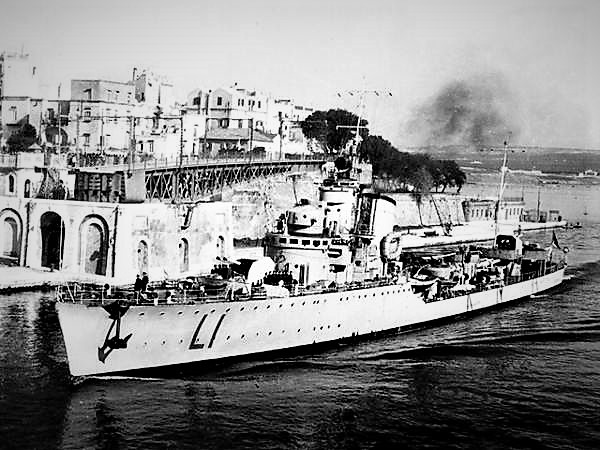
- Libeccio in Taranto

History

Kingdom of Italy
- Name: Libeccio
- Namesake: Libeccio
- Builder: Cantiere navale di Riva Trigoso
- Laid down: 29 September 1931
- Launched: 4 July 1934
- Completed: 23 November 1934
- Fate: Sunk by torpedo, 9 November 1941

General characteristics (as built)
- Class & type: Maestrale-class destroyer
- Displacement: 1,640 t (1,610 long tons) (standard); 2,243 t (2,208 long tons) (full load)
- Length: 106.7 m (350 ft 1 in)
- Beam: 10.15 m (33 ft 4 in)
- Draught: 3.31–4.3 m (10 ft 10 in – 14 ft 1 in)
- Installed power: 3 three-drum boilers; 44,000 hp (33,000 kW)
- Propulsion: 2 shafts; 2 geared steam turbines
- Speed: 32–33 knots (59–61 km/h; 37–38 mph)
- Range: 2,600–2,800 nmi (4,800–5,200 km; 3,000–3,200 mi) at 18 knots (33 km/h; 21 mph)
- Complement: 190
- Armament: 2 × twin 120 mm (4.7 in) guns; 2 × single 120 mm (4.7 in) star shell guns; 2 × single 40 mm (1.6 in) AA guns; 2 × twin 13.2 mm (0.52 in) machine guns; 2 × triple 533 mm (21 in) torpedo tubes; 2–4 × depth charge throwers; 56 mines

Libeccio was one of four Maestrale-class destroyer built for the Regia Marina (Royal Italian Navy) in the early 1930s. Completed in 1934, she served in World War II.

She was present during the Battle of Taranto, and suffered a direct bomb hit, however it passed through her hull without exploding. She was also present at the disastrous Battle of the Duisburg Convoy, though survived only to be torpedoed the next day by HMS Upholder when she returned to the scene to search for survivors, she was taken in tow but soon sank.

== Design and description ==
The Maestrale-class destroyers were a completely new design intended to rectify the stability problems of the preceding Folgore class. They had a length between perpendiculars of 101.6 meters (333 ft 4 in) and an overall length of 106.7 meters (350 ft 1 in). The ships had a beam of 10.15 meters (33 ft 4 in) and a mean draft of 3.31 meters (10 ft 10 in) and 4.3 meters (14 ft 1 in) at deep load. They displaced 1,640 metric tons (1,610 long tons) at standard load, and 2,243 metric tons (2,208 long tons) at deep load. Their complement during wartime was 190 officers and enlisted men.

The Maestrales were powered by two Parsons geared steam turbines, each driving one propeller shaft using steam supplied by a trio of three-drum boilers. The turbines were designed to produce 44,000 shaft horsepower (33,000 kW) and a speed of 32–33 knots (59–61 km/h; 37–38 mph) in service, but Libeccio briefly reached a speed of 41.3 knots (76.5 km/h; 47.5 mph) during her sea trials while lightly loaded. The ships carried enough fuel oil to give them a range of 2,600–2,800 nautical miles (4,800–5,200 km; 3,000–3,200 mi) at a speed of 18 knots (33 km/h; 21 mph) and 690 nmi (1,280 km; 790 mi) at a speed of 33 knots (61 km/h; 38 mph).

Their main battery consisted of four 120-millimeter (4.7 in) guns in two twin-gun turrets, one each fore and aft of the superstructure. Amidships were a pair of 15-caliber 120-millimeter star shell guns. Anti-aircraft (AA) defense for the Maestrale-class ships was provided by four 13.2-millimeter (0.52 in) machine guns. They were equipped with six 533-millimeter (21 in) torpedo tubes in two triple mounts amidships. Although the ships were not provided with a sonar system for anti-submarine work, they were fitted with a pair of depth charge throwers. The Maestrales could carry 56 mines.

== Bibliography ==
- Brescia, Maurizio (2012). Mussolini's Navy: A Reference Guide to the Regina Marina 1930–45. Annapolis, Maryland: Naval Institute Press. ISBN 978-1-59114-544-8.
- Fraccaroli, Aldo (1968). Italian Warships of World War II. Shepperton, UK: Ian Allan. ISBN 0-7110-0002-6.
- Roberts, John (1980). "Italy". In Chesneau, Roger (ed.). Conway's All the World's Fighting Ships 1922–1946. New York: Mayflower Books. pp. 280–317. ISBN 0-8317-0303-2.
- Rohwer, Jürgen (2005). Chronology of the War at Sea 1939–1945: The Naval History of World War Two (Third Revised ed.). Annapolis, Maryland: Naval Institute Press. ISBN 1-59114-119-2.
- Thomas P. Lowry, John Wellham (1995). Attack on Taranto. Pennsylvania: Stackpole Books. ISBN 0-8117-2661-4
- Whitley, M. J. (1988). Destroyers of World War 2: An International Encyclopedia. Annapolis, Maryland: Naval Institute Press. ISBN 1-85409-521-8.
