= Italian destroyer Fulmine (1931) =

Destroyer of the Regia Marina

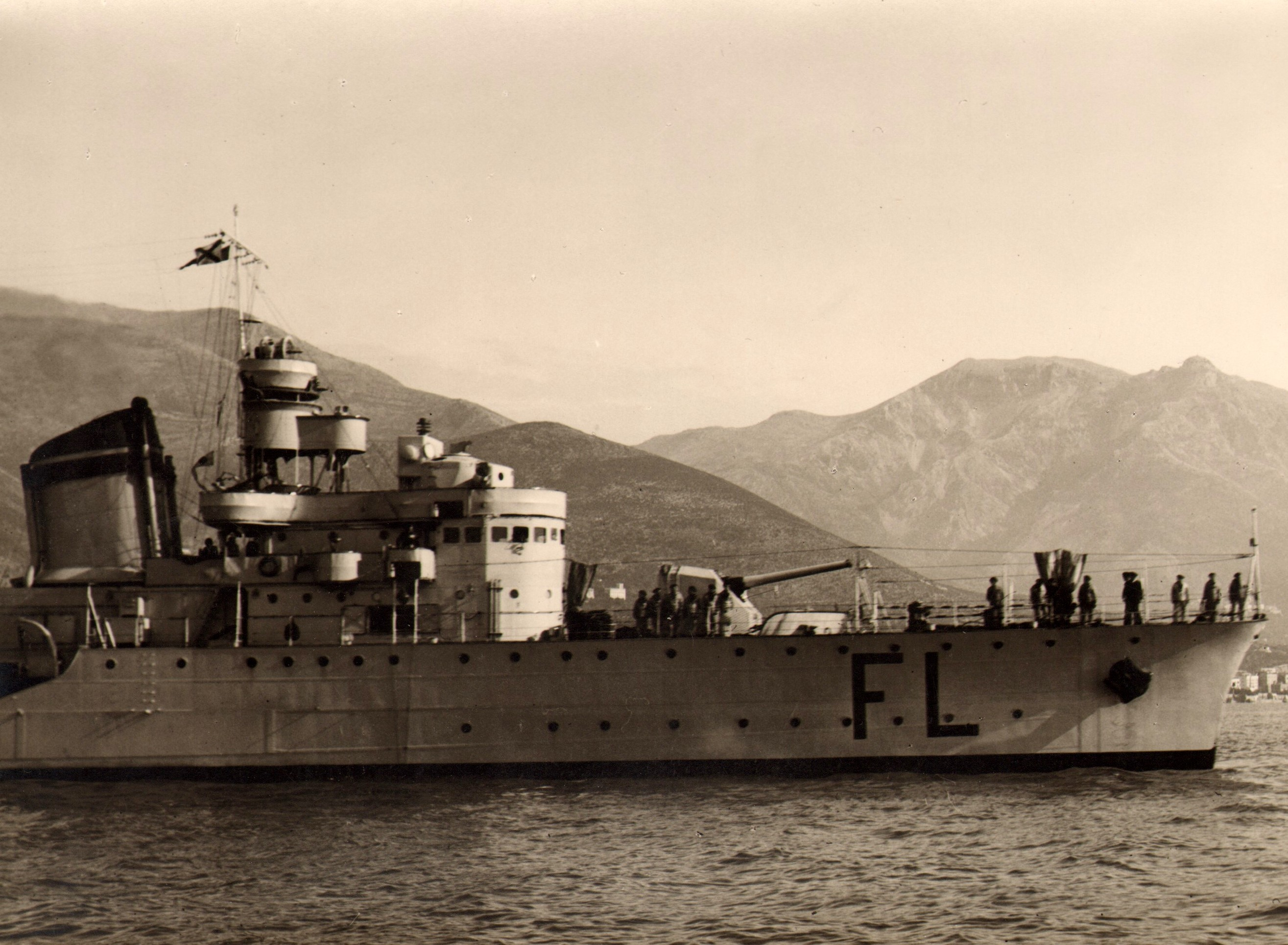
- Fulmine 1931

History

Kingdom of Italy
- Name: Fulmine
- Namesake: Lightning
- Builder: Cantieri navali del Quarnaro, Fiume
- Laid down: 1 April 1930
- Launched: 2 August 1931
- Completed: 4 September 1932
- Fate: Sunk by gunfire, 9 November 1941

General characteristics (as built)
- Class & type: Folgore-class destroyer
- Displacement: 1,238 t (1,218 long tons) (standard); 2,090 t (2,060 long tons) (full load)
- Length: 96.05 m (315 ft 1 in) (o/a)
- Beam: 9.2 m (30 ft 2 in)
- Draught: 3.3–4.3 m (10 ft 10 in – 14 ft 1 in)
- Installed power: 3 Thornycroft boilers; 44,000 hp (33,000 kW)
- Propulsion: 2 shafts; 2 geared steam turbines
- Speed: 30 knots (56 km/h; 35 mph)
- Range: 3,600 nmi (6,700 km; 4,100 mi) at 12 knots (22 km/h; 14 mph)
- Complement: 185
- Armament: 2 × twin 120 mm (4.7 in) guns; 2 × single 40 mm (1.6 in) AA guns; 2 × twin 13.2 mm (0.52 in) machine guns; 2 × triple 533 mm (21 in) torpedo tubes; 2 × depth charge throwers; 52 mines

Fulmine was one of four Folgore-class destroyers built for the Regia Marina (Royal Italian Navy) in the early 1930s. Completed in 1932, she served in World War II.

== Design and description ==
The Folgore-class destroyers were essentially copies of the preceding Freccia class, although their beam was reduced in an unsuccessful attempt to improve their speed over that achieved by the earlier ships. The Folgores had an overall length of 96.05 meters (315 ft 1 in), a beam of 9.2 meters (30 ft 2 in) and a mean draft of 3.3 meters (10 ft 10 in) and 4.3 meters (14 ft 1 in) at deep load. They displaced 1,238 metric tons (1,218 long tons) at standard load, and 2,090 metric tons (2,060 long tons) at deep load. Their complement during wartime was 185 officers and enlisted men.

The Folgores were powered by two Belluzzo geared steam turbines, each driving one propeller shaft using steam supplied by three Thornycroft boilers. The turbines were designed to produce 44,000 shaft horsepower (33,000 kW) and a speed of 30 knots (56 km/h; 35 mph) in service, although the ships reached speeds of 38–39 knots (70–72 km/h; 44–45 mph) during their sea trials while lightly loaded. They carried enough fuel oil to give them a range of 3,600 nautical miles (6,700 km; 4,100 mi) at a speed of 12 knots (22 km/h; 14 mph).

Their main battery consisted of four 120-millimeter (4.7 in) guns in two twin-gun turrets, one each fore and aft of the superstructure. Anti-aircraft (AA) defense for the Folgore-class ships was provided by a pair of 40-millimeter (1.6 in) AA guns in single mounts amidships and a pair of twin-gun mounts for 13.2-millimeter (0.52 in) machine guns. They were equipped with six 533-millimeter (21 in) torpedo tubes in two triple mounts amidships. Although the ships were not provided with a sonar system for anti-submarine work, they were fitted with a pair of depth charge throwers. The Folgores could carry 52 mines.

== Construction and career ==
Fulmine was laid down by Cantieri navali del Quarnaro at their Fiume shipyard on 1 October 1929, launched on 2 August 1931 and commissioned on 14 September 1932.

== Bibliography ==
- Brescia, Maurizio (2012). Mussolini's Navy: A Reference Guide to the Regina Marina 1930–45. Annapolis, Maryland: Naval Institute Press. ISBN 978-1-59114-544-8.
- Fraccaroli, Aldo (1968). Italian Warships of World War II. Shepperton, UK: Ian Allan. ISBN 0-7110-0002-6.
- Roberts, John (1980). "Italy". In Chesneau, Roger (ed.). Conway's All the World's Fighting Ships 1922–1946. New York: Mayflower Books. pp. 280–317. ISBN 0-8317-0303-2.
- Rohwer, Jürgen (2005). Chronology of the War at Sea 1939–1945: The Naval History of World War Two (Third Revised ed.). Annapolis, Maryland: Naval Institute Press. ISBN 1-59114-119-2.
- Whitley, M. J. (1988). Destroyers of World War 2: An International Encyclopedia. Annapolis, Maryland: Naval Institute Press. ISBN 1-85409-521-8.
