= Maestrale-class destroyer =

Ship class

- Scirocco at anchor

Class overview
- Name: Maestrale class
- Operators: Regia Marina; Italian Navy
- Preceded by: Folgore class
- Succeeded by: Oriani class
- Built: 1931–1934
- In commission: 1934–1965
- Completed: 4
- Lost: 3
- Scrapped: 1

General characteristics (as built)
- Type: Destroyer
- Displacement: 1,610 long tons (1,640 t) (standard); 2,208 long tons (2,243 t) (full load)
- Length: 106.7 m (350 ft 1 in)
- Beam: 10.15 m (33 ft 4 in)
- Draught: 3.31–4.3 m (10 ft 10 in – 14 ft 1 in)
- Installed power: 3 three-drum boilers; 44,000 hp (33,000 kW)
- Propulsion: 2 shafts; 2 geared steam turbines
- Speed: 32–33 knots (59–61 km/h; 37–38 mph)
- Range: 2,600–2,800 nmi (4,800–5,200 km; 3,000–3,200 mi) at 18 knots (33 km/h; 21 mph)
- Complement: 7 officers and 166 men
- Armament: 2 × twin 120 mm (4.7 in) guns; 2 × single 120 mm (4.7 in) star shell guns; 2 × single 40 mm (1.6 in) AA guns; 2 × twin 13.2 mm (0.52 in) machine guns; 2 × triple 533 mm (21 in) torpedo tubes; 2–4 × depth charge throwers; 56 mines

The Maestrale class were a group of destroyers built for the Regia Marina (Royal Italian Navy) and served in World War II. They formed the basis for subsequent Italian destroyer designs; the Oriani and Soldati classes.

== Design and description ==
The Maestrale-class destroyers were a completely new design intended to rectify the stability problems of the preceding Folgore class. They had a length between perpendiculars of 101.6 meters (333 ft 4 in) and an overall length of 106.7 meters (350 ft 1 in). The ships had a beam of 10.15 meters (33 ft 4 in) and a mean draft of 3.31 meters (10 ft 10 in) and 4.3 meters (14 ft 1 in) at deep load. They displaced 1,640 metric tons (1,610 long tons) at normal load, and 2,243 metric tons (2,208 long tons) at deep load. Their complement during wartime was 190 officers and enlisted men.

The Maestrales were powered by two Parsons geared steam turbines, each driving one propeller shaft using steam supplied by a trio of three-drum boilers. The turbines were designed to produce 44,000 shaft horsepower (33,000 kW) and a speed of 32–33 knots (59–61 km/h; 37–38 mph) in service, although they reached speeds of 38–39 knots (70–72 km/h; 44–45 mph) during their sea trials while lightly loaded. The ships carried enough fuel oil to give them a range of 2,600–2,800 nautical miles (4,800–5,200 km; 3,000–3,200 mi) at a speed of 18 knots (33 km/h; 21 mph) and 690 nmi (1,280 km; 790 mi) at a speed of 33 knots (61 km/h; 38 mph).

Their main battery consisted of four 50-caliber 120-millimeter (4.7 in) guns in two twin-gun turrets, one each fore and aft of the superstructure. Amidships were a pair of 15-caliber 120-millimeter star shell guns. Anti-aircraft (AA) defense for the Maestrale-class ships was provided by four 13.2-millimeter (0.52 in) machine guns. They were equipped with six 533-millimeter (21 in) torpedo tubes in two triple mounts amidships. Although the ships were not provided with a sonar system for anti-submarine work, they were fitted with a pair of depth charge throwers. The Maestrales could carry 56 mines.

== Ships ==
- Maestrale (North-West wind)

Built by CT Riva Trigoso,
completed 2 September 1934.
Damaged by a mine on 9 January 1943, she was scuttled on 9 September 1943 during the Italian Armistice while being repaired in Genoa.

- Grecale (North-East wind)

Built by CNR Ancona,
completed 15 November 1934.
She survived the war and served in the Marina Militare until 1964.

- Libeccio (South-West wind)

Built by CNR Ancona,
Laid down 29 Sep 1931
Launched 4 July 1934
completed 23 November 1934.
She was sunk on 9 November 1941 by the British submarine Upholder.

- Scirocco (South-East wind)

Built by CT Riva Trigoso,
Completed 21 October 1934.
Sunk in a storm following the Second Battle of Sirte on 23 March 1942, with only two survivors among the 236-strong crew.

== Bibliography ==
- Brescia, Maurizio (2012). Mussolini's Navy: A Reference Guide to the Regina Marina 1930–45. Annapolis, Maryland: Naval Institute Press. ISBN 978-1-59114-544-8.
- Campbell, John (1985). Naval Weapons of World War Two. Annapolis, Maryland: Naval Institute Press. ISBN 0-87021-459-4.
- Fraccaroli, Aldo (1968). Italian Warships of World War II. Shepperton, UK: Ian Allan. ISBN 0-7110-0002-6.
- Roberts, John (1980). "Italy". In Chesneau, Roger (ed.). Conway's All the World's Fighting Ships 1922–1946. New York: Mayflower Books. pp. 280–317. ISBN 0-8317-0303-2.
- Rohwer, Jürgen (2005). Chronology of the War at Sea 1939–1945: The Naval History of World War Two (Third Revised ed.). Annapolis, Maryland: Naval Institute Press. ISBN 1-59114-119-2.
- Smigielski, Adam (1995). "Italy". In Chumbley, Stephen (ed.). Conway's All the World's Fighting Ships 1947-1995. Annapolis, Maryland: Naval Institute Press. pp. 195–218. ISBN 1-55750-132-7.
- Whitley, M. J. (1988). Destroyers of World War 2: An International Encyclopedia. Annapolis, Maryland: Naval Institute Press. ISBN 1-85409-521-8.
