= Cantiere navale di Ancona =

Italian shipyard

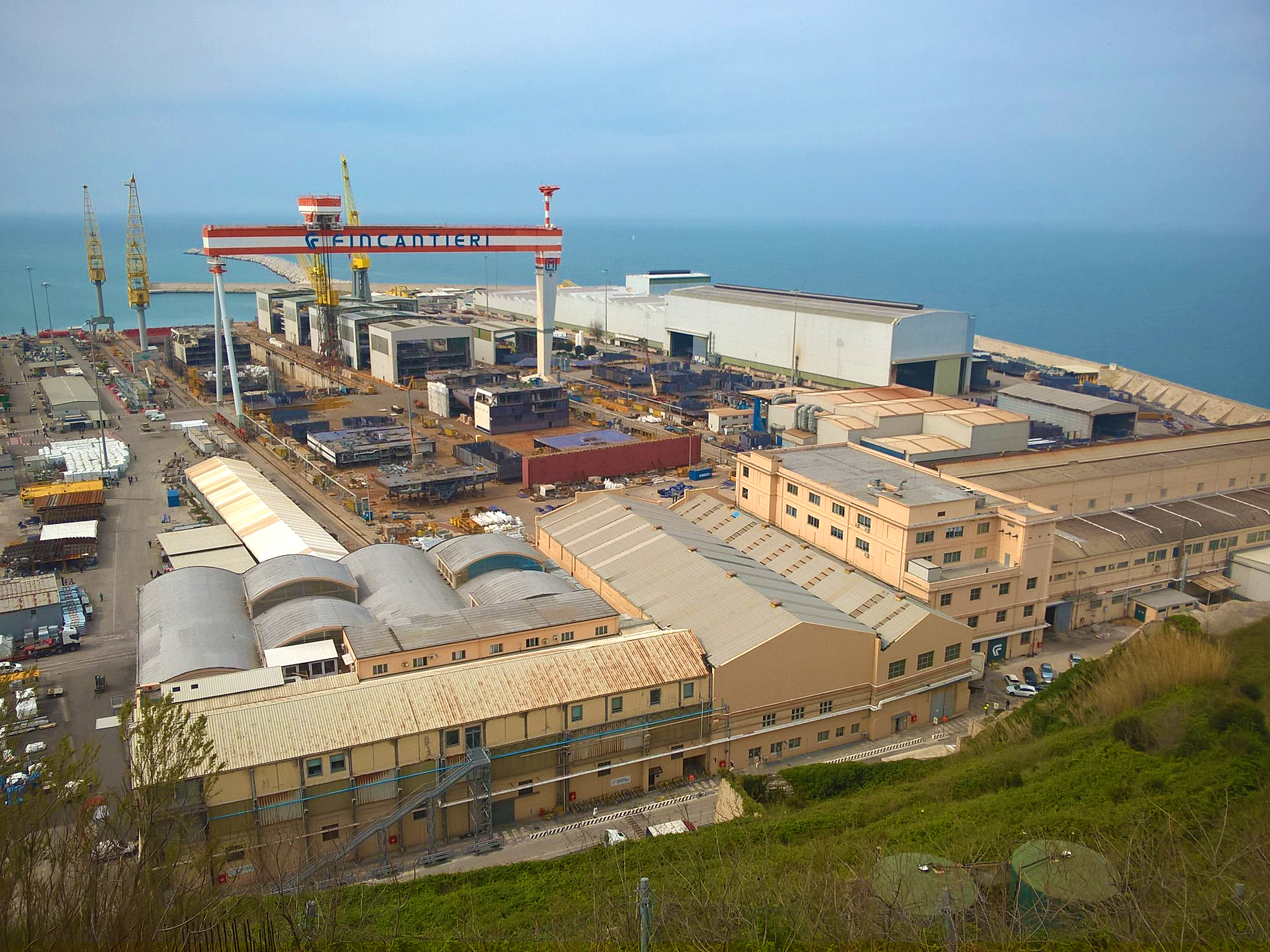
- Industry: Shipbuilding
- Founded: 1843
- Headquarters: Ancona, Italy
- Parent: Fincantieri

Cantiere navale di Ancona (Ancona Shipyard) is an Italian shipyard.

== History ==
Active in Roman and medieval times, it was refounded in 1843 when Ancona was under the control of the Papal States. Acquired by Rodolfo Hofer in 1899, it was combined with his Cantiere navale del Muggiano into the Officine e Cantieri Liguri-Anconetani and then, together with the Cantiere navale di Palermo, amalgamated into Cantieri Navali Riuniti (CNR) on 31 January 1906. It was acquired by Fincantieri in 1973.

== Bibliography ==
- Brescia, Maurizio (2012). Mussolini's Navy: A Reference Guide to the Regina Marina 1930–45. Annapolis, Maryland: Naval Institute Press. ISBN 978-1-59114-544-8.
