= List of destroyers of Italy =

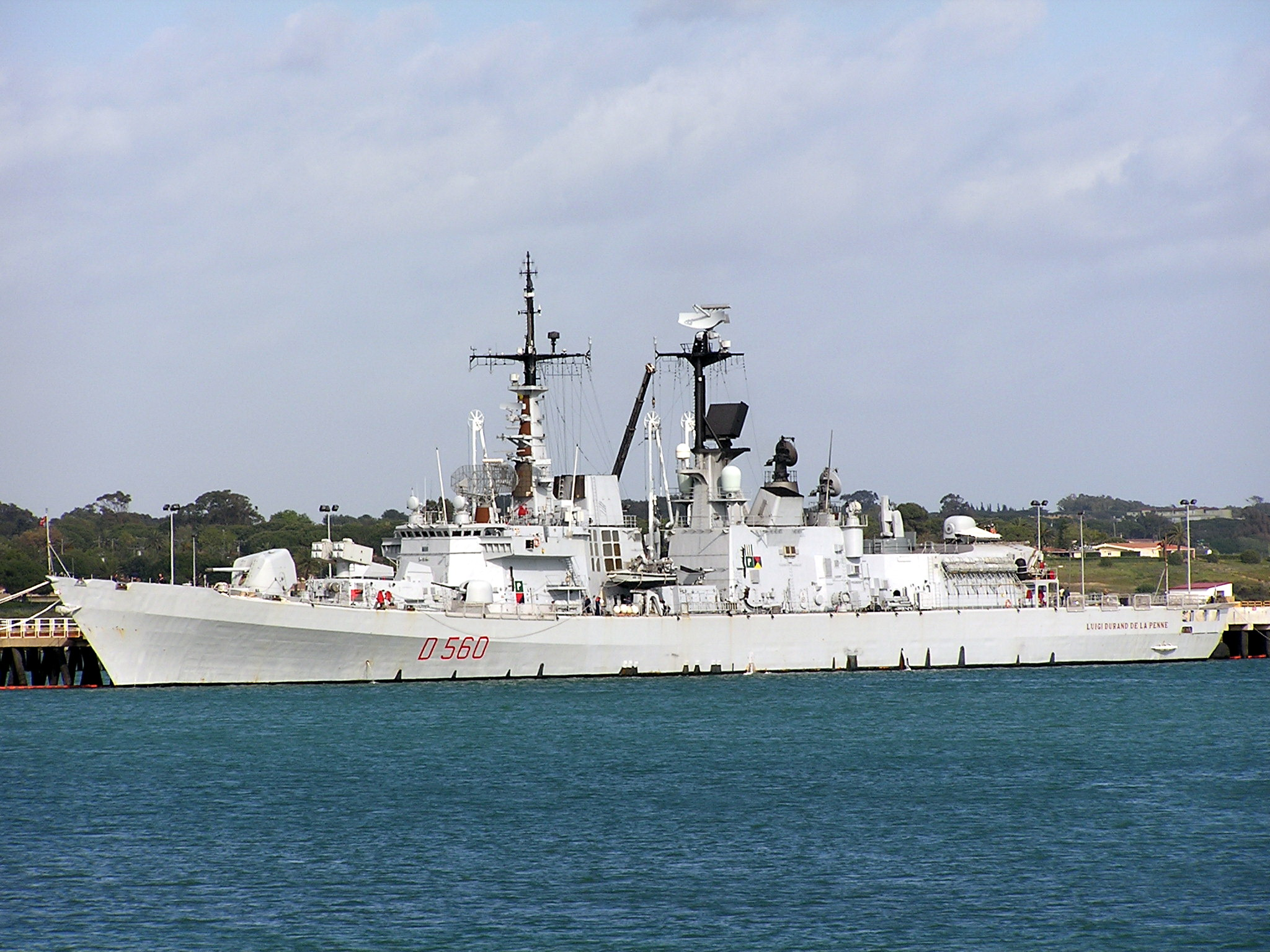
Italian destroyer Durand de la Penne in 2004

This is a list of destroyers of the Regia Marina and Marina Militare, sorted by era and class.

== Regia Marina ==
=== World War I ===
- Fulmine
- Lampo class
  - Lampo
  - Freccia
  - Dardo
  - Strale
  - Euro
  - Ostro
- Nembo class
  - Nembo
  - Turbine
  - Aquilone
  - Borea
  - Zeffiro
  - Espero - renamed Turbine in 1921
- Soldato class
  - Artigliere
  - Bersagliere
  - Corazziere
  - Garibaldino
  - Granatiere
  - Lanciere
  - Alpino
  - Carabiniere
  - Fuciliere
  - Pontiere
  - Ascaro
- Indomito class
  - Impetuoso
  - Impavido
  - Insidioso
  - Irrequieto
  - Indomito
  - Intrepido
- Ardito class
  - Ardito
  - Ardente
- Audace class
  - Audace
  - Animoso
- Rosolino Pilo class - reclassified as torpedo boats on 1 October 1929
  - Rosolino Pilo
  - Giuseppe Cesare Abba
  - Pilade Bronzetti - renamed Giuseppe Dezza in 1921
  - Giuseppe Missori
  - Antonio Mosto
  - Ippolito Nievo
  - Francesco Nullo - renamed Fratelli Cairoli in 1921
  - Simone Schiaffino
- Alessandro Poerio class - built as scout cruisers (esploratori), reclassified as destroyers on 1 July 1921
  - Alessandro Poerio - to Nationalist Spain in October 1937 as Huesca
  - Cesare Rossarol
  - Guglielmo Pepe - to Nationalist Spain in October 1937 as Teruel
- Aquila class - ordered as large destroyers by Romania, but taken over by Italy on 5 June 1915 while building and reclassified as scout cruisers (esploratori); two sold 1920 and remaining two reclassified as destroyers on 5 September 1938
  - Aquila - to Nationalist Spain on 11 October 1937 as Melilla
  - Falco - to Nationalist Spain on 11 October 1937 as Ceuta
  - Nibbio - to Romania on 1 July 1920 as NMS Mărășești
  - Sparviero - to Romania on 1 July 1920 as NMS Mărăști
- Mirabello class - built as scout cruisers (esploratori), reclassified as destroyers on 1 October 1938
  - Carlo Mirabello
  - Carlo Alberto Racchia
  - Augusto Riboty
- Urakaze class - ordered by Japan
  - Audace - ordered as Kawakaze; sold to Italy in 1916; reclassified as torpedo boat on 1 October 1929
- La Masa class - reclassified as torpedo boats on 1 October 1929
  - Giuseppe La Masa
  - Angelo Bassini
  - Agostino Bertani- renamed Enrico Cosenz in 1921
  - Benedetto Cairoli
  - Giacinto Carini
  - Nicola Fabrizi
  - Giuseppe La Farina
  - Giacomo Medici
- Giuseppe Sirtori class - reclassified as torpedo boats on 1 October 1929
  - Giuseppe Sirtori
  - Giovanni Acerbi
  - Vincenzo Giordano Orsini
  - Francesco Stocco

=== World War II ===
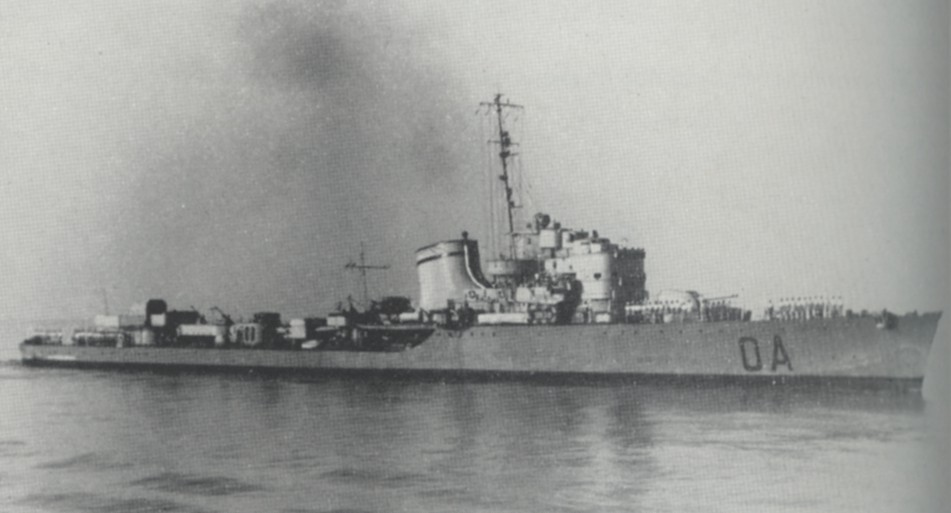
Cacciatorpediniere Oriani in 1940

- Palestro class - reclassified as torpedo boats on 1 October 1938
  - Palestro
  - Confienza
  - San Martino
  - Solferino
- Generali class - reclassified as torpedo boats on 1 October 1929
  - Generale Antonio Cantore
  - Generale Antonio Cascino
  - Generale Antonio Chinotto
  - Generale Carlo Montanari
  - Generale Marcello Prestinari
  - Generale Achille Papa
- Curtatone class - reclassified as torpedo boats on 1 October 1938
  - Calatafimi
  - Castelfidardo
  - Curtatone
  - Monzambano
- Leone class
  - Leone
  - Tigre
  - Pantera
- Sella class
  - Francesco Crispi
  - Quintino Sella
  - Bettino Ricasoli
  - Giovanni Nicotera
- Sauro class
  - Nazario Sauro
  - Daniele Manin
  - Cesare Battisti
  - Francesco Nullo
- Turbine/Borea class
  - Turbine
  - Nembo
  - Borea
  - Aquilone
  - Euro
  - Espero
  - Zeffiro
  - Ostro
- Navigatori class
  - Alvise Da Mosto
  - Antonio da Noli
  - Nicoloso da Recco
  - Giovanni da Verrazzano
  - Lanzerotto Malocello
  - Leone Pancaldo
  - Emanuele Pessagno
  - Antonio Pigafetta
  - Luca Tarigo
  - Antoniotto Usodimare
  - Ugolino Vivaldi
  - Nicolò Zeno
- Freccia/Dardo class
  - Dardo
  - Freccia
  - Saetta
  - Strale
- Folgore class
  - Baleno
  - Folgore
  - Lampo
  - Fulmine
- Maestrale class
  - Maestrale
  - Scirocco
  - Grecale
  - Libeccio
- Oriani or Poeti class
  - Vittorio Alfieri
  - Giosuè Carducci
  - Alfredo Oriani
  - Vincenzo Gioberti
- Soldati class
  - Alpino
  - Artigliere
  - Ascari
  - Aviere
  - Bersagliere
  - Camicia Nera
  - Carabiniere
  - Corazziere
  - Fuciliere
  - Geniere
  - Granatiere
  - Lanciere
  - Bombardiere
  - Carrista
  - Corsaro
  - Legionario
  - Mitragliere
  - Squadrista
  - Velite

==== Cancelled ships ====
- Comandanti Medaglie d'Oro class - 20 vessels planned, none completed
  - Comandante Margottini
  - Comandante Baroni
  - Comandante Borsini
  - Comandante Botti
  - Comandante Casana
  - Comandante De Cristofaro
  - Comandante Dell'Anno
  - Comandante Fontanta
  - Comandante Ruta
  - Comandante Toscano
  - Comandante Giobbe
  - Comandante Giorgis
  - Comandante Moccagatta
  - Comandante Rodocanacchi
  - Comandante Corsi
  - Comandante Esposito
  - Comandante Fiorelli
  - Comandante Giannatassio
  - Comandante Milano
  - Comandante Novaro

==== Captured ships ====
- Premuda - former Yugoslav destroyer Dubrovnik, captured in April 1941
- Beograd class
  - Sebenico - former Yugoslav destroyer Beograd, captured in April 1941
  - Lubiana - former Yugoslav destroyer Ljubljana, captured in April 1941
- Chacal class
  - FR 22 - former French destroyer Panthére, captured in November 1942
- Guépard class
  - FR 21 - former French destroyer Lion, captured in November 1942
  - FR 24 - former French destroyer Valmy, captured in November 1942
- Bourrasque class
  - FR 31 - former French destroyer Trombe, captured in November 1942

== Marina Militare ==
=== Post-World War II ===
- Artigliere - ex Benson-class USS Woodworth
- Aviere - ex Gleaves-class USS Nicholson
- Impetuoso class
  - Impetuoso
  - Indomito
- Impavido class
  - Impavido
  - Intrepido
- Fante class - former Fletcher-class destroyers of the US Navy
  - Fante - ex USS Walker
  - Geniere - ex USS Prichett
  - Lanciere - ex USS Taylor
- Audace class
  - Audace
  - Ardito
- Durand de la Penne class
  - Luigi Durand de la Penne; formerly Animoso
  - Francesco Mimbelli; formerly Ardimentoso
- Orizzonte class
  - Andrea Doria
  - Caio Duilio

== See also ==
- Red Sea Flotilla
- Italian World War II destroyers
