= First Battle of Sirte =

Naval battle in the Second World War

Coordinates: 34°8′4″N 17°57′5″E

- Part of the Battle of the Mediterranean of the Second World War
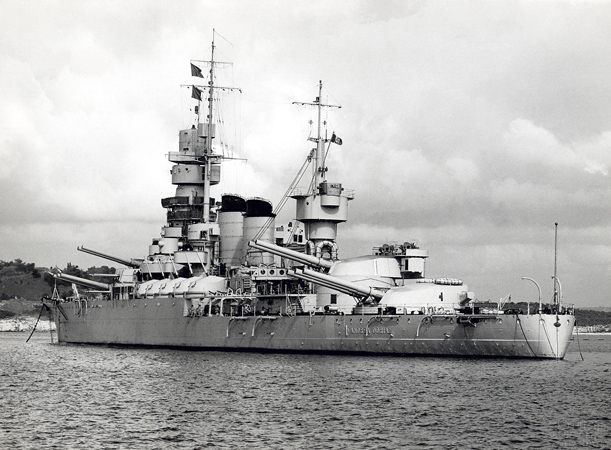
- Italian battleship Andrea Doria, 31 December 1939
Date	17 December 1941
Location	Gulf of Sidra, Mediterranean Sea
Result	Inconclusive

Belligerents
United Kingdom; Australia; Netherlands	Italy

Commanders and leaders
Andrew Cunningham; Philip Vian	Angelo Iachino; Guido Porzio Giovanola

Strength
5 light cruisers; 14 destroyers	4 battleships; 2 heavy cruisers; 3 light cruisers; 13 destroyers

Casualties and losses
1 killed; 2 destroyers damaged	Nil

The First Battle of Sirte was fought between forces of the British Mediterranean Fleet and the Regia Marina (Italian Royal Navy) during the Battle of the Mediterranean in the Second World War. The engagement took place on 17 December 1941, south-east of Malta, in the Gulf of Sirte. The engagement was inconclusive as both forces were protecting convoys and wished to avoid battle.

In the following days, two Royal Navy forces based at Malta ran into Italian minefield T off Tripoli and two British battleships were disabled by Italian human torpedo during the Raid on Alexandria. By the end of December, the balance of naval power in the Mediterranean had shifted in favour of the Regia Marina.

== Background ==
The British Eighth Army and the Axis armies in North Africa were engaged in battles resulting from Operation Crusader, which had been fought between 18 November and 4 December. Its aim was to defeat the Afrika Korps and relieve the siege of Tobruk. This had been achieved and Axis forces were conducting a fighting retreat; by 13 December, they were holding a defensive line at Gazala, east of Benghazi. The Axis were desperate to supply their forces, intending to transport stores to Tripoli, their main port in Libya and Benghazi, the port closest to the front line. The island garrison of Malta was under siege and the British wanted to supply their forces on the island.

== Prelude ==
=== Convoy M41/M42 ===
The Italians were preparing to send Convoy M41, of eight ships, to Africa on 13 December 1941. That morning, their previous supply attempt, two fast cruisers carrying fuel to Tripoli, had failed when they were sunk at the Battle of Cape Bon by a force of destroyers en route to Alexandria. The eight merchant ships were in three groups, with a close escort of five destroyers and a distant cover force of the battleships Littorio and Vittorio Veneto, four destroyers and two torpedo boats. Soon after sailing on 13 December, a group of Convoy M41 was attacked by the British submarine HMS Upright and two ships were sunk; later that day two ships collided and had to return to base, while the distant cover force was sighted by the submarine HMS Urge and Vittorio Veneto was torpedoed and forced to return to port.

Supermarina, the high command of the Italian navy, rattled by these losses and a report that a British force of two battleships was at sea, ordered the ships to return to await reinforcement but the "force of two battleships" was a decoy operation by the minelayer HMS Abdiel. On 16 December, the four-ship Italian convoy, renamed Convoy M42, left Taranto, picking up escorts along the way. The close escort was provided by seven destroyers and a torpedo boat; by the time they reached Sicily they were also accompanied by a close cover force, comprising the battleship Duilio, three light cruisers and three destroyers. The distant covering force consisted of the battleships Littorio, Andrea Doria and Giulio Cesare, two cruisers and 10 destroyers.

=== Allied convoy ===
The British planned to run supplies to Malta using the fast merchant ship Breconshire, covered by a force of cruisers and destroyers, while the destroyers from the Cape Bon engagement would proceed to Alexandria from Malta covered by Force K and Force B from Malta on 15 December. The British force was depleted when the light cruiser HMS Galatea was torpedoed and sunk by U-557, just before midnight on 14 December. U-557 was accidentally sunk less than 48 hours later, by the Italian torpedo boat Orione. On 15 December, Breconshire sailed from Alexandria escorted by three cruisers and eight destroyers under Rear-Admiral Philip Vian in HMS Naiad. On 16 December, the four destroyers of 4th Flotilla (Commander G. Stokes in HMS Sikh) left Malta, covered by Force K (Captain William 'Bill' Agnew in HMS Aurora), two cruisers and two destroyers. Thirty Italian warships were escorting four cargo ships. The two British groups were also at sea and steaming toward each other; the opposing forces were likely to cross each other's tracks east of Malta on 18 December.

== Battle ==
On 17 December, an Italian reconnaissance aircraft spotted the British westbound formation near Sidi Barrani, apparently proceeding from Alexandria to intercept the Italian convoy. The British convoy was shadowed by Axis aeroplanes and attacked during the afternoon but no hits were scored and Agnew and Stokes met the westbound convoy. By late afternoon the Italian fleet was close by and spotter planes from the battleships had made contact with the British convoy, but the planes misidentified Breconshire as a battleship. At 17:42, the fleets sighted each other; Admiral Angelo Iachino—commander of the Italian forces—moved to intercept to defend his convoy.

Vian also wished to avoid combat, so with the British giving ground and the Italians pursuing with caution, the British were easily able to avoid an engagement. Just after sunset, an air attack on the British ships caused them to return fire with their anti-aircraft guns, allowing the Italian naval force to spot them. Iachino took in the distant covering force and opened fire at a range of 35000 yards (32000m), well out of range of the British guns. Vian immediately laid smoke and moved to the attack while Breconshire moved away, escorted by the destroyers HMS Decoy and HMS Havock.

Lacking radar and mindful of their defeat in the night action at the Battle of Cape Matapan, the Italians wished to avoid a night engagement. The Italians fired for only 15 minutes before disengaging and returning westwards to cover convoy M42. HMS Kipling suffered the loss of one midshipman and some damage due to a near-miss either from an 8 in (200 mm) shell, possibly fired by the Italian cruiser Gorizia or as stated by British official reports by 13 in (320 mm) shell splinters from Andrea Doria and Giulio Cesare, that knocked down wireless aerials and holed the hull, superstructure and ship's boats. British reports tell of other warships punctured by splinters.

== Aftermath ==
=== Minefield T ===
After dark, Vian turned to return with Stokes to Alexandria, leaving Agnew to bring Breconshire to Malta, joined by Force B, one cruiser (the other was under repair) and two destroyers. Breconshire and her escorts arrived in Malta at 15:00 on 18 December. At midday, the Italian force also split up and three ships headed for Tripoli, accompanied by the close cover force, while the German supply ship Ankara, headed for Benghazi. The distant cover force remained on station in the Gulf of Sidra until evening, before heading back to base. The British had now realised that the Italians had a convoy in the area; Vian searched for it without success as he returned to Alexandria.

In the afternoon, the position of the Tripoli group was established; a cruiser and two destroyers of Force B and two cruisers and two destroyers of Force K (Captain O'Conor, on the cruiser HMS Neptune) sortied from Malta at 18:00 to intercept. The force ran into a minefield (Minefield T) 20 mi (17 nmi; 32 km) off Tripoli, in the early hours of 19 December. The minefield took the British by surprise as the water-depth was 600 ft (180 m), which they had thought was too deep for mines. Neptune struck four mines and sank, the destroyer HMS Kandahar struck a mine and was scuttled the following day. The cruisers Aurora and Penelope were badly damaged but were able to return to Malta. About 830 Allied seamen, many of them New Zealanders from Neptune, were killed. The Malta Strike Force, which had been such a threat to Axis shipping to Libya during most of 1941, was much reduced in its effectiveness and was later forced to withdraw to Gibraltar.

=== Attack on Alexandria ===
While steaming back to Alexandria along with Vian's force, destroyer HMS Jervis reported an apparently successful depth-charge attack on an unidentified submarine. The only Axis submarine off Alexandria was the Italian Scirè, which was carrying a group of six Italian frogmen commandos, including Luigi Durand De La Penne, equipped with manned torpedoes. Shortly after Vian's force arrived in Alexandria, on the night of 18 December, the Italians penetrated the harbour and attacked the fleet. Jervis was damaged, a large Norwegian tanker disabled and the battleships HMS Valiant and Queen Elizabeth were severely damaged. This was a strategic change of fortune against the Allies whose effects were felt in the Mediterranean for several months.

== Results ==
Both sides achieved their strategic objectives; the British got supplies through to Malta and the Axis got their ships through to Tripoli and Benghazi, although Benghazi fell to the Eighth Army five days later, on 24 December.

== Order of battle ==
Forces present 17 December 1941

=== Italy ===
Admiral Angelo Iachino (on Littorio)

- Close covering force – Vice Admiral Raffaele de Courten (on Duca d'Aosta)
  - One battleship: Duilio
  - Three light cruisers (7a Divisione Incrociatori): Emanuele Filiberto Duca d'Aosta, Muzio Attendolo, Raimondo Montecuccoli
  - Three destroyers, Ascari, Aviere, and Camicia Nera
- Distant covering force – Vice Admiral Angelo Parona (on Gorizia)
  - Three battleships: Andrea Doria, Giulio Cesare and Littorio
  - Two heavy cruisers: Gorizia, and Trento
  - 10 destroyers, Vincenzo Gioberti, Alfredo Oriani (9a Squadriglia Cacciatorpediniere)

Maestrale (10a Squadriglia Cacciatorpediniere)
Carabiniere, Corazziere (12a Squadriglia Cacciatorpediniere)
Alpino, Bersagliere, Fuciliere, Granatiere (13a Squadriglia Cacciatorpediniere)
Antoniotto Usodimare (16a Squadriglia Cacciatorpediniere)

- Close escort:
  - Six destroyers: Saetta (7a Squadriglia Cacciatorpediniere)

Antonio da Noli, Ugolino Vivaldi (14a Squadriglia Cacciatorpediniere)
Lanzerotto Malocello, Nicolò Zeno (15a Squadriglia Cacciatorpediniere)
Emanuele Pessagno (16a Squadriglia Cacciatorpediniere)

- Pegaso
- Convoy M42
  - motorships Monginevro, Napoli, Vettor Pisani
  - freighter Ankara (German)

=== Allies ===
- Convoy Escort – Rear-Admiral Philip Vian (on Naiad)
  - Three light cruisers: HMS Naiad, Euryalus, Carlisle
  - Eight destroyers, HMS Jervis, Kimberley, Kingston, Kipling (damaged), HMAS Nizam (damaged), HMS Havock, Hasty and Decoy (14th Destroyer Flotilla)
- Convoy
  - Fast merchantman: Breconshire
- Force K
  - Two light cruisers: HMS Aurora, Penelope
  - Two destroyers HMS Lance, Lively
- Force B
  - One cruiser: HMS Neptune
  - Two destroyers: HMS Jaguar, Kandahar
- 4th Destroyer Flotilla
  - Four destroyers, HMS Sikh, Maori, Legion, HNLMS Isaac Sweers

== See also ==
- Second Battle of Sirte
