= Italian destroyer Giovanni da Verrazzano =

Destroyer of the Regia Marina

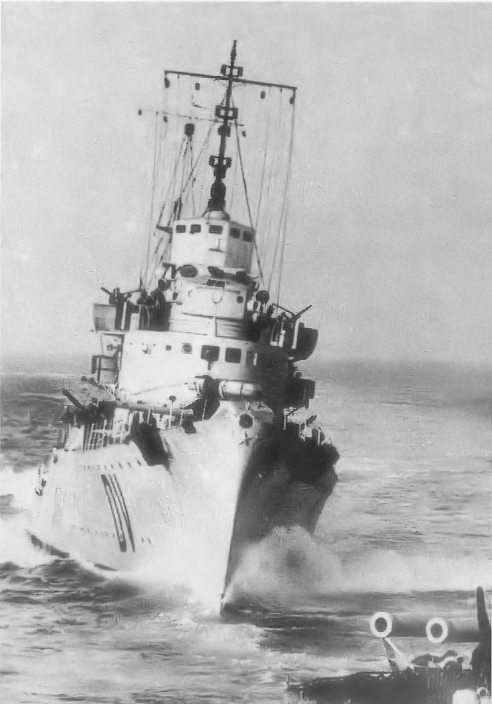
- Giovanni de Verrazzano underway, unknown date

History

Kingdom of Italy
- Name: Giovanni da Verazzano
- Namesake: Giovanni da Verazzano
- Builder: Cantieri navali del Quarnaro, Fiume
- Laid down: 17 August 1927
- Launched: 15 December 1928
- Completed: 25 September 1930
- Fate: Sunk by torpedo, 19 October 1942

General characteristics (as built)
- Class & type: Navigatori-class destroyer
- Displacement: 1,900 long tons (1,930 t) (standard); 2,580 long tons (2,621 t) (full load)
- Length: 107.3 m (352 ft)
- Beam: 10.2 m (33 ft 6 in)
- Draught: 3.5 m (11 ft 6 in)
- Installed power: 4 Yarrow boilers; 55,000 hp (41,000 kW)
- Propulsion: 2 shafts; 2 geared steam turbines
- Speed: 32 knots (59.3 km/h; 36.8 mph)
- Range: 3,800 nmi (7,000 km; 4,400 mi) at 18 knots (33 km/h; 21 mph) (designed)
- Complement: 222–225 (wartime)
- Armament: 3 × twin 120 mm (4.7 in) guns; 2 × single 40 mm (1.6 in) AA guns; 4 × twin 13.2 mm (0.52 in) machine guns; 2 × triple 533 mm (21 in) torpedo tubes; 86–104 mines

Giovanni da Verazzano was one of a dozen Navigatori-class destroyers built for the Regia Marina (Royal Italian Navy) in the late 1920s. Completed in 1930, she served in World War II.

== Design and description ==
The Navigatori-class destroyers were designed to counter the large French destroyers of the Jaguar and Guépard classes. They had an overall length of 107.3 meters (352 ft), a beam of 10.2 meters (33 ft 6 in) and a mean draft of 3.5 meters (11 ft 6 in). They displaced 1,900 metric tons (1,900 long tons) at standard load, and 2,580 metric tons (2,540 long tons) at deep load. Their complement during wartime was 222–225 officers and enlisted men.

The Navigatoris were powered by two Belluzzo geared steam turbines, each driving one propeller shaft using steam supplied by four Yarrow boilers. The turbines were designed to produce 55,000 shaft horsepower (41,000 kW) and a speed of 32 knots (59 km/h; 37 mph) in service, although the ships reached speeds of 38–41 knots (70–76 km/h; 44–47 mph) during their sea trials while lightly loaded. They carried enough fuel oil to give them a range of 3,800 nautical miles (7,000 km; 4,400 mi) at a speed of 18 knots (33 km/h; 21 mph).

Their main battery consisted of six 120-millimeter (4.7 in) guns in three twin-gun turrets, one each fore and aft of the superstructure and the third amidships. Anti-aircraft (AA) defense for the Navigatori-class ships was provided by a pair of 40-millimeter (1.6 in) AA guns in single mounts abreast the forward funnel and a pair of twin-gun mounts for 13.2-millimeter (0.52 in) machine guns. They were equipped with six 533-millimeter (21 in) torpedo tubes in two triple mounts amidships. The Navigatoris could carry 86–104 mines.

== Construction and career ==
Giovanni da Verazzano was laid down by Cantieri navali del Quarnaro at their Fiume shipyard on 17 August 1927, launched on 15 December 1928 and commissioned on 25 September 1930. From the very beginning, the destroyer developed propulsion and stability problems. With the entry of italy in World War II, Giovanni da Verrazzano was assigned to the 15th Destroyer Squadron, along with her sister ships Nicoló Zeno, Antonio Pigafetta and Alvise Da Mosto. She took part in escort operations to North Africa and mining missions off Libya and in the Sicily Channel. On August 7, 1942, Giovanni da Verrazzano, assisted by her sister Antonio Pigafetta, laid a magnetic minefield off Marsa Matruh. On 9 November1942, this barrage claimed the British minesweeper HMS Cromer, which detonated one of the mines and sank. On 19 October 1942, while defending a convoy bounded for Tripoli, Giovanni da Verrazzano was torpedoed and sunk by the British submarine HMS Unbending off Lampedusa. Twenty men went down with the destroyer.

== Bibliography ==
- Ando, Elio (1978). "The Italian Navigatori Class, 1928". In Preston, Antony (ed.). Super Destroyers. Warship Special. Vol. 2. London: Conway Maritime Press. ISBN 0-85177-131-9.
- Brescia, Maurizio (2012). Mussolini's Navy: A Reference Guide to the Regina Marina 1930–45. Annapolis, Maryland: Naval Institute Press. ISBN 978-1-59114-544-8.
- Fraccaroli, Aldo (1968). Italian Warships of World War II. Shepperton, UK: Ian Allan. ISBN 0-7110-0002-6.
- Roberts, John (1980). "Italy". In Chesneau, Roger (ed.). Conway's All the World's Fighting Ships 1922–1946. New York: Mayflower Books. pp. 280–317. ISBN 0-8317-0303-2.
- Rohwer, Jürgen (2005). Chronology of the War at Sea 1939–1945: The Naval History of World War Two (Third Revised ed.). Annapolis, Maryland: Naval Institute Press. ISBN 1-59114-119-2.
- Whitley, M. J. (1988). Destroyers of World War 2: An International Encyclopedia. Annapolis, Maryland: Naval Institute Press. ISBN 1-85409-521-8.
