= Italian destroyer Leone Pancaldo =

Destroyer of the Regia Marina

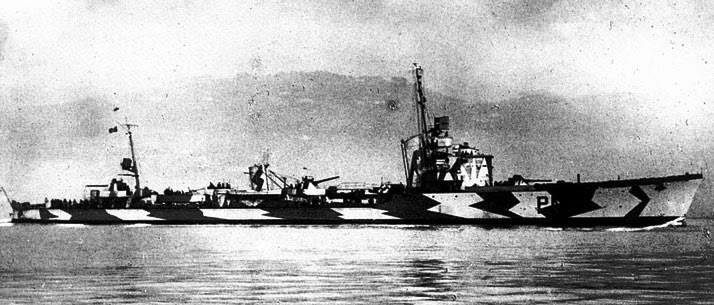
- Pancaldo in 1943

History

Kingdom of Italy
- Name: Leone Pancaldo
- Namesake: Leon Pancaldo
- Builder: Cantieri Navali Riuniti, Riva Trigoso
- Laid down: 7 July 1927
- Launched: 5 February 1929
- Completed: 30 November 1929
- Fate: Sunk by aircraft, 30 April 1943

General characteristics (as built)
- Class & type: Navigatori-class destroyer
- Displacement: 1,900 long tons (1,930 t) (standard); 2,580 long tons (2,621 t) (full load)
- Length: 107.3 m (352 ft 0 in)
- Beam: 10.2 m (33 ft 6 in)
- Draught: 3.5 m (11 ft 6 in)
- Installed power: 4 water-tube boilers; 55,000 hp (41,000 kW)
- Propulsion: 2 shafts; 2 geared steam turbines
- Speed: 32 knots (59.3 km/h; 36.8 mph)
- Range: 3,800 nmi (7,000 km; 4,400 mi) at 18 knots (33 km/h; 21 mph)
- Complement: 222–225 (wartime)
- Armament: 3 × twin 120 mm (4.7 in) guns; 2 × single 40 mm (1.6 in) AA guns; 4 × twin 13.2 mm (0.52 in) machine guns; 2 × triple 533 mm (21 in) torpedo tubes; 86–104 mines

Leone Pancaldo was one of twelve Navigatori-class destroyers built for the Regia Marina (Royal Italian Navy) between the late 1920s. Shortly after Italy's entry into World War II in June 1940, she was sunk by British torpedo bombers in Augusta, Sicily, but was later refloated and repaired. She was briefly used in fast troop transport missions to Tunisia until her second and final sinking by Allied aircraft in April 1943.

== Design and description ==
The Navigatori-class destroyers were designed to counter the large French destroyers of the Jaguar and Guépard classes. They had an overall length of 107.3 meters (352 ft), a beam of 10.2 meters (33 ft 6 in) and a mean draft of 3.5 meters (11 ft 6 in). They displaced 1,900 metric tons (1,900 long tons) at standard load, and 2,580 metric tons (2,540 long tons) at deep load. Their complement during wartime was 222–225 officers and enlisted men.

The Navigatoris were powered by two Parsons geared steam turbines, each driving one propeller shaft using steam supplied by four Odero water-tube boilers. The turbines were designed to produce 55,000 shaft horsepower (41,000 kW) and a speed of 32 knots (59 km/h; 37 mph) in service, although the ships reached speeds of 38–41 knots (70–76 km/h; 44–47 mph) during their sea trials while lightly loaded. They carried enough fuel oil to give them a range of 3,800 nautical miles (7,000 km; 4,400 mi) at a speed of 18 knots (33 km/h; 21 mph).

Their main battery consisted of six 120-millimeter (4.7 in) guns in three twin-gun turrets, one each fore and aft of the superstructure and the third amidships. Anti-aircraft (AA) defense for the Navigatori-class ships was provided by a pair of 40-millimeter (1.6 in) AA guns in single mounts abreast the forward funnel and a pair of twin-gun mounts for 13.2-millimeter (0.52 in) machine guns. They were equipped with six 533-millimeter (21 in) torpedo tubes in two triple mounts amidships. The Navigatoris could carry 86–104 mines.

== Construction and career ==
Leone Pancaldo was laid down by Cantieri Navali Riuniti at their shipyard in Riva Trigoso on 7 July 1927, launched on 5 February 1929 and completed on 30 November 1929. Between May and September 1930 she underwent modification work aimed at improving stability and seaworthiness.

During the 1930s, Pancaldo largely operated with the Italian fleet, participating in exercises in the Mediterranean Sea. Between December 1930 and January 1931 she and seven sisterships were deployed in the Atlantic Ocean in support of Italo Balbo's transatlantic flight from Italy to Brazil. Between 1936 and 1938, Pancaldo also participated in the Spanish Civil War, that saw heavy Italian naval involvement in support of Francisco Franco's forces.

Originally classified as an esploratore (flotilla leader/scout cruiser), Pancaldo was re-rated as a destroyer in 1938. After being briefly used for training in Pola, between 1939 and January 1940 she underwent further modification work to her bow in the Muggiano shipyard in La Spezia.

=== World War II ===
When Italy entered World War II, on 10 June 1940, Pancaldo was part of the 14th Destroyer Division, together with sisterships Ugolino Vivaldi, Antonio da Noli and Lanzerotto Malocello. On 9 July 1940 Pancaldo, together with Vivaldi and da Noli (the latter was however forced to go back before the start of the battle by an engine breakdown), took part in the Battle of Calabria. After the battle was over, Pancaldo and most of the fleet reached Augusta, Sicily, where they refuelled; they were spotted there by a British reconnaissance plane, and on the following day Fairey Swordfish torpedo bombers from the aircraft carrier Eagle attacked Augusta with the aim of striking the Italian fleet during its stop there. Radio intercepts, however, had alerted the Italian commands of the danger, and most of the fleet was transferred to other bases; only Pancaldo and Vivaldi, that had not yet completed refuelling, were left in the harbour when the Swordfish attacked. Both destroyers opened fire with their anti-aircraft guns, but one of the torpedoes dropped by the planes hit Pancaldo, causing her to sink in a few minutes on a 30-meter bottom, with the loss of sixteen men.

Inspection of the wreck by divers revealed that the hull was not irreparably damaged, and a decision was made to raise the ship and repair her. To lighten the ship before the salvage, many parts were removed, including her artillery and torpedo tubes; on 26 July 1941, a year after her sinking, Pancaldo was brought to the surface, and on 1 August she entered drydock. After provisional repairs that enabled her to withstand a voyage at sea, on 27 October 1941 Pancaldo left Augusta heading for Genoa, where she underwent extensive reconstruction work in the Ansaldo shipyard, lasting till 17 November 1942. She was also fitted with a Gufo radar, and re-entered service on 12 December 1942, nearly two and a half years after her sinking.

Pancaldo was assigned to the 15th Destroyer Division, based in Trapani, but she only became fully operational in March 1943. For a month she was used in fast troop transport missions to Tunisia, in company with other destroyers. On 29 April 1943 Pancaldo sailed from Pozzuoli for one such mission, together with German destroyer ZG3 Hermes; the two ships were carrying 247 and 215 German soldiers, respectively. During the trip, the destroyers were repeatedly attacked by Allied aircraft; after fending off the first two attacks, Pancaldo succumbed at about 12:30 to another attack by 50 USAAF Curtiss P-40s, and sank off Cape Bon. Of the 527 troops and crew aboard, 199 perished, mostly Italian crew members. Her commanding officer, Commander Tommaso Ferreri Caputi, was seriously wounded but survived. Hermes was seriously damaged in the same attack, but managed to reach Tunis.

== Bibliography ==
- Ando, Elio (1978). "The Italian Navigatori Class, 1928". In Preston, Antony (ed.). Super Destroyers. Warship Special. Vol. 2. London: Conway Maritime Press. ISBN 0-85177-131-9.
- Brescia, Maurizio (2012). Mussolini's Navy: A Reference Guide to the Regina Marina 1930–45. Annapolis, Maryland: Naval Institute Press. ISBN 978-1-59114-544-8.
- Fraccaroli, Aldo (1968). Italian Warships of World War II. Shepperton, UK: Ian Allan. ISBN 0-7110-0002-6.
- Roberts, John (1980). "Italy". In Chesneau, Roger (ed.). Conway's All the World's Fighting Ships 1922–1946. New York: Mayflower Books. pp. 280–317. ISBN 0-8317-0303-2.
- Rohwer, Jürgen (2005). Chronology of the War at Sea 1939–1945: The Naval History of World War Two (Third Revised ed.). Annapolis, Maryland: Naval Institute Press. ISBN 1-59114-119-2.
- Whitley, M. J. (1988). Destroyers of World War 2: An International Encyclopedia. Annapolis, Maryland: Naval Institute Press. ISBN 1-85409-521-8.
