= Italian destroyer Luca Tarigo =

Destroyer of the Regia Marina

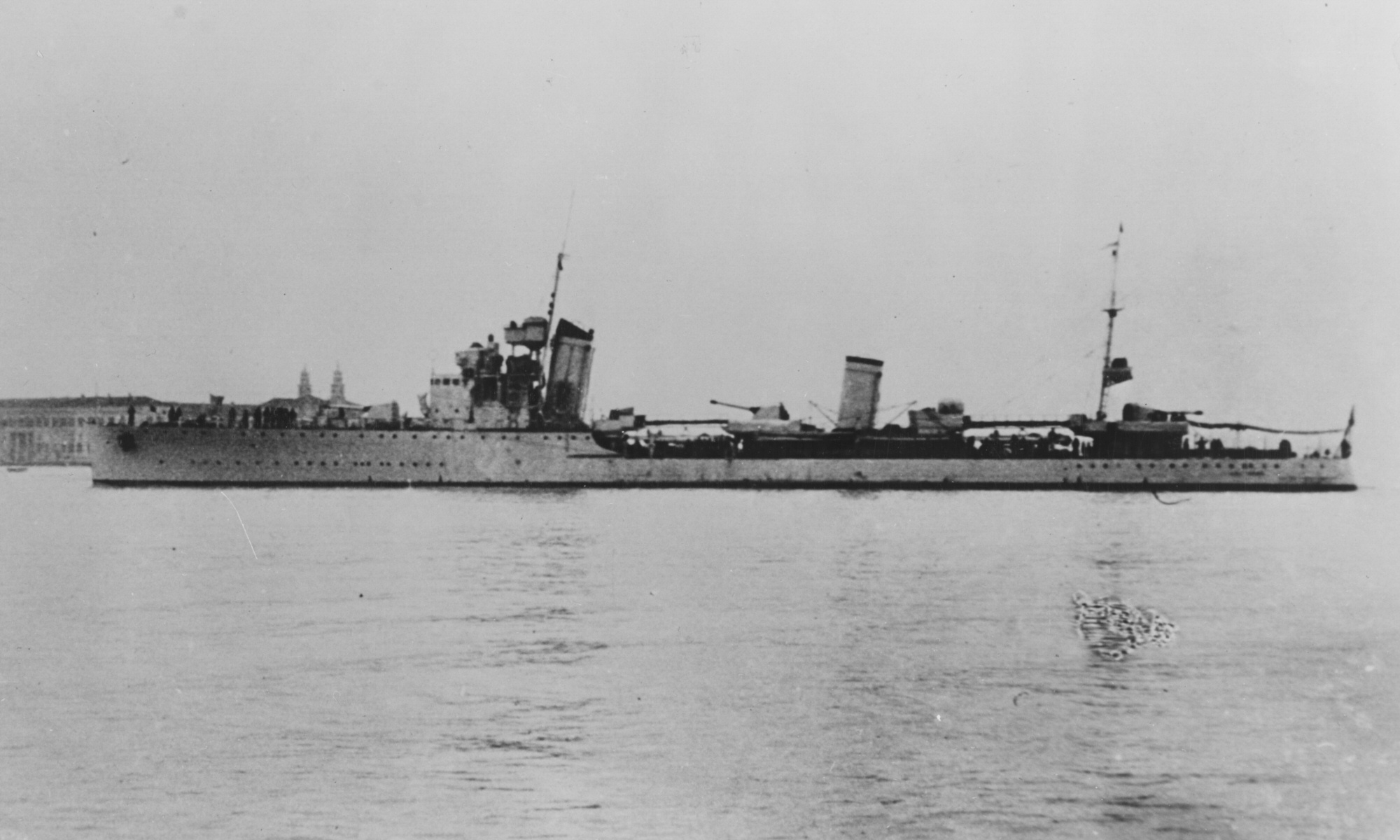
- Luca Tarigo prior to 1938

History

Kingdom of Italy
- Name: Luca Tarigo
- Namesake: Luca Tarigo
- Builder: Gio. Ansaldo & C., Genoa-Sestri Ponente
- Laid down: 30 August 1927
- Launched: 9 December 1928
- Completed: 16 November 1929
- Fate: Sunk by gunfire, 16 April 1941

General characteristics (as built)
- Class & type: Navigatori-class destroyer
- Displacement: 1,900 long tons (1,930 t) (standard); 2,580 long tons (2,621 t) (full load)
- Length: 107.3 m (352 ft)
- Beam: 10.2 m (33 ft 6 in)
- Draught: 3.5 m (11 ft 6 in)
- Installed power: 4 water-tube boilers; 55,000 hp (41,000 kW)
- Propulsion: 2 shafts; 2 geared steam turbines
- Speed: 32 knots (59.3 km/h; 36.8 mph)
- Range: 3,800 nmi (7,000 km; 4,400 mi) at 18 knots (33 km/h; 21 mph) (designed)
- Complement: 222–225 (wartime)
- Armament: 3 × twin 120 mm (4.7 in) guns; 2 × single 40 mm (1.6 in) AA guns; 4 × twin 13.2 mm (0.52 in) machine guns; 2 × triple 533 mm (21 in) torpedo tubes; 86–104 mines

Luca Tarigo was one of a dozen Navigatori-class destroyers built for the Regia Marina (Royal Italian Navy) in the late 1920s. Completed in 1929, she served in World War II.

== Design and description ==
The Navigatori-class destroyers were designed to counter the large French destroyers of the Jaguar and Guépard classes. They had an overall length of 107.3 meters (352 ft), a beam of 10.2 meters (33 ft 6 in) and a mean draft of 3.5 meters (11 ft 6 in). They displaced 1,900 metric tons (1,900 long tons) at standard load, and 2,580 metric tons (2,540 long tons) at deep load. Their complement during wartime was 222–225 officers and enlisted men.

The Navigatoris were powered by two Parsons geared steam turbines, each driving one propeller shaft using steam supplied by four Odero-Terni-Orlando water-tube boilers. The turbines were designed to produce 55,000 shaft horsepower (41,000 kW) and a speed of 32 knots (59 km/h; 37 mph) in service, although the ships reached speeds of 38–41 knots (70–76 km/h; 44–47 mph) during their sea trials while lightly loaded. They carried enough fuel oil to give them a range of 3,800 nautical miles (7,000 km; 4,400 mi) at a speed of 18 knots (33 km/h; 21 mph).

Their main battery consisted of six 120-millimeter (4.7 in) guns in three twin-gun turrets, one each fore and aft of the superstructure and the third amidships. Anti-aircraft (AA) defense for the Navigatori-class ships was provided by a pair of 40-millimeter (1.6 in) AA guns in single mounts abreast the forward funnel and a pair of twin-gun mounts for 13.2-millimeter (0.52 in) machine guns. They were equipped with six 533-millimeter (21 in) torpedo tubes in two triple mounts amidships. The Navigatoris could carry 86–104 mines.

== Construction and career ==
=== World War II ===
Tarigo was assigned to the XIV Destroyer Squadron based initially in Taranto, then in Trapani and Palermo Its tasks consisted mainly of escorting fast troop transport convoys on the Naples-Palermo-Tripoli route as well as laying mines.

On the night between 7 and 8 October 1940, the Tarigo, together with the Vivaldi twins and da Noli, laid a minefield off Cape Bon: on these mines the British destroyer Hyperion subsequently sank

Around eight o'clock in the morning of 12 October she set sail from Messina together with the two sectional units and cruisers of the III Division (Trento, Trieste, Bolzano) to rescue the units involved in the battle of Capo Passero; when it was seen that the surviving ships did not need rescue, the units that had left Messina set out in search of the British units, looking for them until after noon without identifying them

On the night between 7 and 8 January 1941, together with the twins Vivaldi, Da Noli and Malocello and the torpedo boats Vega and Sagittario, she laid the minefields "X 2" and "X 3" (180 mines each) off Cape Bon

On 22 January he took over, together with Vivaldi, Da Noli and Malocello, the destroyers Freccia and Saetta in the escort, on the Naples-Trapani route, to the troop transports Marco Polo, Conte Rosso, Esperia and Victoria: the convoy arrived unscathed in Tripoli on the 24th, despite an attack carried out by thesubmarine HMS Unique against Esperia, which was not even noticed

From 5 to 7 February she escorted from Naples to Tripoli, together with the destroyers Freccia and Saetta (which were later joined, on the 6th, by the light cruiser Bande Nere) a convoy formed by the troop transports Marco Polo, Conte Rosso, Esperia and Calitea; she also escorted ships on the return route, from 9 to 11 February

From 3 to 6 March she escorted from Naples to Tripoli, together with the destroyer Freccia and the torpedo boat Castore, a convoy of supplies for the Deutsches Afrikakorps (steamers Arta, Adana, Aegina, Sabaudia)

On 1 April, she sailed from Naples to Tripoli, escorting – together with the destroyers Euro and Baleno and the torpedo boats Polluce and Partenope – a convoy consisting of the troop transports Esperia, Conte Rosso, Marco Polo and Victoria: the ships arrived at their destination the next day

On 13 April, in the evening, she sailed from Naples to Tripoli under the command of frigate captain Pietro De Cristofaro (born in Naples on 1 September 1900) as head escort of the convoy Targio, formed by the steamers Arta, Adana, Aegina, Iserlohn and Sabaudia, loaded with ammunition, fuel, vehicles, tanks, troops and equipment for the Afrika Korps and escorted, in addition to the Tarigo, by the smaller destroyers Lampo and Baleno. On the night between the 14th and 15th the convoy was dispersed by bad weather; reassembled, it was then sighted by British reconnaissance At 2.20 a.m. on 16 April, having reached the shoals of Kerkennah (Tunisian coast), the convoy was attacked by surprise by the destroyers HMS Jervis, HMS Janus, HMS Nubian and HMS Mohawk: in the violent clash that followed, the Sabaudia, the Aegina and the Iserlohn, the Arta, the Adana, the Lightning and the Flash, reduced to floating wrecks, ended up stranded on the shallows. Leading the convoy, while the British ships attacked from the stern, the Tarigo was the last unit to be attacked; reversed course and went on the counterattack now alone against the four enemy destroyers. While maneuvering to counterattack, the ship was centered under the bridge: the government and order transmission apparatus were destroyed, Commander De Cristofaro was mortally wounded and mutilated in the leg, many other men were killed or wounded; the stern governing bodies were then activated, and the Tarigo moved within a few hundred meters of the four English ships: in the violent combat the ship was repeatedly hit and set on fire, the armament was put out of action, the crew massacred, the machines destroyed (the chief engineer, captain of the Naval Engineers Luca Balsofiore, blinded by a he had himself taken on deck and died next to De Cristofaro after telling him that the engine was useless); a group of survivors, led by sub-lieutenant Ettore Besagno, reached the only torpedo launcher complex still in operation. The Adriano Marchetti (later disappeared at sea) aimed and launched three : two hit the Mohawk, and sank the destroyer with the loss of 41 sailors.

In the fighting and subsequent sinking, Commander De Cristofaro, 7 other officers died or disappeared (among the officers of the Tarigo there were only 3 survivors out of 11) and almost all the crew leaving only 36 survivors. The Gold Medal for Military Valor was awarded to the memory of Commander De Cristofaro and Chief Engineer Balsofiore

During the conflict, Tarigo had participated in 30 war missions for a total of about 18,000 miles of navigation

In 1950-1951 the wreck of the ship was identified at a shallow depth by the company "MICOPERI" (Minio Contivecchi Recuperi) and partially dismantled to recover its precious metals

=== Commanders ===
Frigate Captain Pietro De Cristofaro (born in Naples on 1 September 1900) (+) (1 November 1939 – 16 April 1941)

== Bibliography ==
- Ando, Elio (1978). "The Italian Navigatori Class, 1928". In Preston, Antony (ed.). Super Destroyers. Warship Special. Vol. 2. London: Conway Maritime Press. ISBN 0-85177-131-9.
- Brescia, Maurizio (2012). Mussolini's Navy: A Reference Guide to the Regina Marina 1930–45. Annapolis, Maryland: Naval Institute Press. ISBN 978-1-59114-544-8.
- Fraccaroli, Aldo (1968). Italian Warships of World War II. Shepperton, UK: Ian Allan. ISBN 0-7110-0002-6.
- Roberts, John (1980). "Italy". In Chesneau, Roger (ed.). Conway's All the World's Fighting Ships 1922–1946. New York: Mayflower Books. pp. 280–317. ISBN 0-8317-0303-2.
- Rohwer, Jürgen (2005). Chronology of the War at Sea 1939–1945: The Naval History of World War Two (Third Revised ed.). Annapolis, Maryland: Naval Institute Press. ISBN 1-59114-119-2.
- Whitley, M. J. (1988). Destroyers of World War 2: An International Encyclopedia. Annapolis, Maryland: Naval Institute Press. ISBN 1-85409-521-8.
