= Navigatori-class destroyer =

Italian military ships

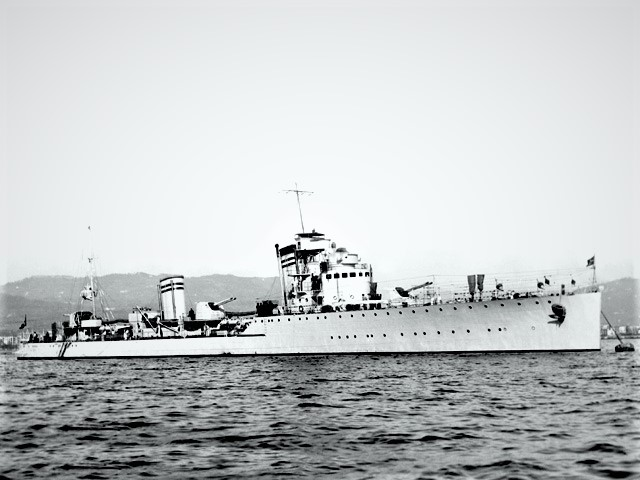
- Nicolò Zeno

Class overview
- Name: Navigatori class
- Operators: Regia Marina; Marina Militare; Kriegsmarine
- Preceded by: Turbine class
- Succeeded by: Freccia class
- Built: 1928–1929
- In commission: 1929–1954
- Completed: 12
- Lost: 11

General characteristics (as built)
- Type: Destroyer
- Displacement: 1,900 long tons (1,930 t) (standard); 2,580 long tons (2,621 t) (full load)
- Length: 107.28 m (352 ft 0 in)
- Beam: 10.2 m (33 ft 6 in)
- Draught: 3.4 m (11 ft 2 in)
- Installed power: 4 water-tube boilers; 55,000 hp (41,000 kW)
- Propulsion: 2 shafts; 2 geared steam turbines
- Speed: 32 knots (59.3 km/h; 36.8 mph)
- Range: 3,800 nmi (7,000 km; 4,400 mi) at 18 knots (33 km/h; 21 mph)
- Complement: 222–225 (wartime)
- Armament: 3 × twin 120 mm (4.7 in) guns; 2 × single 40 mm (1.6 in) AA guns; 4 × twin 13.2 mm (0.52 in) machine guns; 6 × 533 mm (21 in) torpedo tubes; 86–104 mines

The Navigatori class were a group of Italian destroyers built in 1928–1929 for the Regia Marina (Royal Italian Navy), named after Italian explorers. They fought in World War II. Just one vessel, Nicoloso Da Recco, survived the conflict.

== Design ==
These ships were built for the Regia Marina as a reply to the large contre-torpilleurs of the Jaguar and Guépard classes built for the French Navy. These ships were significantly larger than other contemporary Italian destroyers and were initially classed as esploratori or scouts. They were re-rated as destroyers in 1938.

The main armament was a new model 120-millimeter (4.7 in)/50 gun in three twin turrets which allowed for 45° elevation. The torpedo launchers consisted of two triple banks, each unusually comprising two 533 mm (21 in) separated by one 450 mm (18 in). Two rangefinder positions were provided; one above the bridge and one in the after superstructure.

Unit machinery was used comprising four boilers in two widely spaced boiler rooms and two turbine rooms. The forward unit drove the port shaft and the aft unit drove the starboard shaft. Trials were run light and with overloaded machinery leading to speeds of up to 43.5 knots (80.6 km/h; 50.1 mph) which were not achievable under service conditions.

The ships were fast, but were found to lack stability and were rebuilt with clipper bows, increased beam and reduced superstructure in the late 1930s.

During the war the torpedoes were replaced by triple 21-inch tubes and extra anti-aircraft guns were added.

== Ships ==
Construction data
Ship	Named after	Builder	Commissioned	Operational history
Alvise Da Mosto	Alvise Cadamosto	CNQ, Fiume	15 March 1931	Sunk by HMS Aurora and HMS Penelope near Tripoli, 1 December 1941, while escorting the tanker Iridio Mantovani
Antonio da Noli	Antonio da Noli	CT, Riva Trigoso	29 December 1929	Sunk by mines in the Strait of Bonifacio on 9 September 1943
Nicoloso da Recco	Nicoloso da Recco	CNR, Ancona	20 May 1930	Decommissioned on 15 July 1954 and scrapped
Giovanni da Verrazzano	Giovanni da Verrazzano	CNQ, Fiume	25 September 1930	Sunk 19 October 1942 by HMS Unbending
Lanzerotto Malocello	Lanzerotto Malocello	Ansaldo, Genoa	18 January 1930	Lost on 24 March 1943 to a mine north of Cape Bon
Leone Pancaldo	Leon Pancaldo	CT, Riva Trigoso	30 November 1929	Bombed and sunk on 30 April 1943
Emanuele Pessagno	Emanuele Pessagno	CNR, Ancona	10 March 1930	Torpedoed and sunk by British submarine HMS Turbulent, 29 May 1942
Antonio Pigafetta	Antonio Pigafetta	CNQ, Fiume	1 May 1931	Captured by the Germans after the Italian armistice with the Allies, served as TA44; sunk at Trieste by air raid on 21 February 1945
Luca Tarigo	Luca Tarigo	Ansaldo, Genoa	16 November 1929	Sunk by British destroyers on 16 April 1941
Antoniotto Usodimare	Antoniotto Usodimare	Odero, Sestri Ponente	21 November 1929	Sunk by the Italian submarine Alagi, 8 June 1942
Ugolino Vivaldi	Ugolino Vivaldi	Odero, Sestri Ponente	6 March 1930	Following the Italian Armistice, she was damaged by German coastal artillery in the Strait of Bonifacio and bombed by German aircraft while attempting to reach internment in Spain. Unable to reach Spain, she was scuttled by her crew on 10 September 1943.
Nicolò Zeno	Nicolò Zeno	CNQ, Fiume	27 May 1930	Scuttled in Trieste on 9 September 1943 to prevent capture by the Germans following the Italian Armistice

== Bibliography ==
- Ando, Elio (1978). "The Italian Navigatori Class, 1928". In Preston, Antony (ed.). Super Destroyers. Warship Special. Vol. II. London: Conway Maritime Press. ISBN 0-85177-131-9.
- Brescia, Maurizio (2012). Mussolini's Navy: A Reference Guide to the Regina Marina 1930–45. Annapolis, MD: Naval Institute Press. ISBN 978-1-59114-544-8.
- Campbell, John (1985). Naval Weapons of World War Two. Annapolis, MD: Naval Institute Press. ISBN 0-87021-459-4.
- Fraccaroli, Aldo (1968). Italian Warships of World War II. Shepperton: Ian Allan. ISBN 0-7110-0002-6.
- Roberts, John (1980). "Italy". In Chesneau, Roger (ed.). Conway's All the World's Fighting Ships 1922–1946. New York: Mayflower Books. pp. 280–317. ISBN 0-8317-0303-2.
- Rohwer, Jürgen (2005). Chronology of the War at Sea 1939–1945: The Naval History of World War Two (3rd. rev. ed.). Annapolis, MD: Naval Institute Press. ISBN 1-59114-119-2.
- Shores, Cull & Malizia (1991). Malta: The Spitfire Year 1942. Grub Street. ISBN 0-948817-16-X
- Smigielski, Adam (1995). "Italy". In Chumbley, Stephen (ed.). Conway's All the World's Fighting Ships 1947–1995. Annapolis, MD: Naval Institute Press. pp. 195–218. ISBN 1-55750-132-7.
- Whitley, M. J. (1988). Destroyers of World War 2: An International Encyclopaedia. Annapolis, MD: Naval Institute Press. ISBN 1-85409-521-8.
