= Guido Porzio Giovanola =

Italian admiral (1886–1943)

- Born: 25 March 1886; Piacenza, Kingdom of Italy
- Died: 21 March 1943 (aged 57); Apuania, Kingdom of Italy
- Military career
- Allegiance: Kingdom of Italy
- Branch: Regia Marina
- Service years: 1904-1943
- Rank: Vice Admiral
- Commands: Giuseppe Sirtori (destroyer); Giuseppe Missori (destroyer); Palestro (destroyer); Tigre; Bartolomeo Colleoni (light cruiser); La Spezia Naval Base; 4th Naval Division; 5th Naval Division; 9th Naval Division; Albania Naval Command
- Conflicts: Italo-Turkish War; World War I; Adriatic Campaign of World War I; World War II; Battle of the Mediterranean; First Battle of Sirte
- Awards: War Cross for Military Valor; War Merit Cross (twice); Military Order of Savoy; Order of Saints Maurice and Lazarus; Order of the Crown of Italy; Iron Cross second class

Guido Porzio Giovanola (25 March 1886 – 21 March 1943) was an Italian admiral in the Regia Marina during World War II.

== Biography ==
Born in Piacenza in 1885, figlio di Giuseppe, ingegnere, e Giuseppina Moriondi he entered the Naval Academy of Livorno in 1904, graduating in 1907 with the rank of ensign. He then participated in the Italo-Turkish War as a sub-lieutenant on the battleship Sicilia and on the gunboat Giuliana, earning a War Cross for Military Valor. In 1914 he was promoted to lieutenant and then participated in the First World War on the armoured cruiser San Giorgio. He later commanded a torpedo boat and was promoted to lieutenant commander in 1921.

After commanding the destroyers Giuseppe Sirtori and Giuseppe Missori, he was promoted to commander in 1925, and later received shore assignments at the headquarters of the Naval Department of Taranto and at the Naval Weapons Directorate in Rome. In 1930-1932 he commanded the destroyer Palestro and her destroyer squadron and later the flotilla leader Tigre. In 1934 he was promoted to captain and commanded for two years the light cruiser Bartolomeo Colleoni, after which in 1937 he was assigned for a short period to the High Council of the Navy, being promoted to rear admiral.

From 1938 to 1941 he commanded the La Spezia Naval Arsenal, being promoted to vice admiral in 1939, and then commanded the 4th, the 5th and the 9th Naval Division between 10 May 1941 and 8 April 1942, participating in convoy operations and in the First Battle of Sirte and receiving the Knight's Cross of the Military Order of Savoy and the War Merit Cross by Italy, and the Iron Cross second class by Germany. He was then appointed naval commander of Albania until February 1943, when he fell seriously hill and was hospitalized in the military hospital of Apuania. There he died on 21 March 1943.
