= Italian destroyer Alvise da Mosto =

Destroyer of the Regia Marina

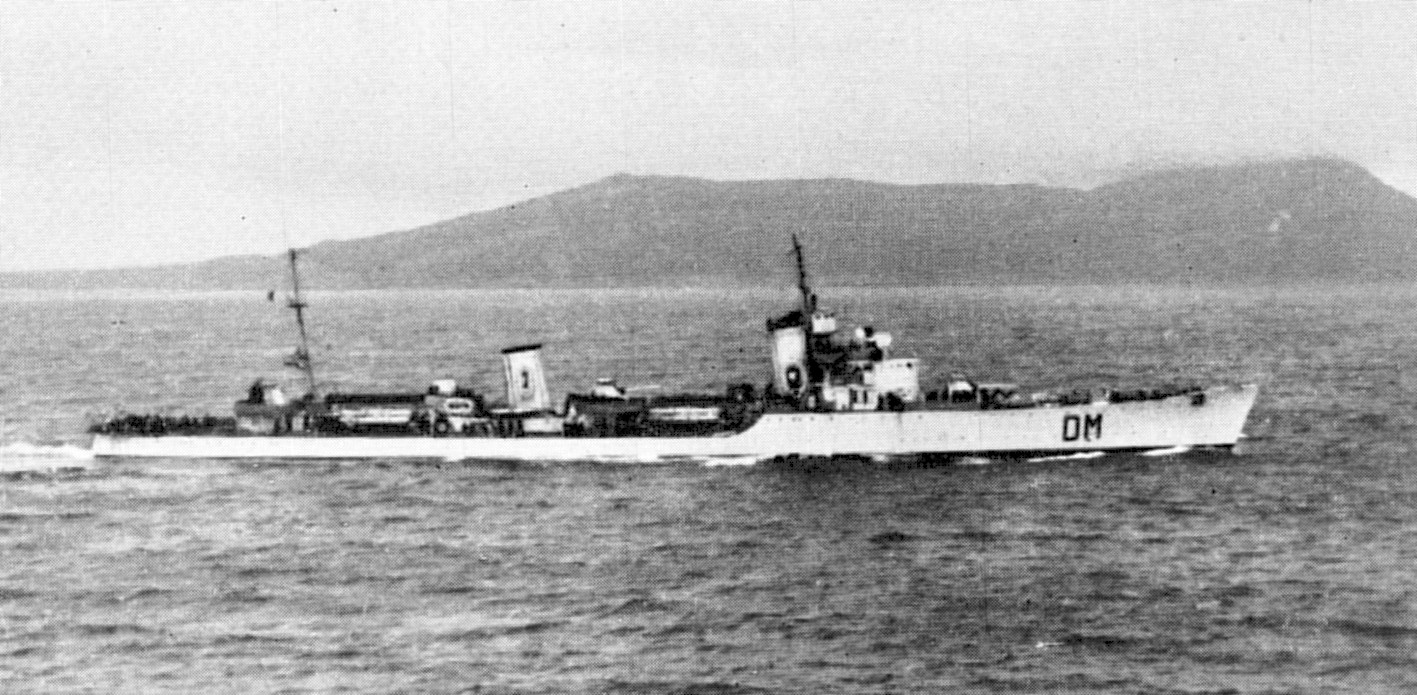
- Da Mosto during World War II

History

Kingdom of Italy
- Name: Alvise Da Mosto
- Namesake: Alvise Cadamosto
- Builder: Cantieri Riuniti del Quarnaro, Fiume
- Laid down: 22 August 1928
- Launched: 1 July 1929
- Completed: 15 March 1931
- Fate: Sunk in battle, 1 December 1941

General characteristics (as built)
- Class & type: Navigatori-class destroyer
- Displacement: 1,900 long tons (1,930 t) (standard); 2,580 long tons (2,621 t) (full load)
- Length: 107.3 m (352 ft)
- Beam: 10.2 m (33 ft 6 in)
- Draught: 3.5 m (11 ft 6 in)
- Installed power: 4 Yarrow boilers; 55,000 hp (41,000 kW)
- Propulsion: 2 shafts; 2 geared steam turbines
- Speed: 32 knots (59.3 km/h; 36.8 mph)
- Range: 3,800 nmi (7,000 km; 4,400 mi) at 18 knots (33 km/h; 21 mph) (designed)
- Complement: 222–225 (wartime)
- Armament: 3 × twin 120 mm (4.7 in) guns; 2 × single 40 mm (1.6 in) AA guns; 4 × twin 13.2 mm (0.52 in) machine guns; 2 × triple 533 mm (21 in) torpedo tubes; 86–104 mines

Service record
- Part of: Destroyer Division 15
- Operations: Battle of the Mediterranean

Alvise Da Mosto was one of twelve Navigatori-class destroyers, built for the Regia Marina (Royal Italian Navy) between the late 1920s and the early 1930s. During World War II, she participated in several minelaying missions in the Sicilian Channel and escorted convoys between Italy and Libya until her sinking by the British Force K.

== Design and description ==
The Navigatori-class destroyers were designed to counter the large French destroyers of the Jaguar and Guépard classes. They had an overall length of 107.3 meters (352 ft), a beam of 10.2 meters (33 ft 6 in) and a mean draft of 3.5 meters (11 ft 6 in). They displaced 1,900 metric tons (1,900 long tons) at standard load, and 2,580 metric tons (2,540 long tons) at deep load. Their complement during wartime was 222–225 officers and enlisted men.

The Navigatoris were powered by two Belluzzo geared steam turbines, each driving one propeller shaft using steam supplied by four Yarrow boilers. The turbines were designed to produce 55,000 shaft horsepower (41,000 kW) and a speed of 32 knots (59 km/h; 37 mph) in service, although the ships reached speeds of 38–41 knots (70–76 km/h; 44–47 mph) during their sea trials while lightly loaded. They carried enough fuel oil to give them a range of 3,800 nautical miles (7,000 km; 4,400 mi) at a speed of 18 knots (33 km/h; 21 mph).

Their main battery consisted of six 120-millimeter (4.7 in) guns in three twin-gun turrets, one each fore and aft of the superstructure and the third amidships. Anti-aircraft (AA) defense for the Navigatori-class ships was provided by a pair of 40-millimeter (1.6 in) AA guns in single mounts abreast the forward funnel and a pair of twin-gun mounts for 13.2-millimeter (0.52 in) machine guns. They were equipped with six 533-millimeter (21 in) torpedo tubes in two triple mounts amidships. The Navigatoris could carry 86–104 mines.

== Construction and career ==
Alvise Da Mosto, built at the Cantieri Riuniti del Quarnaro in Fiume, was laid down on 22 August 1928, launched on 1 July 1929 and completed on 15 March 1931. During the sea trials she reached a top speed of 42.7 knots (79.1 km/h), the fastest ship in her class. As the destroyer was the next-to-last of her class to enter service, she had already received the modifications that her sisterships needed after completion in order to improve stability and seaworthiness.

During the 1930s, Da Mosto operated with the Italian fleet for most of the time, taking part in naval exercises. She also sailed to South America for an official visit together with sister ship Emanuele Pessagno. Between 1936 and 1937 she participated in Italian naval operations linked to the Spanish Civil War, escorting ships that carried troops and supplies for Francisco Franco's forces from Italy to Spain.

Originally classified as an esploratore (flotilla leader/scout cruiser), Da Mosto was re-rated as a destroyer in 1938.

== World War II ==
When Italy entered World War II, on 10 June 1940, Da Mosto was undergoing modification work to her bow in the La Spezia Naval Arsenal, and she only re-entered service in August 1940, and was assigned to the 15th Destroyer Division.

On 1–2 September 1940 Da Mosto was part of the Italian force that sortied to counter British Operation "Hats", and at the end of the same month she participated in the contrast to British operation "MB 5".

Between April and August 1941 Da Mosto, together with some of her sisterships and the light cruisers of the 7th Cruiser Division, took part in the laying of several minefields in the Sicilian Channel and off the coast of Tripolitania. In the same period, she also escorted some supply convoys to Libya. In November 1941 she was equipped with a German S-Gerät sonar.

On 30 November 1941, Da Mosto sailed from Trapani to escort to Tripoli the tanker Iridio Mantovani, carrying, 8,600 tons of fuel for the Axis forces in North Africa. On 1 December, just before sunset, Mantovani was crippled by Bristol Blenheim bombers of the Royal Air Force; Da Mosto tried to take her in tow, but another air strike set the tanker on fire, and she had to be abandoned by her crew. Shortly thereafter, Da Mosto was attacked by the British Force K, consisting of the cruisers Aurora and Penelope and the destroyer Lively. Da Mosto engaged the British ships in a last attempt to save as many survivors as possible from the sinking tanker, but was hit multiple times, including in one of her magazines, and quickly sank at 18:15 in 33°53' N, 12°28' E, about 75 miles northwest of Tripoli. Mantovani's blazing wreck was also finished off by Force K.

138 members of Da Mosto's crew were killed, while 125 survivors were later rescued by the Italian torpedo boat Generale Marcello Prestinari. Da Mosto's commanding officer, Commander Francesco Dell'Anno, was awarded the Gold Medal of Military Valor for his attempt to defend Mantovani against overwhelming forces.

== Bibliography ==
- Ando, Elio (1978). "The Italian Navigatori Class, 1928". In Preston, Antony (ed.). Super Destroyers. Warship Special. Vol. 2. London: Conway Maritime Press. ISBN 0-85177-131-9.
- Brescia, Maurizio (2012). Mussolini's Navy: A Reference Guide to the Regina Marina 1930–45. Annapolis, Maryland: Naval Institute Press. ISBN 978-1-59114-544-8.
- Fraccaroli, Aldo (1968). Italian Warships of World War II. Shepperton, UK: Ian Allan. ISBN 0-7110-0002-6.
- Roberts, John (1980). "Italy". In Chesneau, Roger (ed.). Conway's All the World's Fighting Ships 1922–1946. New York: Mayflower Books. pp. 280–317. ISBN 0-8317-0303-2.
- Rohwer, Jürgen (2005). Chronology of the War at Sea 1939–1945: The Naval History of World War Two (Third Revised ed.). Annapolis, Maryland: Naval Institute Press. ISBN 1-59114-119-2.
- Whitley, M. J. (1988). Destroyers of World War 2: An International Encyclopedia. Annapolis, Maryland: Naval Institute Press. ISBN 1-85409-521-8.
