= Italian destroyer Antonio Pigafetta =

Destroyer of the Regia Marina

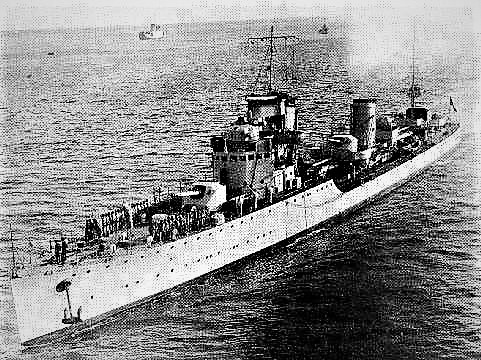
- Antonio Pigafetta

History

Kingdom of Italy
- Name: Antonio Pigafetta
- Namesake: Antonio Pigafetta
- Builder: Cantieri navali del Quarnaro, Fiume
- Laid down: 29 December 1928
- Launched: 10 November 1929
- Completed: 1 May 1931
- Fate: Captured by the Germans, 9 September 1943

Nazi Germany
- Name: TA44
- Acquired: September 1943
- Fate: Sunk by Allied aircraft, 17 February 1945

General characteristics (as built)
- Class & type: Navigatori-class destroyer
- Displacement: 1,900 long tons (1,930 t) (standard); 2,580 long tons (2,621 t) (full load)
- Length: 107.3 m (352 ft)
- Beam: 10.2 m (33 ft 6 in)
- Draught: 3.5 m (11 ft 6 in)
- Installed power: 4 Yarrow boilers; 55,000 shp (41,000 kW)
- Propulsion: 2 shafts; 2 geared steam turbines
- Speed: 32 knots (59.3 km/h; 36.8 mph)
- Range: 3,800 nmi (7,000 km; 4,400 mi) at 18 knots (33 km/h; 21 mph) (designed)
- Complement: 222–225 (wartime)
- Armament: 3 × twin 120 mm (4.7 in) guns; 2 × single 40 mm (1.6 in) AA guns; 4 × twin 13.2 mm (0.52 in) machine guns; 2 × triple 533 mm (21 in) torpedo tubes; 86–104 mines

Antonio Pigafetta was an Italian destroyer, and one of a dozen Navigatori-class destroyers built for the Regia Marina (Royal Italian Navy) in the late 1920s. Completed in 1931, she served in World War II. She was captured by German forces, but was later sunk by Allied aircraft in 1945.

== Design and description ==
The Navigatori-class destroyers were designed to counter the large French destroyers of the Jaguar and Guépard classes. They had an overall length of 107.3 meters (352 ft), a beam of 10.2 meters (33 ft 6 in) and a mean draft of 3.5 meters (11 ft 6 in). They displaced 1,900 metric tons (1,900 long tons) at standard load, and 2,580 metric tons (2,540 long tons) at deep load. Their complement during wartime was 222–225 officers and enlisted men.

The Navigatoris were powered by two Parsons geared steam turbines, each driving one propeller shaft using steam supplied by four Odero-Terni-Orlando water-tube boilers. The turbines were designed to produce 55,000 shaft horsepower (41,000 kW) and a speed of 32 knots (59 km/h; 37 mph) in service, although the ships reached speeds of 38–41 knots (70–76 km/h; 44–47 mph) during their sea trials while lightly loaded. They carried enough fuel oil to give them a range of 3,800 nautical miles (7,000 km; 4,400 mi) at a speed of 18 knots (33 km/h; 21 mph).

Their main battery consisted of six 120-millimeter (4.7 in) guns in three twin-gun turrets, one each fore and aft of the superstructure and the third amidships. Anti-aircraft (AA) defense for the Navigatori-class ships was provided by a pair of 40-millimeter (1.6 in) AA guns in single mounts abreast the forward funnel and a pair of twin-gun mounts for 13.2-millimeter (0.52 in) machine guns. They were equipped with six 533-millimeter (21 in) torpedo tubes in two triple mounts amidships. The Navigatoris could carry 86–104 mines.

== Construction and career ==
Antonio Pigafetta was laid down by Cantieri navali del Quarnaro at their Fiume shipyard on 29 December 1928, launched on 10 November 1929 and commissioned on 1 May 1931. During her service under Italian flag, Antonio Pigafetta carried out escort missions, anti-submarine operations, laid down defensive and offensive mine barrages and bombarded enemy positions in the course of the Greek campaign. On 9 November 1942, the British minesweeper HMS Cromer hit a magnetic mine and sank on a minefield laid out by Antonio Pigafetta and her sister Giovanni da Verrazzano off Marsa Matruh on 7 August 1942. On 10 September 1943, the Italian destroyer Antonio Pigafetta was seized by German forces in Fiume. Following repairs, it was recommissioned as TA-44 on 14 October 1944, and became part of the 9th Torpedoboot Flotilla. The ship was sunk in the port of Trieste on 17 February 1945, after being hit by an allied aircraft bomb. The ship was likely sunk by the 461st Operations Group (Heavy), a World War II United States Army Air Forces, which typically flew the B-24 Liberator.

== Bibliography ==
- Ando, Elio (1978). "The Italian Navigatori Class, 1928". In Preston, Antony (ed.). Super Destroyers. Warship Special. Vol. 2. London: Conway Maritime Press. ISBN 0-85177-131-9.
- Brescia, Maurizio (2012). Mussolini's Navy: A Reference Guide to the Regina Marina 1930–45. Annapolis, MD: Naval Institute Press. ISBN 978-1-59114-544-8.
- Fraccaroli, Aldo (1968). Italian Warships of World War II. Shepperton: Ian Allan. ISBN 0-7110-0002-6.
- Roberts, John (1980). "Italy". In Chesneau, Roger (ed.). Conway's All the World's Fighting Ships 1922–1946. New York: Mayflower Books. pp. 280–317. ISBN 0-8317-0303-2.
- Rohwer, Jürgen (2005). Chronology of the War at Sea 1939–1945: The Naval History of World War Two (3rd rev. ed.). Annapolis, MD: Naval Institute Press. ISBN 1-59114-119-2.
- Stille, Mark (2021). Italian Destroyers of World War II. London: Bloomsbury Publishing. ISBN 978-1-4728-4053-0.
- Whitley, M. J. (1988). Destroyers of World War 2: An International Encyclopedia. Annapolis, MD: Naval Institute Press. ISBN 1-85409-521-8.
- "February 1945 Missions". 461st.org. Retrieved 2024-02-26.
