= Italian destroyer Ugolino Vivaldi =

Italian Navigatori-class destroyer

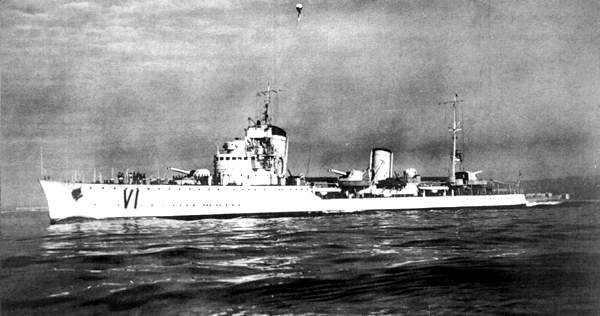
- Ugolino Vivaldi

History

Kingdom of Italy
- Name: Ugolino Vivaldi
- Namesake: Ugolino Vivaldi
- Builder: Cantieri navali Odero, Sestri Ponente
- Laid down: 16 May 1927
- Launched: 9 January 1929
- Completed: 6 March 1930
- Fate: Scuttled following damage by coastal battery and aircraft, 10 September 1943

General characteristics (as built)
- Class & type: Navigatori-class destroyer
- Displacement: 1,900 long tons (1,930 t) (standard); 2,580 long tons (2,621 t) (full load)
- Length: 107.3 m (352 ft)
- Beam: 10.2 m (33 ft 6 in)
- Draught: 3.5 m (11 ft 6 in)
- Installed power: 4 water-tube boilers; 55,000 hp (41,000 kW)
- Propulsion: 2 shafts; 2 geared steam turbines
- Speed: 32 knots (59.3 km/h; 36.8 mph)
- Range: 3,800 nmi (7,000 km; 4,400 mi) at 18 knots (33 km/h; 21 mph) (designed)
- Complement: 222–225 (wartime)
- Armament: 3 × twin 120 mm (4.7 in) guns; 2 × single 40 mm (1.6 in) AA guns; 4 × twin 13.2 mm (0.52 in) machine guns; 2 × triple 533 mm (21 in) torpedo tubes; 86–104 mines

Service record
- Part of: Destroyer Division 14
- Operations: Battle of the Mediterranean; Battle of Calabria; Operation Harpoon; Operation Achse

Ugolino Vivaldi was one of twelve Navigatori-class destroyers built for the Regia Marina (Royal Italian Navy) between the late 1920s and the early 1930s.

== Design and description ==
The Navigatori-class destroyers were designed to counter the large French destroyers of the Jaguar and Guépard classes. They had an overall length of 107.3 meters (352 ft), a beam of 10.2 meters (33 ft 6 in) and a mean draft of 3.5 meters (11 ft 6 in). They displaced 1,900 metric tons (1,900 long tons) at standard load, and 2,580 metric tons (2,540 long tons) at deep load. Their complement during wartime was 222–225 officers and enlisted men.

The Navigatoris were powered by two Parsons geared steam turbines, each driving one propeller shaft using steam supplied by four Odero-Terni-Orlando water-tube boilers. The turbines were designed to produce 55,000 shaft horsepower (41,000 kW) and a speed of 32 knots (59 km/h; 37 mph) in service, although the ships reached speeds of 38–41 knots (70–76 km/h; 44–47 mph) during their sea trials while lightly loaded. They carried enough fuel oil to give them a range of 3,800 nautical miles (7,000 km; 4,400 mi) at a speed of 18 knots (33 km/h; 21 mph).

Their main battery consisted of six 120-millimeter (4.7 in) guns in three twin-gun turrets, one each fore and aft of the superstructure and the third amidships. Anti-aircraft (AA) defense for the Navigatori-class ships was provided by a pair of 40-millimeter (1.6 in) AA guns in single mounts abreast the forward funnel and a pair of twin-gun mounts for 13.2-millimeter (0.52 in) machine guns. They were equipped with six 533-millimeter (21 in) torpedo tubes in two triple mounts amidships. The Navigatoris could carry 86–104 mines.

== Construction and career ==
Ugolino Vivaldi was laid down by Odero-Terni-Orlando at their Genoa-Sestri Ponente shipyard on 16 May 1927, launched on 9 January 1929 and commissioned on 6 March 1930.

During the 1930s, Vivaldi largely operated with the Italian fleet, participating in exercises in the Mediterranean Sea. Between December 1930 and January 1931 she and seven sister ships were deployed in the Atlantic Ocean in support of Italo Balbo's transatlantic flight from Italy to Brazil. Between 1936 and 1938, Vivaldi also participated in the Spanish Civil War, that saw heavy Italian naval involvement in support of Francisco Franco's forces.

Originally classified as an esploratore (flotilla leader/scout cruiser), Vivaldi was re-rated as a destroyer in 1938. In 1939-1940 she underwent modification work to her bow.

== World War II ==
When Italy entered World War II, on 10 June 1940, Vivaldi, under Captain Giovanni Galati was the flagship of the 14th Destroyer Division, which she formed along with sisterships Leone Pancaldo, Antonio da Noli and Lanzerotto Malocello.

In August 1940, Vivaldi rammed and sank a submarine, HMS Oswald, then rescuing nearly her entire crew. In the next year and a half she escorted dozens of supply convoys between Italy and North Africa and gained a reputation for "never losing a ship". This was credited to the fact that Captain Galati often disregarded orders coming from Supermarina, instead basing his decisions on his own assessment and experience; like other officers at the time, he was convinced that traitors hiding in the high ranks were informing the Allies about the convoys sailing for Africa, and that disregarding the instructions would reduce the risk of being intercepted (actually, the interception of many convoys was not caused by traitors, but instead by Ultra intercepts, whose existence was unknown to the Axis). During escort operations in late 1941 and early 1942, Vivaldi often served as flagship for Admiral Amedeo Nomis di Pollone, commander of the Fleet Destroyer Group.

In June 1942 Vivaldi, now under Captain Ignazio Castrogiovanni, participated in an attack against a British convoy to Malta (Operation Harpoon) and, while clashing with the escorting destroyers, received a hit in the engine rooms that started a massive fire and left her dead in the water. The crippled Vivaldi and her consort Malocello ended up facing five British destroyers (Bedouin, Partridge, Marne, Matchless, Ithuriel), and at one point Captain Castrogiovanni radioed "I will fight to the last, long live the king" and ordered Malocello to abandon Vivaldi to her fate and save herself. Malocello refused, and remained to protect her disabled sistership. At this point the British escort leader, who at the time was facing the bulk of the Italian attack force (two cruisers and another three destroyers) a few miles away, recalled his destroyers to disengage Vivaldi and Malocello and assist in the main battle. The fire on Vivaldi burned for hours, virtually cutting the ship in two, with the crew in the bow unable to go to the stern and vice versa, but in the end the flames were extinguished and she was towed to port. Repairs for this damage took nearly one year.

On 9 September 1943, following the Italian Armistice, Vivaldi and sistership Da Noli were ordered to sail from Genoa to Civitavecchia, near Rome, where they would embark the king and the government and bring them to La Maddalena, Sardinia, to prevent them from being captured by the German forces, that had launched Operation Achse. However when the two ships arrived near Civitavecchia, the order was rescinded, as the Germans had already taken the Rome-Civitavecchia road and the king had fled towards Pescara, on the opposite coast of Italy. Vivaldi and Da Noli were ordered to sail west to meet the rest of the Italian fleet off La Maddalena, and once they were there, they were ordered to engage German craft that were transferring German troops from Sardinia to Corsica. They did so, and sank or damaged some of these craft, but they ended under fire from the coastal batteries on the Corsican coast, whose personnel – belonging to the Blackshirts – had turned over to the Germans. Da Noli sank on a mine, and Vivaldi was badly damaged, but managed to limp away. A few hours later, while sailing west at reduced speed, she was attacked again by German bombers, and further damaged by a Henschel Hs 293 guided missile. She still carried on for some more hours at a speed of a few knots, while the crew struggled to save the ship; but in the end her badly damaged engines ceased working, and her commanding officer, Captain Francesco Camicia, ordered her scuttled. Vivaldi sank on 10 September, about 50 miles west of Asinara island, taking down with her Lieutenant Commander Alessandro Cavriani and petty officer Virginio Fasan, who had gone back aboard to speed up her sinking.

Some of Vivaldi's survivors were rescued by German floatplanes that were strafed and destroyed by American aircraft immediately thereafter, killing some of them. Others were picked up by a German vessel and ended up in POW camps in Germany, and some were rescued by an American floatplane. Another group was picked up by a British submarine, HMS Sportsman, which brought them to Algeria, and dozens more reached the Balearic Islands (Spain) after spending days at sea in various boats, some of them staying adrift for a week or more. Overall, 58 members of her crew were lost, and 240 were rescued or managed to reach Spain.

== Bibliography ==
- Ando, Elio (1978). "The Italian Navigatori Class, 1928". In Preston, Antony (ed.). Super Destroyers. Warship Special. Vol. 2. London: Conway Maritime Press. ISBN 0-85177-131-9.
- Bogart, Charles H.; Canadiani, Guido; Caruana, Joseph & Greene, Jack (1988). "Question 3/87". Warship International. XXV (2): 202–205. ISSN 0043-0374.
- Brescia, Maurizio (2012). Mussolini's Navy: A Reference Guide to the Regina Marina 1930–45. Annapolis, Maryland: Naval Institute Press. ISBN 978-1-59114-544-8.
- Fraccaroli, Aldo (1968). Italian Warships of World War II. Shepperton, UK: Ian Allan. ISBN 0-7110-0002-6.
- Roberts, John (1980). "Italy". In Chesneau, Roger (ed.). Conway's All the World's Fighting Ships 1922–1946. New York: Mayflower Books. pp. 280–317. ISBN 0-8317-0303-2.
- Rohwer, Jürgen (2005). Chronology of the War at Sea 1939–1945: The Naval History of World War Two (Third Revised ed.). Annapolis, Maryland: Naval Institute Press. ISBN 1-59114-119-2.
- Whitley, M. J. (1988). Destroyers of World War 2: An International Encyclopedia. Annapolis, Maryland: Naval Institute Press. ISBN 1-85409-521-8.
