= Leon Pancaldo =

Genoese explorer

Leon or Leone Pancaldo (1481, 1488 or 1490 – 1538) was a Genoese explorer.

Pancaldo was born in Savona, but appears to have grown up in both Spain and Portugal. His father, a wool merchant. Leon met Diego Colon, and transacted business with a trip to Hispañola in 1514.

He participated in the first circumnavigation of the globe led by Ferdinand Magellan; enrolling as a mariner in the ship of Trinidad and supposedly earning 1200 maravedis per month. He was captured by the Portuguese at the island of Ternate in the Moluccas. Transferred to the Portuguese trading posts of Malacca and Cochin; he had spent over a year, without being allowed to leave, until, along with a previous companion from the Magellan trip, Bautista de Poncero, he joined the crew of a ship named Santa Catalina traveling to Mozambique. There the two Spanish sailors were again imprisoned, and set to be sent to India, but Pancaldo was able to sequester himself aboard a ship travelling to Portugal. Aboard this ship, when he was discovered, he indicated his purpose was to die among his fellow-Christians. Nearly again imprisoned, he was released by order of the King and made his way into Spain by 1527. He claimed his journals, written in Italian, had been confiscated by the Portuguese. He appears to have been called to Valladolid as a witness, and part of the discussions between Spain and Portugal about the ownership of the Spice Islands that led to the Treaty of Zaragoza in 1529. In 1531, he was invited to Paris to discuss possible services as a guide to travel to the Spice islands. But Gaspar Palha, one of the diplomatic agents of the King John III of Portugal, was able to pay Pancaldo and induce him not to provide information to other parties.

In 1534-1535 he attempted another voyage, commissioned by both Spanish and Italian merchants from Valencia and Genoa, and employing 60 sailors aboard the ship of Santa Maria, that had been used by Sebastian Cabot for a 1526 trip to the River Plate. The trip aimed to traverse the Strait of Magellan and attempt to sell, at a hefty profit, merchandise, including silk, brocade, linen, rope, wine, and oil to the Spanish colonists flooding Peru after the conquest by Francisco Pizarro. They failed to traverse the strait, and instead returned to the River Plate, where they aimed to contact the settlement made by Pedro de Mendoza. This proved difficult, and only the arrival of the Santa Catalina, piloted by Antonio Lopez de Aguiar allowed them to reach the incipient settlement which would become Buenos Aires. They were able to sell their products, albeit on credit. Lopez de Aguiar would sue Pancaldo and some of his companions for 400 gold ducats as a reward for the hospitality, food and succor he had provided to the crew of the Santa Maria. He stayed in the settlement for over a year, and in 1538 he died at the River Plate in South America, possibly following conflicts with indigenous people.

== Commemoration ==
- The main tower in Savona and a street there are named after him.
- The World War 2 Italian Navigatori class destroyer Leone Pancaldo was named in his honor.
