= Luca Tarigo =

Luca Tarigo was a Genoese explorer and merchant based in Caffa in the Crimea during the 14th century. In 1347 he travelled up the rivers Don and Volga into the Caspian Sea.

The Italian Navigatori class destroyer Luca Tarigo, which was sunk in the Battle of the Tarigo Convoy in World War II was named after him.
