= HMS Unbending =

Submarine of the Royal Navy

History

United Kingdom
- Name: HMS Unbending
- Builder: Vickers-Armstrongs, Barrow-in-Furness
- Laid down: 30 August 1940
- Launched: 12 May 1941
- Commissioned: 5 November 1941
- Fate: Scrapped May 1950
- Badge

General characteristics
- Class & type: U-class submarine
- Displacement: Surfaced - 540 tons standard, 630 tons full load; Submerged - 730 tons
- Length: 58.22 m (191 ft)
- Beam: 4.90 m (16 ft 1 in)
- Draught: 4.62 m (15 ft 2 in)
- Propulsion: 2 shaft diesel-electric; 2 Paxman Ricardo diesel generators + electric motors; 615 / 825 hp
- Speed: 11.25 knots max surfaced; 10 knots max submerged
- Complement: 27-31
- Armament: 4 bow internal 21 inch (533 mm) torpedo tubes - 8 - 10 torpedoes; 1 - 3-inch (76 mm) gun

HMS Unbending (P37) was a Royal Navy U-class submarine built by Vickers-Armstrongs at Barrow-in-Furness, and part of the third group of that class. So far she has been the only ship of the Royal Navy to bear the name Unbending.

== Career ==
Unbending served in the Royal Navy's Tenth Flotilla under the command of Lieutenant E.T. Stanley. The ship spent most of her wartime career in the Mediterranean, where she sank the Italian merchant ships Alga, Citta di Bergamo, Cosenza and Beppe, the Italian auxiliary minelayer Eritrea and the Italian destroyer Giovanni da Verrazzano. She also sank the Italian ship Lupa II with gunfire. Unbending had first fired two torpedoes but these were evaded. Unbending also damaged the Italian passenger / cargo ship Viminale, the Italian merchant Carlo Margottini (the former Yugoslavian Bled), and the Italian passenger ship Carlo Margottini. This ship ran ashore and is not listed as a war loss so was most likely salvaged and returned to service.

Unbending was the initiator of one of the rare modern-day boarding parties: having surfaced beside a schooner in the gulf of Sfax, Unbending found herself unable to hit the small ship with her deck gun, so a resourceful officer leapt aboard and set fire to the entire ship using only a can of shale oil.

Unbending was sold to be broken up for scrap on 23 December 1949 and scrapped at Gateshead in May 1950.
