= Apuania =

Former comune of the Kingdom of Italy

- comune
- Comune di Apuania
- Coat of arms
- Motto: Ex tribus una
- Location within Italy Location within Tuscany
- Country: Italy
- Region: Tuscany
- Province: Apuania
- Existed: 16 December 1938 – 1 March 1946
- Time zone: UTC+1 (CET)
  - Summer (DST): UTC+2 (CEST)

Apuania was a short-lived comune of the Kingdom of Italy, created in 1938 under the Fascist regime by merging the Tuscan comuni of Massa, Carrara and Montignoso. The province of Massa-Carrara was accordingly renamed province of Apuania. Among the main supporters of this unified municipality were the Fascist leaders Renato Ricci, from Carrara, and Osvaldo Sebastiani, from Massa. The comune of Apuania had an area of 181 square kilometres and population of 106,378 inhabitants (59,031 in Carrara, 41,819 in Massa, 5,528 in Montignoso), over half of the overall population of 204,377 in the province. Its motto was Ex tribus una (Latin: "From three, one"), and the administrative seat was in Carrara, the largest of the three towns. It was dissolved in 1946, after which Massa, Carrara and Montignoso returned to their previous status as separate comuni.
