= Italian destroyer Antonio da Noli =

1931–1943 ship

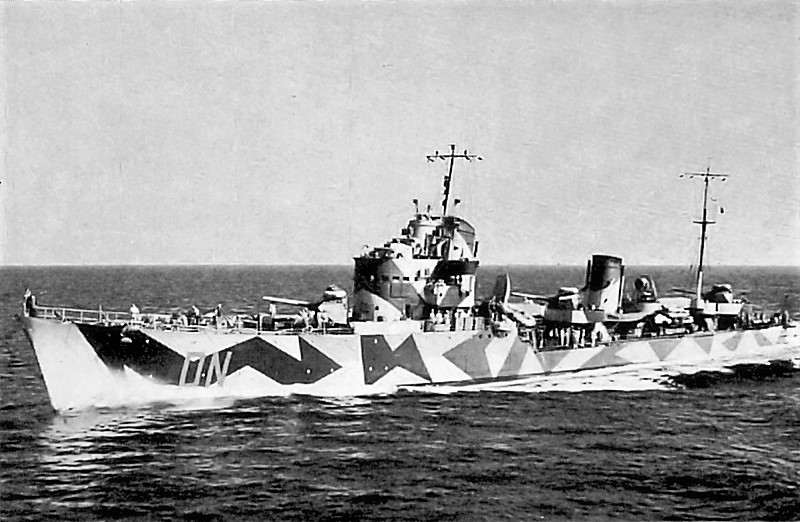
- Antonio da Noli underway, 13 September 1942

History

Kingdom of Italy
- Name: Antonio da Noli
- Namesake: Antonio da Noli
- Builder: Cantieri del Tirreno, Riva Trigoso
- Laid down: 25 July 1927
- Launched: 21 May 1929
- Completed: 15 March 1931
- Fate: Sunk by mine, 9 September 1943

General characteristics (as built)
- Class & type: Navigatori-class destroyer
- Displacement: 1,900 long tons (1,930 t) (standard); 2,580 long tons (2,621 t) (full load)
- Length: 107.3 m (352 ft)
- Beam: 10.2 m (33 ft 6 in)
- Draught: 3.5 m (11 ft 6 in)
- Installed power: 4 water-tube boilers; 55,000 hp (41,000 kW)
- Propulsion: 2 shafts; 2 geared steam turbines
- Speed: 32 knots (59.3 km/h; 36.8 mph)
- Range: 3,800 nmi (7,000 km; 4,400 mi) at 18 knots (33 km/h; 21 mph) (designed)
- Complement: 222–225 (wartime)
- Armament: 3 × twin 120 mm (4.7 in) guns; 2 × single 40 mm (1.6 in) AA guns; 4 × twin 13.2 mm (0.52 in) machine guns; 2 × triple 533 mm (21 in) torpedo tubes; 86–104 mines

Antonio da Noli was one of a dozen Navigatori-class destroyers built for the Regia Marina (Royal Italian Navy) in the late 1920s. Completed in 1931, she served in World War II.

== Design and description ==
The Navigatori-class destroyers were designed to counter the large French destroyers of the Jaguar and Guépard classes. They had an overall length of 107.3 meters (352 ft), a beam of 10.2 meters (33 ft 6 in) and a mean draft of 3.5 meters (11 ft 6 in). They displaced 1,900 metric tons (1,900 long tons) at standard load, and 2,580 metric tons (2,540 long tons) at deep load. Their complement during wartime was 222–225 officers and enlisted men.

The Navigatoris were powered by two Parsons geared steam turbines, each driving one propeller shaft using steam supplied by four Odero-Terni-Orlando water-tube boilers. The turbines were designed to produce 55,000 shaft horsepower (41,000 kW) and a speed of 32 knots (59 km/h; 37 mph) in service, although the ships reached speeds of 38–41 knots (70–76 km/h; 44–47 mph) during their sea trials while lightly loaded. They carried enough fuel oil to give them a range of 3,800 nautical miles (7,000 km; 4,400 mi) at a speed of 18 knots (33 km/h; 21 mph).

Their main battery consisted of six 120-millimeter (4.7 in) guns in three twin-gun turrets, one each fore and aft of the superstructure and the third amidships. Anti-aircraft (AA) defense for the Navigatori-class ships was provided by a pair of 40-millimeter (1.6 in) AA guns in single mounts abreast the forward funnel and a pair of twin-gun mounts for 13.2-millimeter (0.52 in) machine guns. They were equipped with six 533-millimeter (21 in) torpedo tubes in two triple mounts amidships. The Navigatoris could carry 86–104 mines.

== Construction and career ==
Antonio da Noli was laid down by Cantieri del Tirreno at their Riva Trigoso shipyard on 25 July 1927, launched on 21 May 1929 and commissioned on 29 December.

== Bibliography ==
- Ando, Elio (1978). "The Italian Navigatori Class, 1928". In Preston, Antony (ed.). Super Destroyers. Warship Special. Vol. 2. London: Conway Maritime Press. ISBN 0-85177-131-9.
- Bogart, Charles H.; Canadiani, Guido; Caruana, Joseph & Greene, Jack (1988). "Question 3/87". Warship International. XXV (2): 202–205. ISSN 0043-0374.
- Brescia, Maurizio (2012). Mussolini's Navy: A Reference Guide to the Regina Marina 1930–45. Annapolis, Maryland: Naval Institute Press. ISBN 978-1-59114-544-8.
- Fraccaroli, Aldo (1968). Italian Warships of World War II. Shepperton, UK: Ian Allan. ISBN 0-7110-0002-6.
- Roberts, John (1980). "Italy". In Chesneau, Roger (ed.). Conway's All the World's Fighting Ships 1922–1946. New York: Mayflower Books. pp. 280–317. ISBN 0-8317-0303-2.
- Rohwer, Jürgen (2005). Chronology of the War at Sea 1939–1945: The Naval History of World War Two (Third Revised ed.). Annapolis, Maryland: Naval Institute Press. ISBN 1-59114-119-2.
- Whitley, M. J. (1988). Destroyers of World War 2: An International Encyclopedia. Annapolis, Maryland: Naval Institute Press. ISBN 1-85409-521-8.
