= 3. Maj =

Croatian shipyard

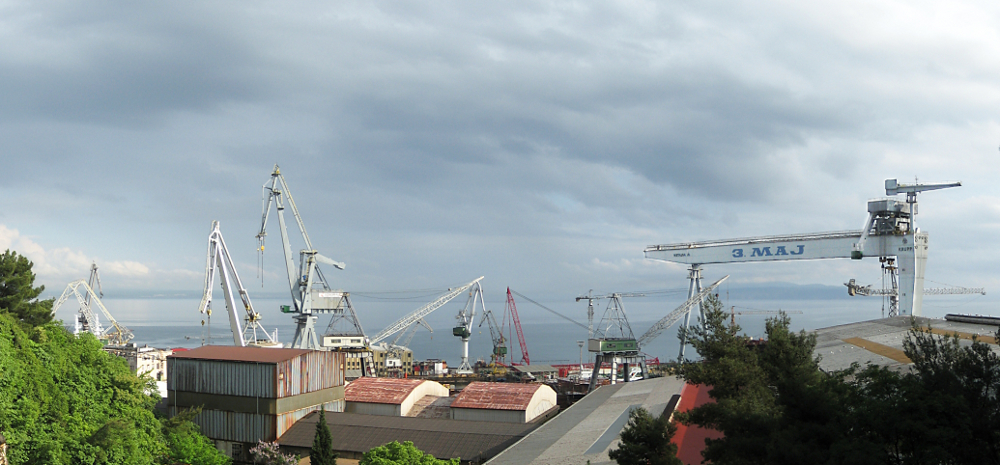
3. Maj shipyard

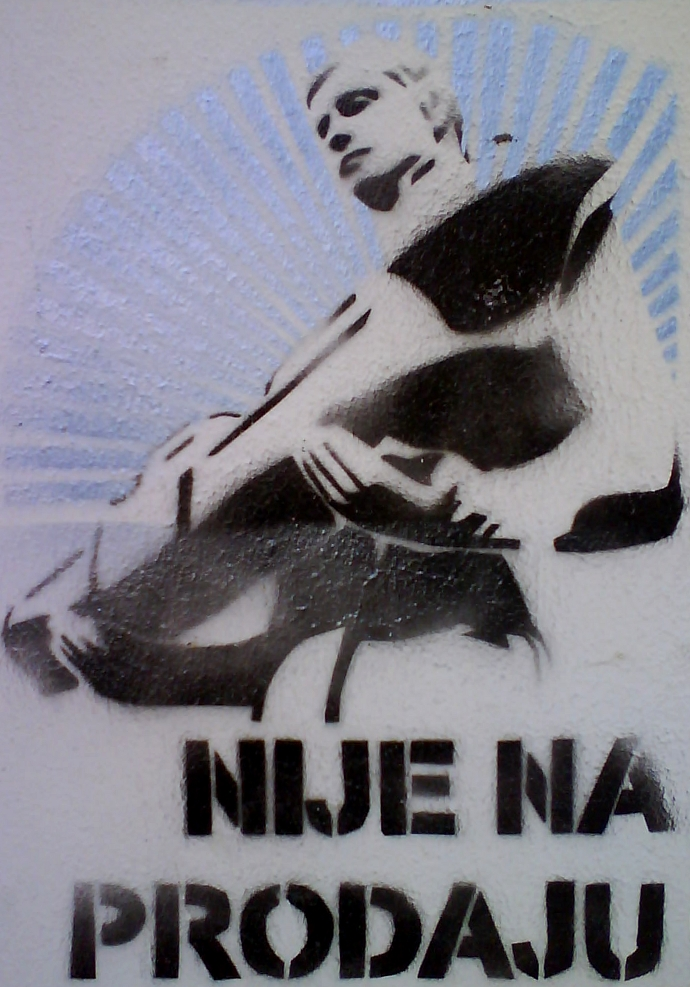
Croatian: "Nije na prodaju", lit. 'Not for sale' protest graffiti in post-privatisation Croatia

3. Maj (official name: Treći Maj Brodogradilište d.d.; lit. 'Third May Shipyard') is a Croatian shipyard, located in Rijeka. It builds mainly oil tankers, bulk cargo ships, and container ships. It also sometimes builds smaller passenger ferries or yachts. It employs approximately 2,850 workers, and is the largest shipyard in Croatia.

The first docks were erected in 1892 as an affiliate to the German Howaldtswerke from Kiel. After their rent expired in 1902, it had low activity until 1905 when three businessmen from Budapest resumed the operation, now under the name Danubius, renamed in 1911 to Ganz & co. Danubius.

Activity grew throughout the 1910s. As the largest shipyard in Hungary (Rijeka, known as Fiume at the time, was a corpus separatum directly belonging to the Kingdom of Hungary), many ships and warships were built here under the Hungarian shipbuilder Ganz-Danubius, including the largest ship/warship ever built by Hungary, the SMS Szent István. In 1920, with the establishment of the Free State of Fiume, it passed to Italian possession, and the name was changed once again, to Cantieri Navali Quarnero.

During World War II, the shipyard was destroyed, and had to be rebuilt. After the war, it went under the name Kvarnersko Brodogradilište, and in 1948 it was renamed 3. Maj ("3 May"), in memory of 3 May 1945 when Rijeka (then part of Italy and called Fiume) was freed from Axis occupation.

In 2013, 3. Maj was merged into Uljanik shipbuilding company.

== See also ==
- List of companies of the Socialist Federal Republic of Yugoslavia
