= Antony Preston =

English naval historian

- Born: Antony Martin Douglas Leslie William Calhoun Preston; 26 February 1938; Salford, Lancashire
- Died: 25 December 2004 (aged 66); Battersea, London
- Resting place: Mortlake, London
- Education: King Edward VII School, Johannesburg; University of Witwatersrand
- Occupations: Naval historian, editor, journalist and author
- Spouse: Jennifer Preston
- Children: 4
- Writing career
- Genre: Naval History

Antony Martin Douglas Leslie William Calhoun Preston (26 February 1938 – 25 December 2004) was an English naval historian and editor, specialising in the area of 19th and 20th-century naval history and warship design.

== Life ==
Antony Preston was born in 1938 in Salford, Lancashire, son of the 16th Viscount Gormanston and Miss Julia O'Mahony. After becoming a wartime evacuee, he was educated in South Africa at King Edward VII School, Johannesburg, and the University of Witwatersrand. On his return to England he spent some years at the National Maritime Museum, Greenwich, before becoming Editor of the periodical Defence.

During the 1970s he was employed by a specialist publisher, Conway Maritime Press, as editor of their Warship annual. He also produced the specialised newsletter Navint. In the early nineties, he took over as chief editor of the magazine Naval Forces at the German editorial group Mönch.

He left to resume as editor of Warships in 1996. Antony Preston lived in London until his death in 2004. His son Matt Preston (born 1961 and the eldest of Preston's four children) has gained celebrity as a TV judge on MasterChef Australia and as a restaurant critic-columnist for the Melbourne The Age and Herald Sun newspapers.

== Bibliography ==
Only the four most recent Warship annuals are listed; other titles are listed in reverse order of publication.

- Send a Gunboat: The Victorian Navy and Supremacy at Sea, 1854–1904 2007 with Eric J. Grove and John Major
- Warship 2005 (Ed). Conway Maritime Press (15 July 2005). ISBN 1-84486-003-5
- Warship 2004 (Ed). Conway Maritime Press. (July, 2004). ISBN 0-85177-948-4
- Warship 2002–2003 (Ed). Conway Maritime Press. (Dec, 2002). ISBN 0-85177-901-8
- Warship 2001–2002 (Ed). Conway Maritime Press. (April, 2002). ISBN 0-85177-926-3
- The World's Great Submarines: From the Civil War to the Present Day (2005)
- Send a Gunboat! (with John Major). Chrysalis Books (28 February 2003). ISBN 0-85177-923-9
- The World's Worst Warships. Conway Maritime Press (2002). ISBN 0-85177-754-6
- The Royal Navy Submarine Service: A Centennial History. Conway Maritime Press (November 2001). ISBN 0-85177-891-7
- The World's Great Aircraft Carriers: From the Civil War to the Present. Thunder Bay Press (CA) (July 2000). ISBN 1-57145-261-3
- Submarine Warfare: An Illustrated History. Thunder Bay Press (CA) (April 1999). ISBN 1-57145-172-2
- An illustrated history of the navies of World War II (with John Batchelor), Military Book Club (1 January 1998). ASIN B0006R987I, also Bison (1976). ISBN 0-86124-071-5
- Aircraft Carriers: An Illustrated History. PRC Publishing Ltd. (1997). ASIN B000CORWY6
- Pictorial History of South Africa. Gallery Books (Aug 1989). ISBN 0-8317-6905-X
- Jane's Fighting Ships of World War II, Tiger Books (1989). ISBN 978-1-85501-994-2
- Fighting Ships, Bison (1989). ISBN 0-86124-495-8
- Berühmte Kriegsschiffe - 1914 bis heute, Motorbuch Verlag Stuttgart, 1988. ISBN 3-613-01218-9
- (with Richard Natkiel) Weidenfeld Atlas of Maritime History. Weidenfeld & Nicolson (May 1986). ISBN 0-297-78653-9
- Carriers (Modern Military Techniques), Armada (1986). ISBN 978-0-583-31003-1
- History of the Royal Navy, W.H. Smith (1985). ISBN 978-0-86124-121-7
- Armed Forces of the World (with Charles Messenger and Anthony Robinson), Gallery Books (1985). ISBN 978-0-8317-0403-2
- Flower Class Corvettes (Man O' War), Arms and Armour Press (1982). ISBN 978-0-85368-559-3
- Strike Craft, Bison (1982). ISBN 0-86124-068-5
- Submarines, Bison (1982). ISBN 0-86124-066-9
- Aircraft Carriers, Bison (1982). ISBN 0-86124-067-7
- Battleships, Bison (1982). ISBN 0-86124-063-4
- Destroyers, Bison (1982). ISBN 0-86124-065-0
- Battleships (Warships). Lifetime Books (August 1982). ISBN 0-8119-0462-8
- Cruisers (Warships). Lifetime Books (August 1982). ISBN 0-8119-0465-2
- Sea combat off the Falklands. Willow Books (1982). ISBN 0-00-218046-4
- Warships of the World, Jane's Information Group (1980). ISBN 978-0-7106-0020-2
- Fighting Ships of the World, Phoebus (1980). ISBN 978-0-7026-0067-8
- Sea Power: A Modern Illustrated Military History (with Louis S Casey & John Batchelor). Phoebus/Exeter Books (14 September 1979). ISBN 0-70260-046-6, 0-89673-011-5
- Decisive Battles of the Pacific Wars. Book Sales (May 1980). ISBN 0-89009-293-1
- Dreadnought to nuclear submarine (The ship). HMSO/National Maritime Museum (1980). ISBN 0-11-290319-3
- U-Boats, E.P. Dutton & Co Inc (1978). ASIN B0011WGKMS
- Battleships, 1856–1919 (with John Batchelor), Phoebus (1977). ISBN 0-72710-183-8
- Battleships, 1919–1977 (with John Batchelor), Phoebus (1977). OCLC 16502359
- Battleships, 1856–1977 (with John Batchelor), Chartwell/Phoebus (1977). ISBN 0-89009-126-9, 0-89608-188-5
- Submarines Since 1919 (with John Batchelor), BPC Publishing Ltd (1974). ASIN B0007ALBJM
- Battleships of World War I, Stackpole (1972). ISBN 978-0-8117-0211-9
- V and W Class Destroyers, 1919–1945, Macdonald (1971). ISBN 978-0-356-03471-3
- (Editor) Super Destroyers: The Big Destroyers built in the 1930s (Warship Special), Conway Maritime Press (1978). ISBN 978-0-85177-131-1
- (Editor) Decisive Battles of Hitler's War, Chartwell Books (1977). ISBN 978-0-89009-091-6
- (contributor) Navies of the American Revolution (with David Lyon and John Batchelor). Leo Cooper/Prentice-Hall (April 1975). ISBN 0-85052-191-2, 0-13610-774-5
- (contributor) Navies of World War 3. BISON BOOKS (1986). ISBN 0-86124-114-2
