= Italian World War II destroyers =

The Italian destroyers of World War II comprised a mix of old warship designs dating from World War I and some of the most modern of their type in the world. These destroyers (Italian: cacciatorpediniere) also varied in size from enlarged torpedo-boats to esploratori (an Italian designation for large destroyers approaching light cruiser size).

During the war, Italian destroyers were responsible for the safe flow of convoys to supply the Axis armies in North Africa and for the suppression of British submarines.

71 Italian destroyers served during World War II (including those captured from Yugoslavia and France). 43 of these were sunk during the war against the Allies. After Italy surrendered to the Allies, a further 15 destroyers were sunk by the Germans or scuttled to prevent capture. 13 destroyers survived the war, most of which were ceded to France and the Soviet Union. 5 were retained by the postwar Marina Militare.

== Design evolution ==
The operational areas for the Regia Marina (Royal Italian Navy) were expected to be enclosed seas such as the Mediterranean, Red Sea and the Gulf of Aden. This was reflected in the design and construction of its warships, which did not need to withstand open ocean conditions. In 1941, the appropriately named Scirocco foundered in a storm off Cape Spartivento.

Italian destroyer designs followed differing design paths. At one end, a torpedo boat design was developed into a series of destroyer classes (Sella, Sauro and Turbine) that were comparable with their British contemporaries. There were also large destroyers of the older Mirabello and Leone classes, which were reserved for less-dangerous tasks. The large destroyer concept had been revived in the mid-1920s, in response to new French designs.

At the end of the 1920s, a design emerged (Freccia class) that was the basis for improvement and standardisation. Subsequent classes showed incremental changes that improved reliability and the Maestrales were the template for the following twenty-three ships.

The original anti-aircraft weaponry, consisting of mixtures of obsolete 40-millimetre Vickers cannon (designed in 1917) and 13.2 mm machine guns was clearly inadequate when Italy entered World War II. The chosen answer was 20-millimetre cannon and, in some individual ships, 37-millimetre guns replaced torpedo tubes.

The maximum speeds of Italian warships of this period should be viewed with caution, since Italian practice was to run the trials with ships as light as possible, often without armament. This enabled impressive speeds which were unobtainable under operational conditions.

=== Esploratori ===
The designation esploratori, meaning "scouts", was originally given to a class of Italian warship that was between the then-current destroyers and cruisers, in terms of size and firepower. Of the Italian destroyers that saw action in World War II, the ships belonging to the Navigatori, Mirabello and Leone classes were originally rated as esploratori. They were reclassified as destroyers by 1940. The Regia Marina initially classified yet another group of ships (Capitani Romani class) as esploratori oceanici—ocean scouts—but they were later reclassified as light cruisers.

== Active service during World War II ==
Italian destroyers were usually organised into Squadriglie (Destroyer Squadrons or Divisions) of four ships of one class. When Italy entered World War II, on 10 June 1940, the Regia Marina had sixteen Squadriglie Cacciatorpediniere. Destroyer Divisions 1 and 2 were each composed of four Turbine-class destroyers, Destroyer Division 3 (stationed in the Red Sea) consisted of the four Sauro-class destroyers, Destroyer Division 4 consisted of the two remaining Sella-class destroyers, Destroyer Division 5 (stationed in the Red Sea) was made of the three Leone-class destroyers, Destroyer Division 6 consisted of the two Mirabello-class destroyers, Destroyer Divisions 7, 8, 9 and 10 consisted of four ships each from the Freccia (Division 7), Folgore (Division 8), Oriani (Division 9) and Maestrale (Division 10) classes, respectively; Destroyer Divisions 11, 12 and 13 were composed of four Soldati-class destroyers each, and Destroyer Divisions 14, 15 and 16 were made of four Navigatori-class destroyers each.

During the war, the older destroyers (such as the WWI-era Mirabello-class and the Sella-class, built in the early 1920s) were mainly used as escort ships on the less-dangerous routes (mainly between Italy, Albania, Greece, the Italian Dodecanese and the Axis-occupied islands in the Aegean Sea), whereas the more modern destroyers of the Oriani and Soldati classes were primarily employed as fleet escorts, but not exclusively so, taking part in most battles and operations that involved the Italian battle fleet between 1940 and 1942. Other tasks included mine-laying, convoy escort, anti-submarine, supply transport and anti-shipping. Destroyers that fell between the two categories, being neither too obsolete, nor modern enough for use with the battle fleet, were tasked with escorting supply convoys between Italy and North Africa; ships of the Navigatori, Freccia, Folgore and Maestrale classes were among those that saw most-intense service on these routes. As losses among the less-recent destroyers mounted, modern ones were increasingly used for convoy escort as well, and by late 1942 the majority of the Oriani and Soldati-class ships were also being primarily used for escort, transport and minelaying duties in the Sicilian Channel, leaving few destroyers with the battle fleet.

During the Tunisian Campaign, after the Battle of Skerki Bank caused the loss of 1,500 soldiers in one night and showed that troop transports were too vulnerable to the Allied offensive, Italian destroyers were extensively used in fast troop-transport missions to Tunisia. Sailing from ports in Sicily, a destroyer division could deliver some 1,200 troops with their personal equipment in one night; of 77,741 troops sent to Tunisia by sea between November 1942 and May 1943, some 52,000 were carried by the destroyers, with the loss of less than 700 men (compared to nearly 5,000 troops lost at sea while being carried by merchant ships). At the same time, Italian destroyers were deeply involved in escort missions of supply convoys and minelaying missions aimed at defending the main shipping lanes between Italy and Tunisia; during the Tunisian campaign, Italian destroyers carried out 535 escort missions, 301 transport missions and 132 minelaying missions (laying 4,093 mines overall).

At the outbreak of World War II, the Italian Navy had 59 destroyers (not including 67 "torpedo boats" that were either downrated WWI-era small destroyers, such as the Pilo, Sirtori, La Masa, Palestro and Curtatone classes, or ships of the Spica and Orsa classes, comparable in size, armament and use to the Allied destroyer escorts). Twelve additional destroyers were commissioned during the war: five were newly built ships of the Soldati class and seven were captured foreign ships, of which three were Yugoslav ships captured in April 1941 with the Invasion of Yugoslavia, and four were French ships raised and repaired after the scuttling of the French fleet in Toulon in November 1942. The intense service of these ships, especially on the dangerous supply routes between Italy and North Africa, resulted in severe losses: of seventy-one Italian destroyers that served during World War II, forty-three were sunk during the war against the Allies, between 10 June 1940 and 8 September 1943, and another fifteen were lost following the Armistice of Cassibile and Operation Achse (most of the latter were undergoing maintenance or repairs when the armistice was declared, and were scuttled in harbour to prevent them from falling into German hands). Most of the thirteen destroyers that survived the war were ceded to France and the Soviet Union by order of the Paris Peace Treaty; only five destroyers (the WWI-era Augusto Riboty, the Navigatori-class Nicoloso Da Recco and the more modern Grecale, Granatiere and Carabiniere) were left to the postwar Marina Militare.

Of the fifty-eight Italian destroyers lost during World War II, fourteen were sunk by aircraft, ten by surface warships, eight by submarines, six by mines, five by accidental causes, and one by motor torpedo boats. Eight were scuttled and six captured, most of them in harbour while undergoing repairs, following the Italian armistice and the German occupation of Italy.

== Classes ==
At the Italian declaration of war in June 1940, the Regia Marina's destroyer force was a mix of outdated ships of World War I design and larger numbers of modern designs.

=== Mirabello class ===
Three Mirabello class destroyers were commissioned in 1916–1917 as esploratori, but one (Carlo Alberto Racchia) was lost in the Black Sea in 1920. The ships of this class were powerful destroyers in the early 1920s, displacing 2,300 tons and armed with eight four-inch guns in single mounts, 450-millimetre (17.7 in) torpedoes, depth charges and mines. Four of the eight guns were mounted along the ships' sides, reducing a broadside to six.

The Mirabellos reflected their age when Italy entered the war, and were used to lay minefields off Taranto and to escort convoys to Albania and Greece, relatively "safe" duties. Despite this, Carlo Mirabello was mined and sank off the Greek coast near Cape Dukato in 1941. During 1942–43, the remaining ship, Augusto Ributy, was rearmed to escort convoyes, removing its four beam four-inch guns and strengthening its anti-aircraft weaponry to eight 20-millimetre machine guns while increasing depth charge capacity. She survived the war and, though assigned to the Soviet Union by the peace treaty, she was refused due to her old age and was scrapped in 1951.

=== Leone class ===
Three Leone class "esploratori" were commissioned in 1924, and were reclassified as destroyers in 1938. Their armament was upgraded from that of the preceding Mirabellos and the resultant additional topweight required increases in dimensions and displacement (2,690 tonnes) with the machinery significantly uprated to maintain speed. Main guns and torpedoes were all located along the centre-line, an improvement that allowed all guns to fire to both sides, although two turrets were placed amidships and could only fire to either side. Eight 4.7-inch guns (120 mm – the new standard for Italian destroyers, introduced during World War I by the Romanian-ordered Aquila class) were mounted in four twin turrets and torpedo tubes were now 21 inch.

All three were part of the Italian Red Sea Flotilla when Italy entered the war in June 1940, where they were employed to lay mine fields and to disrupt British convoys, without any success. All were lost by early April 1941. Leone ran aground and was sunk by her sisters. After an abortive mission against Port Sudan, Pantera and Tigre, both damaged by Swordfish aircraft, were scuttled off Saudi Arabia.

=== Sella class ===
The four Sella class ships were enlarged Palestro class torpedo boats, commissioned in 1926 and 1927, displacing 1,500 tonnes. As completed, these ships had a single 120-millimetre (4.7 inch) gun, four 533-millimetre (21 inch) torpedo tubes, two 40 mm and two 13.2 mm machine guns. The single 120 mm gun mounting was changed to a twin in 1929 and an additional twin mount was installed sometime before 1942. The 40 mm weapons were an old pattern and they were replaced by two 20 mm. Two more 20 mm and two depth charge throwers were added. In use, the class proved to be unreliable.

Two of this class, Bettino Ricasoli and Giovanni Nicotera, were sold to Sweden and transferred just as Italy declared war. The remaining two were stationed in the Aegean for much of the war. They laid minefields and escorted convoys and were involved in actions against British operations off Rhodes and Crete. In the latter case they carried the explosive motorboats that seriously damaged HMS York at Suda Bay. At the Italian surrender in 1943, German E-Boats sank the Quintino Sella, while Francesco Crispi was captured in Piraeus and renamed TA15 for the Kriegsmarine, later sunk by Allied planes on 12 October 1944.

=== Sauro class ===
Four Sauro class destroyers were commissioned in 1926 and 1927. They were developments of the preceding Sella class, with a broader beam to allow for the greater weight of weaponry and some layout changes. The machinery remained substantially unchanged and, consequentially, the Sauros were no more reliable. They displaced 1,625 tonnes, with four 120 mm guns and six 533 mm torpedo tubes. Secondary armament, 40 mm and 13.2 mm machine guns were unchanged at the time of their early loss.

The four destroyers were based in the Red Sea to attack British convoys. All were lost by early April 1941, when Massawa fell: one (Francesco Nullo) was sunk by HMS Kimberley in October 1940 after a failed attack on a British convoy, while two (Nazario Sauro and Daniele Manin) were sunk by British planes during a last failed attack on Port Sudan, shortly before the fall of Massawa, and the last one (Cesare Battisti) had to be scuttled after engine defects forced her to abort the same mission.

=== Turbine class ===
Eight 1,700 tonne Turbine class destroyers were commissioned in 1927 and 1928. These ships were a further development of the Sella design, with a larger hull, significantly increased engine power and fuel storage. The result was slightly faster ships with greater range. Armament was unchanged but a greater mine capacity was available. After 1940, the two surviving ships had their old model 40 mm guns replaced by modern 10 mm ones. In addition, Turbine had one triple torpedo tube mounting replaced by a 37 mm gun.

All of the class were based at Tobruk, Italian Libya, and used to lay minefields and run supplies from Italy. This was an exposed location and six were sunk before the end of September 1940, most in harbour by naval aircraft. Two survived until the Italian surrender, one (Turbine) was captured by the Germans and renamed TA14. Euro joined the Allies and was subsequently sunk off Leros.

=== Navigatori class ===
The twelve Navigatori class destroyers were commissioned between December 1929 and May 1931. They were a modern form of the earlier esploratori, displacing 2,650 tonnes, and were a response to the French Jaguar and Guépard classes. Weaponry was reduced to six 120 mm guns in three twin turrets, one of which was amidships. The guns were a new model (Ansaldo 1926 pattern, 50 calibre) and the mountings allowed 45° elevation. The class used two sizes of torpedoes, in two triple banks, each unusually composed of two 533 mm (21 in) separated by one 450 mm (17.7 in) torpedo launcher. As originally built, the class retained the older anti-aircraft fit of two 40 mm and four 13.2 mm machine guns. Fifty-six mines were carried, except for the flagship, Nicolosso Da Recco, which required space for staff facilities. The class's machinery introduced a unit design, whereby the boilers and engine for one shaft were housed separately from those for the other shaft. Power output was substantially increased in order to deliver the desired speed. A new style of bridge layout and structure was also introduced.

As originally built, the Navigatori ships were insufficiently stable and too wet. Remedies were applied in two stages, firstly in the mid-1930s when some superficial changes were made to reduce superstructures and move fuel bunkers, and subsequently from 1938 to 1940, when the beam was increased and bows raised. This increased displacement and significantly reduced speed. During World War II, several programmes were started to upgrade weaponry, in particular anti-aircraft weapons, but none were applied uniformly to all ships in the class. These included full triple 533 mm torpedo mountings, 40 mm guns replaced by greater numbers of 20 mm guns, and replacement of the after torpedo tubes with 37 mm guns. Several ships were adapted for radar but only two received the equipment; Leone Pancaldo had the Italian EC3/ter Gufo set and Lanzaretto Malocello had the German FuMo 26/40G.

The three squadrons of this class served in the Mediterranean, escorting North African convoys, laying offensive minefields, bombarding shore targets and screening the fleet. Five ships survived until the Italian surrender, but two of these were sunk in September 1943 after action against a German convoy and another was scuttled in port to avoid capture by the Germans. One was captured by the Germans and served with them as TA44. One ship survived the war in Italian service.

=== Freccia or Dardo class ===
The four Freccia destroyers, commissioned between October 1931 and May 1932, were a reversion to the smaller type of fleet destroyer and were intended to keep pace with the new Zara-class cruisers. Achieving such speeds required greater engine power. Despite their design origins with the Turbine class, various changes resulted in the displacement, as originally built, increasing to 2,150 tonnes. These changes included a larger hull, remodelled bridge, and engine exhausts trunked to a single funnel. Poor stability and engine reliability were serious problems when the ships entered service and remedies were attempted which, in turn, led to fuel contamination. Weaponry was the same as the Turbines, except that an improved version of the 120 mm gun was installed (Ansaldo 1926 pattern). Later, the obsolete 40 mm and 13.2 mm machine guns were replaced by 20 mm (65 calibre) machine guns. In one ship, a torpedo mounting was replaced by two 37 mm guns.

At Italy entered the war, the four ships formed the 7th Squadron based at Taranto and they were at the Battle of Calabria. Otherwise, their main role was convoy protection. Three were lost before the Italian surrender and one, Dardo, was captured by the Germans (renamed TA31).

Four ships, the Kountouriotis-class destroyer, were built for the Greek Navy, based on the Freccia design.

=== Folgore class ===
The four Folgore class destroyers, commissioned between June and September 1932, were modified Freccias and are sometimes included in that class as the "second group". Displacement was marginally reduced at 2,130 tonnes. The one major alteration was to reduce beam in order to improve their speed, which resulted in reduced fuel capacity and range. They were no more reliable or seaworthy than the Freccias. Their anti-aircraft gunnery was similarly improved.

These ships' service was closely similar to the Freccias. They were based at Taranto and also took part in the Battle of Calabria. They also spent much of their time escorting North African convoys, on which duties they were all lost before the Italian surrender.

=== Maestrale class ===
Development of the Maestrale class destroyers was a largely successful attempt to eliminate faults of the Dardo and Folgore classes. The four ships, commissioned from September to November 1934, were larger at 2,255 tonnes, longer and broader. Engines and armament, as completed, were unchanged from the Dardos, but a later version of the 120 mm gun was used, the O.T.O. Pattern 1931. During service, efforts were made to improve the potency of the anti-aircraft weaponry; 40 mm and 13.2 mm machine guns were replaced by newer 20 mm ones and subsequently increased in number, and two 37 mm anti-aircraft guns were installed in place of a torpedo-tube mounting. A 120 mm starshell gun was installed on some ships to mitigate the Italian Navy's disadvantages in night actions.

Although mainly used as fleet escorts, these ships also laid minefields and escorted convoys. During one such duty, they missed the Battle of Calabria and were never involved in a major fleet action. Two were lost before the Italian surrender: one torpedoed and one lost in a storm. Another, under repair at the surrender, was scuttled to avoid German capture. The fourth, Grecale, joined the Allies and was involved in actions against the Germans and survived into post-war Italian service.

=== Oriani or Poeti class ===
The four Oriani class destroyers were commissioned between July and December 1937. They were effectively Maestrales with increased engine power, which provided only a marginal speed improvement. The obsolete 40 mm anti-aircraft guns were discontinued and replaced by extra 13.2 mm machine guns; otherwise armament was unchanged. The ships displaced 2,510 tonnes as built. Significant upgrades were made to the weapons systems of the two ships which survived the Battle of Cape Matapan, similar to those made to the Maestrales. One torpedo-tube mounting was replaced by two 37 mm guns; 20 mm cannon, a 120 mm star-shell gun and depth charge throwers were also installed. Before the end of the war, one ship, Oriani, had German Seetakt radar and additional 20 mm cannon.

The four Orianis operated as fleet escorts for much of the war, being present at the battles of Calabria and Matapan, two being sunk at the latter action. Another was sunk shortly before the Italian surrender. One ship, Oriani, survived to serve with the Allies and was subsequently transferred to France and renamed D'Estaing.

=== Soldati class ===
Nineteen Soldati class destroyers were built in two batches: twelve commissioned between August 1938 and May 1939, and five between February and August 1942. The remaining two ships were not completed before the surrender; one was scrapped while under construction and the final one was completed under German colours.

==== First group ====
The first batch took the Oriani design, with some modifications giving an increased displacement of 1,645 tonnes. Weapons systems were modified but these were not consistent between all ships of the class. The 120 mm guns remained the main battery, in two twin mountings, fore and aft, but a later pattern was used, the 1936 or 1937 Ansaldo. As completed, the anti-aircraft battery consisted of twelve machine guns. Five ships are known to have had a second fire-control director installed aft; two ships are known not have been so fitted. All except Carabiniere had a 120 mm star shell gun amidships. All ships had two triple 21-inch torpedo-tube mountings.

In 1940–1941, the second fire-control directors were removed from those ships that had them. Five ships had an additional single 120 mm gun (Ansaldo 1940 pattern) installed to replace their star-shell gun. The anti-aircraft machine-guns were replaced by 20 mm cannon and further strengthened in 1943. Three ships received two single 37 mm anti-aircraft guns, which replaced the single 120 mm (where installed) and the aft torpedo-tube mountings. One ship, Fuciliere, had an Italian Gufo radar set installed in 1943.

==== Second group ====
Seven modified Soldati-class ships were ordered in 1940 and laid down from late 1940 to 1941. These ships were equipped with five 120 mm guns (2 twin and one single replacing the star-shell gun of the earlier ships) and additional light AA guns.

=== Comandanti Medaglie d'Oro class ===
None of the Comandanti Medaglie d'Oro class were ever launched. Twenty were ordered for the Regia Marina and nine were laid down.

=== Captured ships ===
The Regia Marina also operated some destroyers built for foreign navies, captured from either France or Yugoslavia.

- Premuda – former Yugoslav destroyer Dubrovnik captured in April 1941
- Beograd class – 2 former Yugoslav destroyers captured in April 1941
- FR 22 – former French destroyer of the Chacal class captured in November 1942
- Guépard class – 2 former French destroyers captured in November 1942, FR 21 and FR 24
- FR 31 – former French destroyer of the Bourrasque class captured in November 1942

== Weapons systems ==
=== Guns ===
- 4 inch (Mirabello)
- 120 millimetre (4.7 in) M1918/19 Pattern (Leone)
- 120 millimetre (4.7 in) O.T.O. 1926 Pattern (Sella, Sauro, Turbine)
- 120 millimetre (4.7 in), 50 calibre Ansaldo 1926 Pattern (Navigatore, Freccia, Folgore)
- 120 millimetre (4.7 in), 50 calibre O.T.O. 1931 Pattern (Maestrale)
- 120 millimetre (4.7 in), 1936 & 1937 Patterns (Soldati, 1st group)
- 120 millimetre (4.7 in), 50 calibre Ansaldo 1940 Pattern (some Soldati, 1st group)
- 120 millimetre (4.7 in), 15 calibre star-shell gun
- Vickers 40 millimetre, 39 calibre (original fit for most classes, steadily replaced by 20mm/65 calibre)
- Breda 37 millimetre, 54 calibre (Turbine, individual ships of Freccia, Folgore, Maestrale, Oriani, some Soldati)
- Breda Model 35 20-millimetre, 65 calibre (Navigatori, Soldati)
- Scotte-Isotta 20 millimetre, 70 calibre (Oriani, Soldati(?))
- Breda Model 1931 13.2 mm machine guns

=== Torpedoes ===
- 450 millimetres (17.7 in) (Navigatori)
- 533 millimetres (21 in) (Navigatori, Soldati)

=== Radar ===
- EC3/ter Gufo
- FuMo 26/40G
- Seetakt

== Gallery ==
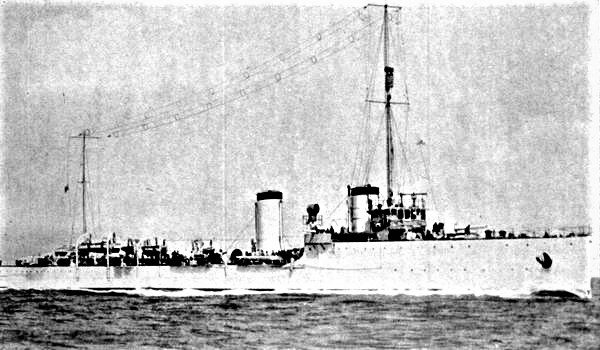
Mirabello class

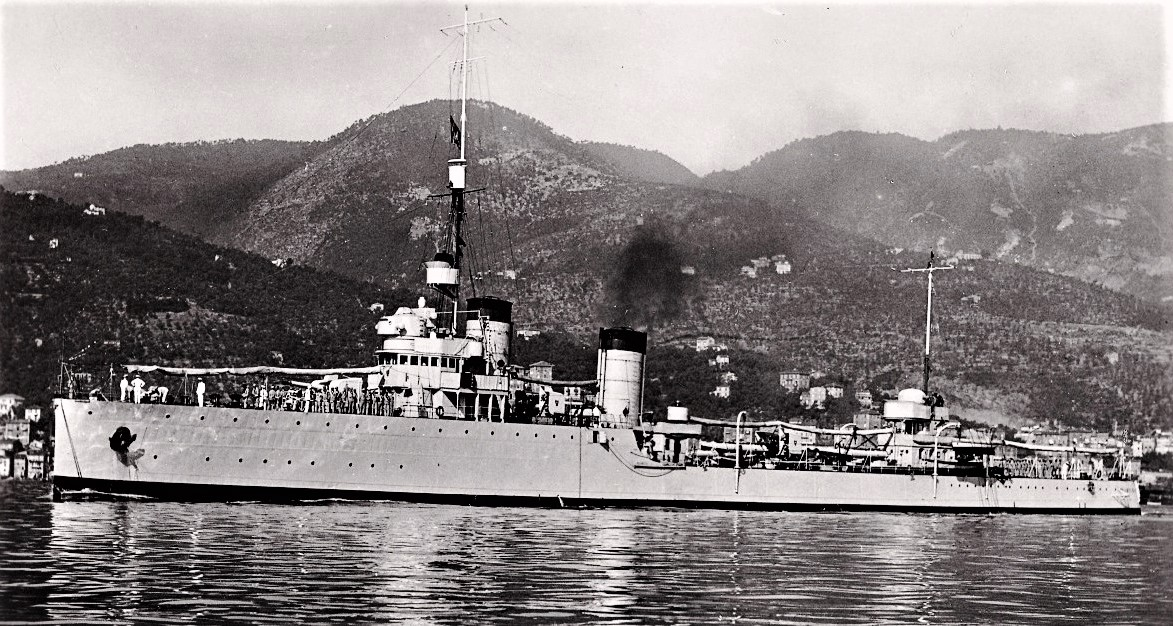
Leone class

Sella class

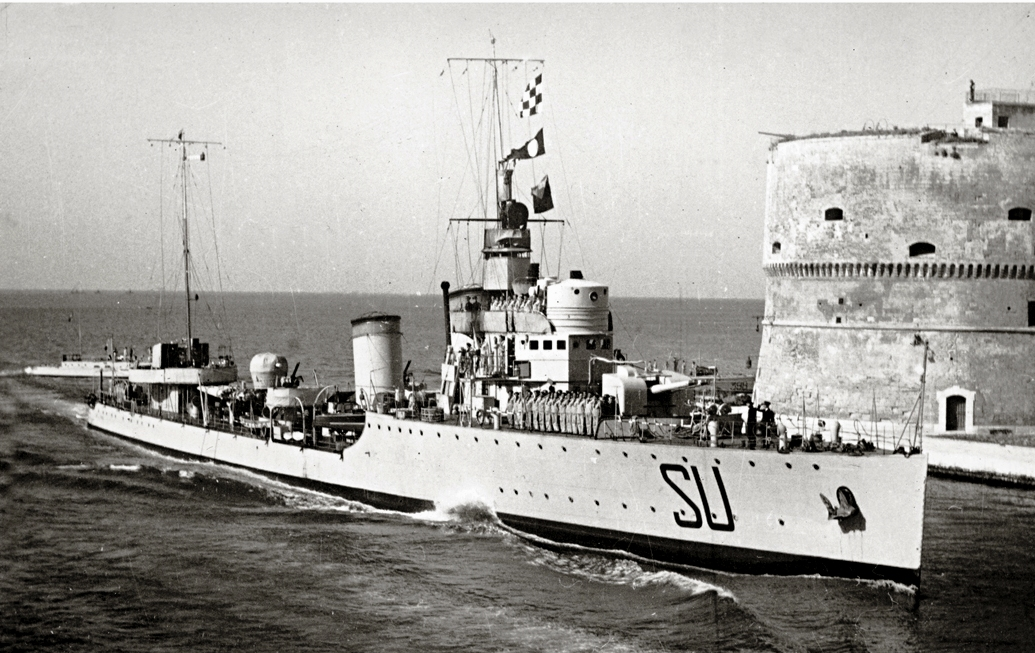
Sauro class

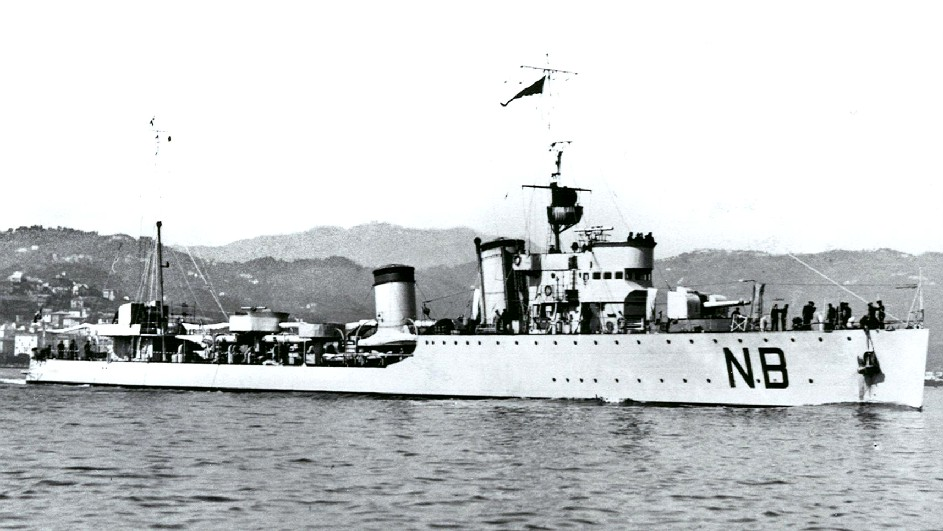
Turbine class

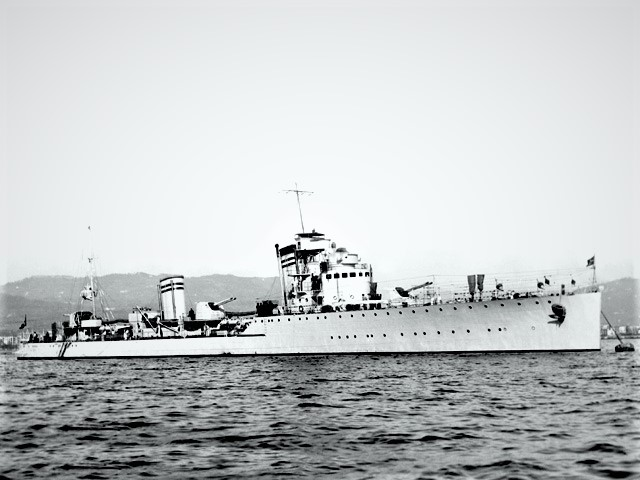
Navigatori class

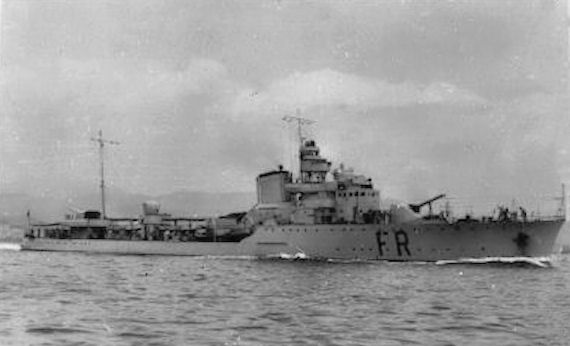
Freccia class or Dardo class

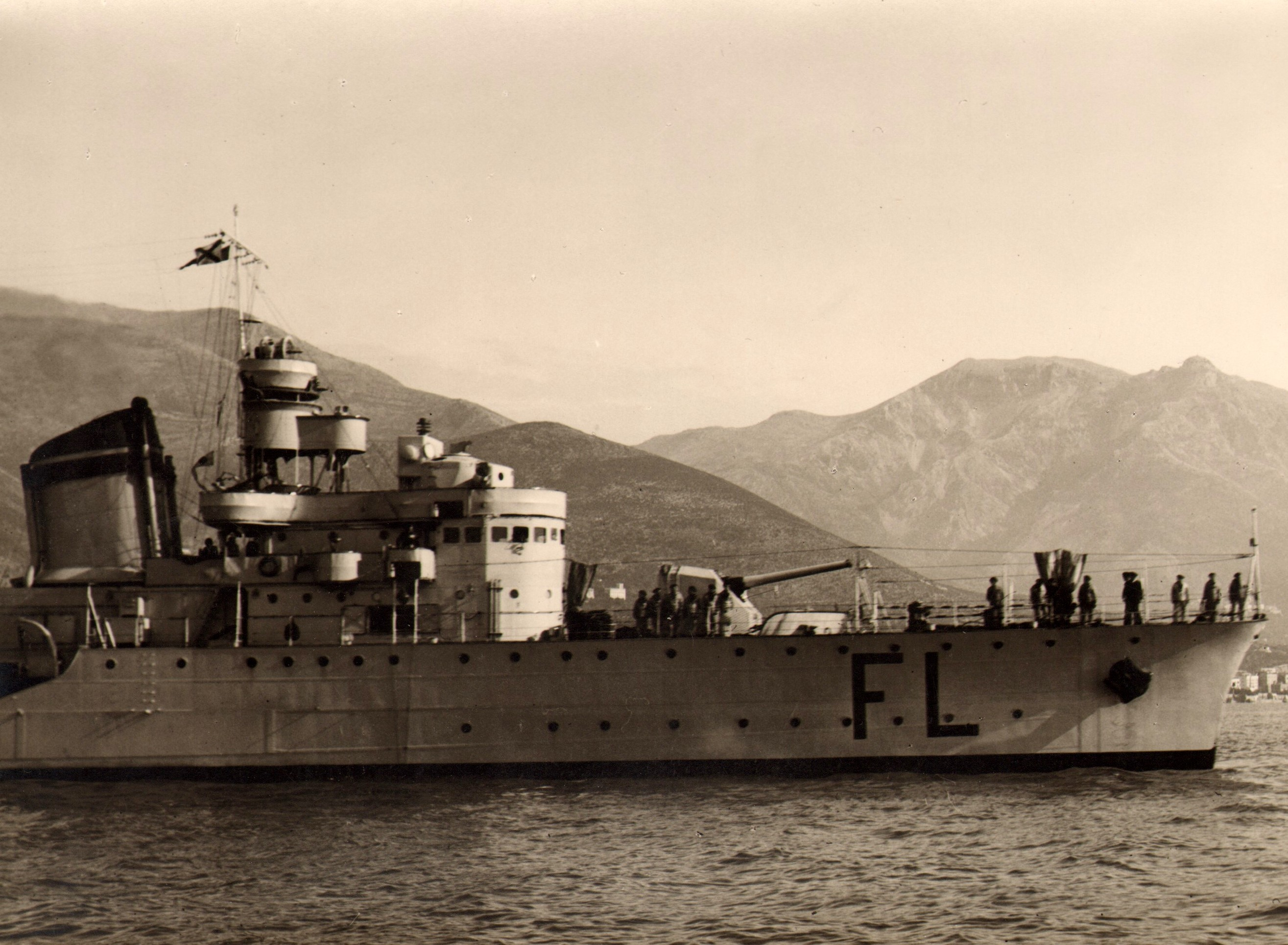
Folgore class

Maestrale class

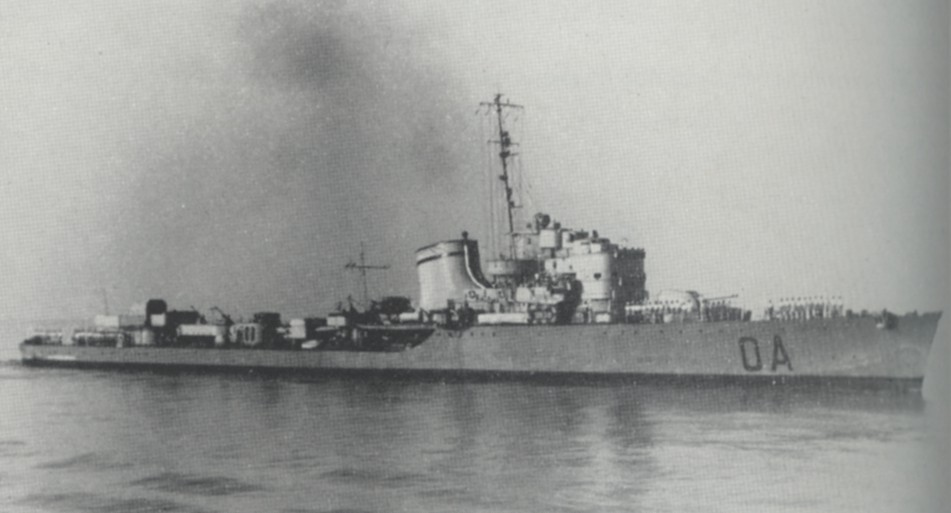
Oriani class or Poeti class

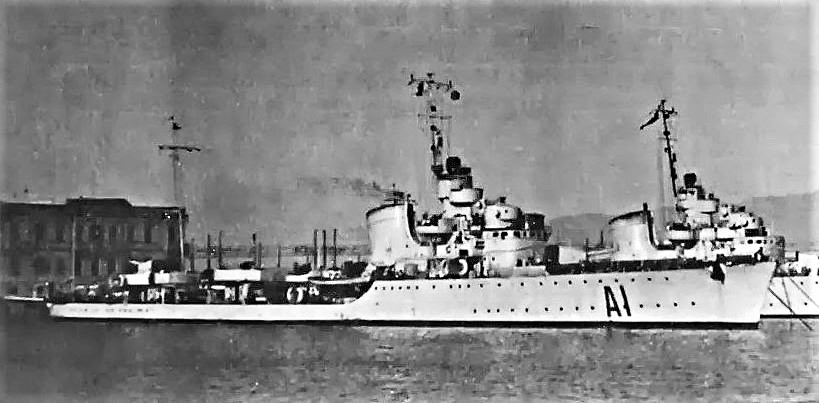
Batch 1 Soldati class

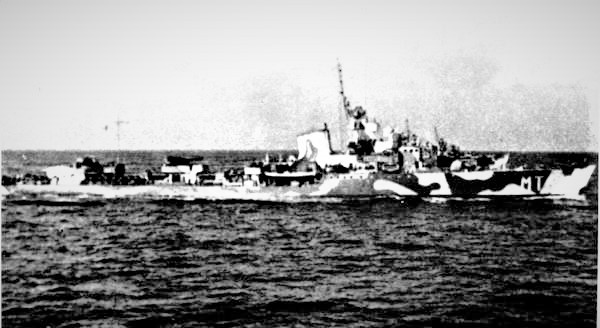
Batch 2 Soldati class

== See also ==
- List of Italian destroyers
- Destroyer
- Regia Marina

== Bibliography ==
- Jackson, Ashley (2006). The British Empire and the Second World War. London: Hambledon Continuum. ISBN 1-85285-417-0.
- Whitley, M J (2000). Destroyers of World War Two: An International Encyclopedia. London: Arms and Armour Press. ISBN 1-85409-521-8.
