= Guépard-class destroyer =

1928 class of French destroyers

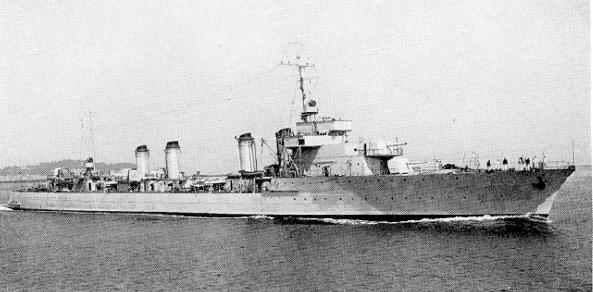
- Guépard-class destroyer

Class overview
- Name: Guépard class
- Operators: French Navy; Regia Marina; Kriegsmarine
- Preceded by: Chacal class
- Succeeded by: Aigle class
- Built: 1927–1931
- In commission: 1929–1945
- Completed: 6
- Lost: 6

General characteristics (as built)
- Type: Destroyer
- Displacement: 2,436 t (2,398 long tons) (standard); 3,220 t (3,170 long tons) (full load)
- Length: 130.2 m (427 ft 2 in)
- Beam: 11.5 m (37 ft 9 in)
- Draft: 4.3 m (14 ft 1 in)
- Installed power: 4 du Temple boilers; 64,000 PS (47,000 kW; 63,000 shp)
- Propulsion: 2 shafts; 2 geared steam turbines
- Speed: 35.5 knots (65.7 km/h; 40.9 mph)
- Range: 3,000 nmi (5,600 km; 3,500 mi) at 14.5 knots (26.9 km/h; 16.7 mph)
- Crew: 12 officers, 224 crewmen (wartime)
- Armament: 5 × single Canon de 138 mm Modèle 1923 guns; 4 × single 37 mm (1.5 in) AA guns; 2 × triple 550 mm (21.7 in) torpedo tubes; 2 chutes; 4 throwers for 28 depth charges

The Guépard class consisted of six destroyers (contre-torpilleurs) built for the French Navy during the 1920s. The class saw action in World War II, none surviving the war. Bison was sunk during the Norwegian campaign in May 1940 by German dive bombers, while the surviving ships joined the Vichy French Navy after France surrendered to the Axis in June after losing the Battle of France. They were scuttled in November 1942 when the Germans attempted to seize the French fleet.

== Design and description ==
The Guépard-class ships were improved versions of the preceding Jaguar class. They had an overall length of 130.2 meters (427 ft 2 in), a beam of 11.5 meters (37 ft 9 in), and a draft of 4.68 meters (15 ft 4 in). The ships displaced 2,436 metric tons (2,398 long tons) at standard load and 3,220 metric tons (3,170 long tons) at deep load. They had a metacentric height of 0.68 m (2 ft 3 in) and their hull was divided by a 11 transverse bulkheads into a dozen watertight compartments. Their crew consisted of 10 officers and 200 crewmen in peacetime and 102 officers and 224 enlisted men in wartime.

The ships were powered by two geared steam turbines, each driving one 3.7-or-3.8-meter (12 ft 2 in or 12 ft 6 in) propeller using steam provided by four du Temple boilers that operated at a pressure of 20 kg/cm^{2} (1,961 kPa; 284 psi) and a temperature of 215 °C (419 °F). The turbines were designed to produce 64,000 metric horsepower (47,000 kW; 63,000 shp) which was intended give the ships a speed of 36 knots (67 km/h; 41 mph). They comfortably exceeded their designed speed; the fastest of the ships, Valmy, reached a speed of 38.53 knots (71.36 km/h; 44.34 mph) from 76,948 PS (56,595 kW; 75,895 shp) during her sea trials. The Guépard's carried 572 t (563 long tons) of fuel oil which gave them a range of 3,000 nautical miles (5,600 km; 3,500 mi) at 14.5 knots (26.9 km/h; 16.7 mph).

The main battery of the Aigle class consisted of five 40-caliber 138.6-millimeter (5.5 in) Modèle 1923 guns in single shielded mounts, one superfiring pair fore and aft of the superstructure and the fifth gun abaft the rear funnel. Their anti-aircraft armament consisted of four semi-automatic 37-millimeter (1.5 in) Modèle 1927 guns in single mounts positioned amidships. They were equipped with two rotating triple mounts for 550-millimeter (21.7 in) torpedo tubes, one mount between the two pairs of funnels as well as another aft of the rear funnel. A pair of depth charge chutes were built into their stern; these housed a total of sixteen 200-kilogram (440 lb) depth charges, with eight more in reserve. They were also fitted with four depth-charge throwers, two on each side abreast the forward pair of funnels, for which the ships carried a dozen 100-kilogram (220 lb) depth charges.

== Ships ==
- Bison

Built by Arsenal de Lorient.
Completed 10 October 1930.
She was sunk by German Junkers Ju 87 Stukas while taking part in the evacuation of Namsos, on 3 May 1940, off Trondheim. Out of 229 members on the crew, 136 were lost. Survivors from Bison were picked up by HMS Afridi, which was then also sunk by the Stukas.

- Guépard ("Cheetah")

Built by Arsenal de Lorient.
Completed 13 August 1929,
Scuttled 27 November 1942.
Refloated 4 September 1943.
Bombed and sunk March 1944.
Refloated 1947 and broken up.

- Lion

Built by Ateliers et Chantiers de France, Dunkirk.
Completed 21 January 1931.
Seized by Germans 27 November 1942.
Given to Italy and entered service as FR 21.
Scuttled La Spezia 9 September 1943.

- Valmy (named after the battle of Valmy)

Built by Ateliers et Chantiers de St Nazaire-Penhoët, St. Nazaire
Completed 1 January 1930.
Seized by Germans 27 November 1942.
Refloated 15 March 1943 and began refit as Italian Navy FR 24
Captured by Germans at Savona September 1943
Wreck found at Genoa 1945 and broken up.

- Verdun (named after the battle of Verdun)

Built by Ateliers et Chantiers de la Loire, St Nazaire.
Completed 1 April 1930.
Scuttled 27 November 1942.
Refloated 29 September 1943.
Bombed and sunk 1944
Refloated 1948 and broken up in Italy.

- Vauban (named after Marshal Sébastien Le Prestre de Vauban)

Built by Ateliers et Chantiers de France, Dunkirk.
Completed 9 January 1931.
Scuttled 27 November 1942.
Refloated 12 May 1947 and broken up.
