= French destroyer Bison (1928) =

Destroyer of the French Navy

Coordinates: 64°27′57″N 11°29′03″E

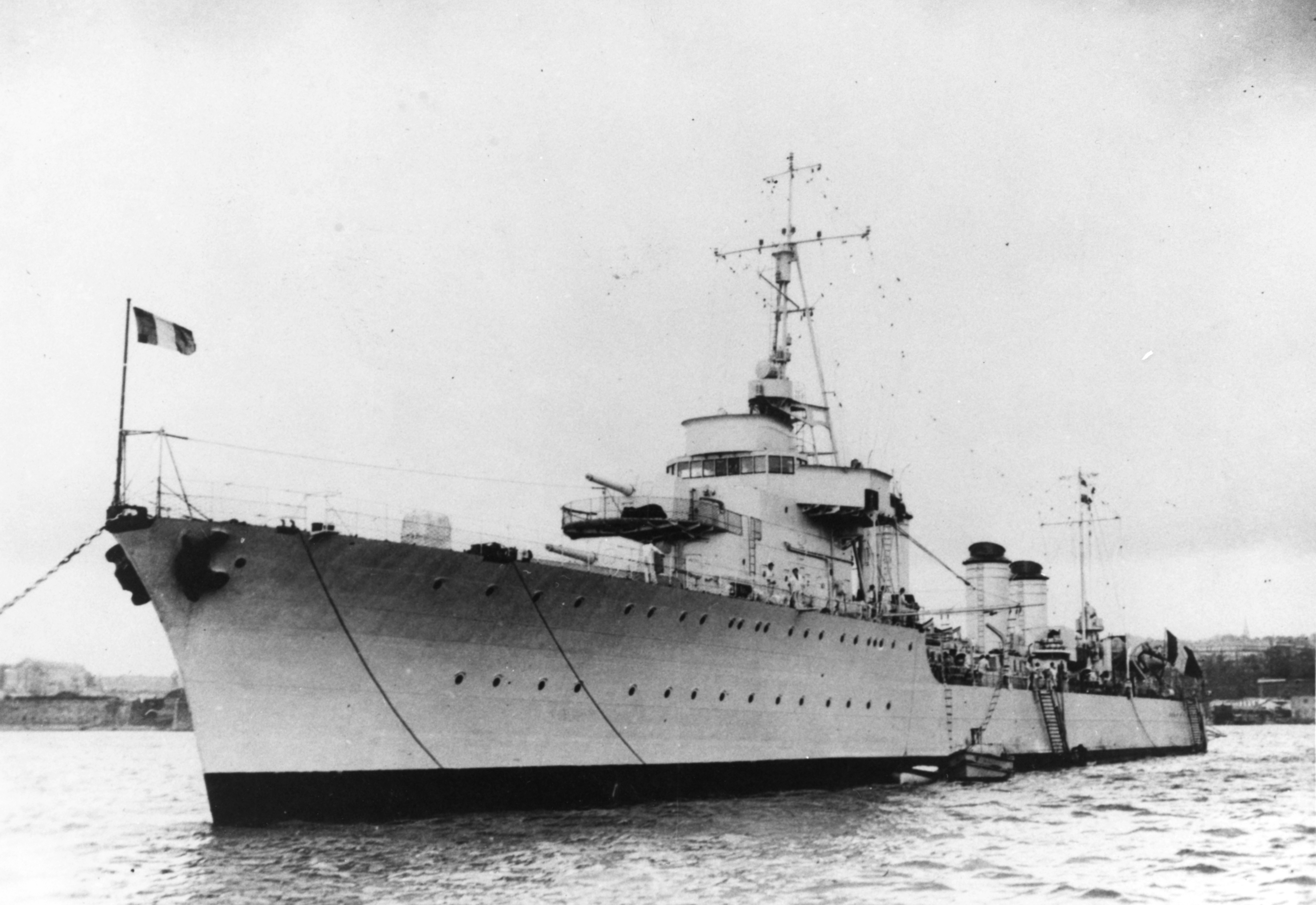
- Bison in the early 1930s

History

France
- Name: Bison
- Namesake: Bison
- Builder: Arsenal de Lorient
- Launched: 29 October 1928
- Fate: Sunk, 3 May 1940

General characteristics (as built)
- Class & type: Guépard-class destroyer
- Displacement: 2,436 t (2,398 long tons) (standard); 3,220 t (3,170 long tons) (full load)
- Length: 130.2 m (427 ft 2 in)
- Beam: 11.5 m (37 ft 9 in)
- Draft: 4.3 m (14 ft 1 in)
- Installed power: 4 du Temple boilers; 64,000 PS (47,000 kW; 63,000 shp)
- Propulsion: 2 shafts; 2 geared steam turbines
- Speed: 35.5 knots (65.7 km/h; 40.9 mph)
- Range: 3,000 nmi (5,600 km; 3,500 mi) at 14.5 knots (26.9 km/h; 16.7 mph)
- Crew: 12 officers, 224 crewmen (wartime)
- Armament: 5 × single 138.6 mm (5.5 in) guns; 4 × single 37 mm (1.5 in) AA guns; 2 × triple 550 mm (21.7 in) torpedo tubes; 2 chutes; 4 throwers for 36 depth charges

The French destroyer Bison was a Guépard-class destroyer (contre-torpilleur) built for the French Navy during the 1920s. Completed in 1930, the ship participated in the Second World War and was sunk during the Norwegian campaign of 1940 by German dive bombers.

== Design and description ==
The Guépard-class ships were improved versions of the preceding Jaguar class. They had an overall length of 130.2 meters (427 ft 2 in), a beam of 11.5 meters (37 ft 9 in), and a draft of 4.68 meters (15 ft 4 in). The ships displaced 2,436 metric tons (2,398 long tons) at standard load and 3,220 metric tons (3,170 long tons) at deep load. Their crew consisted of 10 officers and 200 crewmen in peacetime and 102 officers and 224 enlisted men in wartime.

The ships were powered by two geared steam turbines, each driving a propeller shaft using steam provided by four du Temple boilers. The turbines were designed to produce 64,000 metric horsepower (47,000 kW; 63,000 shp) which was intended give the ships a speed of 35.5 knots (65.7 km/h; 40.9 mph). During her sea trials on 20 December 1929, Bison sustained a speed of 36.23 knots (67.10 km/h; 41.69 mph) from 64,990 PS (47,800 kW; 64,100 shp). The ships carried enough fuel oil to give them a range of 3,000 nautical miles (5,600 km; 3,500 mi) at 14.5 knots (26.9 km/h; 16.7 mph).

The main battery of the Guépard class consisted of five 138.6-millimeter (5.5 in) Modèle 1923 guns in single shielded mounts, one superfiring pair fore and aft of the superstructure and the fifth gun abaft the rear funnel. Their anti-aircraft armament consisted of four semi-automatic 37-millimeter (1.5 in) Modèle 1927 guns in single mounts positioned amidships. They were equipped with two rotating triple mounts for 550-millimeter (21.7 in) torpedo tubes, one mount between the two pairs of funnels as well as another aft of the rear funnel. A pair of depth charge chutes were built into their stern; these housed a total of sixteen 200-kilogram (440 lb) depth charges, with eight more in reserve. They were also fitted with four depth-charge throwers, two on each side abreast the forward pair of funnels, for which the ships carried a dozen 100-kilogram (220 lb) depth charges.

== Construction and career ==
Bison served during the Norwegian Campaign in World War II. While evacuating Allied troops at Namsos, the ship came under German air attack and exploded after being struck in the forward magazine by a bomb, dropped by a Ju 87 from I./StG 1, killing 136 members of her crew and causing the ship to sink by the bow. The British destroyer HMS Afridi came to the aid of the surviving crew, rescuing sixty-nine of the French sailors in the water and sinking the hull of the ship. However, Afridi soon came under air attack and sank as well, and among the dead were thirty-five of the surviving crew of Bison. The surviving crews from Bison, Afridi, and the troops they had evacuated were rescued by the destroyers Imperial, Griffin and Grenade.
