= HMS Bittern (L07) =

Sloop of the Royal Navy

Coordinates: 64°28′N 11°30′E

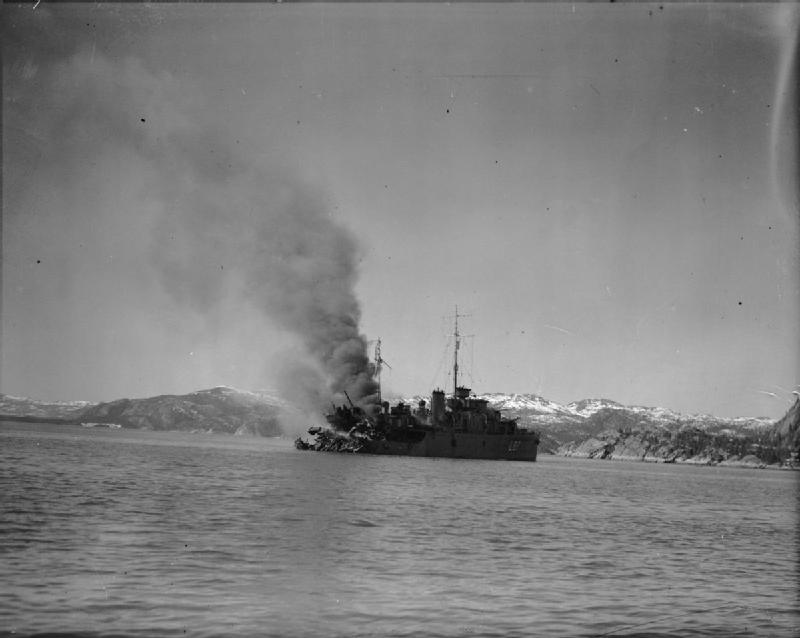
- Bittern ablaze in Namsos Fjord after having suffered a hit in the stern by a bomb

History

United Kingdom
- Name: Bittern
- Builder: J. Samuel White, Cowes, Isle of Wight
- Laid down: 27 August 1936
- Launched: 14 July 1937
- Commissioned: 15 March 1938
- Identification: Pennant number: L07
- Fate: Sunk by German bombers, 30 April 1940

General characteristics
- Class & type: Bittern-class sloop
- Displacement: 1,190 tons
- Length: 266 ft (81 m)
- Beam: 37 ft (11 m)
- Installed power: 3,300 hp (2,500 kW)
- Propulsion: Geared steam turbines on two shafts
- Speed: 18.75 knots (34.73 km/h; 21.58 mph)
- Complement: 125
- Armament: 6 × 4 in (102 mm) a/a guns; 4 × 0.5 in (13 mm) a/a machine guns

HMS Bittern was a Bittern-class sloop of the Royal Navy. Although the last to be completed she was the name ship of her class, replacing an earlier Bittern which had been re-named before launch. Bittern was laid down on 27 August 1936 by J. Samuel White, of Cowes, Isle of Wight, launched on 14 July 1937 and completed on 15 March 1938.

She served in Home waters and off the coast of Norway during the Second World War. She took part in the ill-fated Namsos Campaign of 1940, where she was used to defend Allied troop ships entering and leaving Namsos harbour from submarine attacks. The harbour came under regular air attack by the Luftwaffe, and on 30 April, Bittern was spotted by a squadron of Junkers Ju 87 dive bombers. Bittern came under repeated attack from 0700 hours. She was hit and severely damaged, being set on fire by a bomb dropped from Oberleutnant Elmo Schäfer's aircraft belonging to I./StG 1. Nearby Allied ships came alongside and took the survivors off. When this had been completed, Bittern was sunk by a torpedo from the destroyer Janus.

In 2011 it was reported that the ship has started to leak some of its roughly 200,000 litres (44,000 imp gal; 53,000 US gal) of oil.
