= HMS Afridi (F07) =

British Tribal-class destroyer

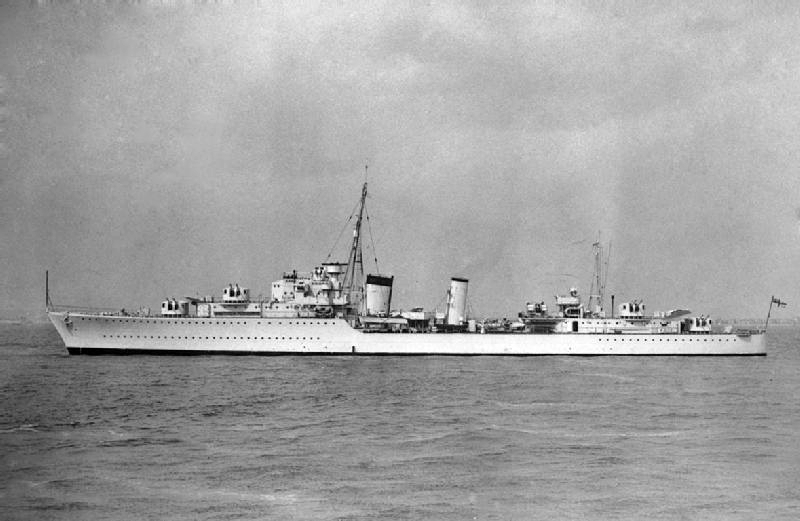
- Afridi as completed, 1938

History

United Kingdom
- Name: Afridi
- Namesake: Afridi
- Ordered: 10 March 1936
- Builder: Vickers-Armstrongs, Newcastle-on-Tyne
- Cost: £341,462
- Laid down: 9 June 1936
- Launched: 8 June 1937
- Completed: 29 April 1938
- Commissioned: 3 May 1938
- Identification: Pennant number: L07, later F07
- Fate: Sunk by aircraft, 3 May 1940

General characteristics (as built)
- Class & type: Tribal-class destroyer
- Displacement: 1,891 long tons (1,921 t) (standard); 2,519 long tons (2,559 t) (deep load)
- Length: 377 ft (114.9 m) (o/a)
- Beam: 36 ft 6 in (11.13 m)
- Draught: 11 ft 3 in (3.43 m)
- Installed power: 3 × Admiralty 3-drum boilers; 44,000 shp (33,000 kW)
- Propulsion: 2 × shafts; 2 × geared steam turbines
- Speed: 36 knots (67 km/h; 41 mph)
- Range: 5,700 nmi (10,600 km; 6,600 mi) at 15 knots (28 km/h; 17 mph)
- Complement: 190
- Sensors & processing systems: ASDIC
- Armament: 4 × twin 4.7 in (120 mm) guns; 1 × quadruple 2-pdr (40 mm (1.6 in)) AA guns; 2 × quadruple 0.5 in (12.7 mm) anti-aircraft machineguns; 1 × quadruple 21 in (533 mm) torpedo tubes; 20 × depth charges, 1 × rack, 2 × throwers

HMS Afridi was one of 16 Tribal-class destroyers built for the Royal Navy shortly before the beginning of Second World War in 1939. Completed in 1938 the ship was initially assigned to the Mediterranean Fleet where she served as a flotilla leader. Afridi was briefly involved enforcing the arms blockade on the combatants in the Spanish Civil War. The ship returned home shortly after the start of the Second World War and was assigned convoy escort duties. She played an active role in the Norwegian Campaign of April–May 1940, escorting convoys to and from Norway. Afridi was sunk by German dive bombers on 3 May as she was escorting the evacuation convoy after the failure of the Namsos Campaign.

== Description ==
The Tribals were intended to counter the large destroyers being built abroad and to improve the firepower of the existing destroyer flotillas and were thus significantly larger and more heavily armed than the preceding I class. The ships displaced 1,891 long tons (1,921 t) at standard load and 2,519 long tons (2,559 t) at deep load. They had an overall length of 377 feet (114.9 m), a beam of 36 feet 6 inches (11.13 m) and a draught of 11 feet 3 inches (3.43 m). The destroyers were powered by two Parsons geared steam turbines, each driving one propeller shaft using steam provided by three Admiralty three-drum boilers. The turbines developed a total of 44,000 shaft horsepower (33,000 kW) and gave a maximum speed of 36 knots (67 km/h; 41 mph). During her sea trials Afridi made 34.9 knots (64.6 km/h; 40.2 mph) from 44,720 shp (33,350 kW) at a displacement of 2,244 long tons (2,280 t). The ships carried enough fuel oil to give them a range of 5,700 nautical miles (10,600 km; 6,600 mi) at 15 knots (28 km/h; 17 mph). The ships' complement consisted of 190 officers and ratings, although the flotilla leaders carried an extra 20 officers and men consisting of the Captain (D) and his staff.

The primary armament of the Tribal-class destroyers was eight quick-firing (QF) 4.7-inch (120 mm) Mark XII guns in four superfiring twin-gun mounts, one pair each fore and aft of the superstructure, designated 'A', 'B', 'X', and 'Y' from front to rear. The mounts had a maximum elevation of 40°. For anti-aircraft (AA) defence, they carried a single quadruple mount for the 40-millimetre (1.6 in) QF two-pounder Mk II "pom-pom" gun and two quadruple mounts for the 0.5-inch (12.7 mm) Mark III machine gun. Low-angle fire for the main guns was controlled by the director-control tower (DCT) on the bridge roof that fed data acquired by it and the 12-foot (3.7 m) rangefinder on the Mk II Rangefinder/Director directly aft of the DCT to an analogue mechanical computer, the Mk I Admiralty Fire Control Clock. Anti-aircraft fire for the main guns was controlled by the Rangefinder/Director which sent data to the mechanical Fuze Keeping Clock.

The ships were fitted with a single above-water quadruple mount for 21-inch (533 mm) torpedoes. The Tribals were not intended as anti-submarine ships, but they were provided with ASDIC, one depth charge rack and two throwers for self-defence, although the throwers were not mounted in all ships; Twenty depth charges was the peacetime allotment, but this increased to 30 during wartime.

== Construction and career ==
Authorized as one of seven Tribal-class destroyers under the 1935 Naval Estimates, Afridi was the second ship of her name to serve in the Royal Navy. The ship was ordered on 10 March 1936 from Vickers-Armstrongs and was laid down on 9 June at the company's High Walker, Newcastle upon Tyne, shipyard. She was launched on 8 June 1937 by Lady Foster. Afridi was completed on 29 April 1938 and commissioned on 3 May at a cost of £341,462 which excluded weapons and communications outfits furnished by the Admiralty. The ship was initially assigned to the 1st Tribal Destroyer Flotilla with the Mediterranean Fleet and arriving at Malta on 3 June. In July, she sailed for the Mediterranean Spanish coast to enforce the arms embargo imposed by the Non-Intervention Committee on both sides of the Spanish Civil War. The following month Afridi hosted Rear-Admiral John Tovey, commander of the Mediterranean Fleet's destroyers, for exercises in the Ionian Sea. On 18 September, Afridi rendezvoused with her sister ship, Cossack, and the heavy cruiser Devonshire in the Aegean Sea before continuing onwards to Istanbul, Turkey, for a formal visit the next day. Rising tensions during the Munich Crisis caused the remainder of the Black Sea cruise to be cancelled on 21 September. The ship sailed for Alexandria, British Egypt, where the destroyer was briefly refitted from 9 November to 17 December. Afridi then joined the rest of the first batch of Tribals in Malta which had also been assigned to the flotilla and Captain G. H. Creswell could assume his role as Captain (D).

On 23 February 1939, the ship led her flotilla to Gibraltar where the Mediterranean and Home Fleets were gathering for combined exercises. These ran from 28 February to 18 March and involved dozens of ships from both commands. The ships of the Mediterranean Fleet then split up for visits to various nearby ports; Afridi was lightly damaged when she collided with the light cruiser Penelope off Palma de Mallorca in the Balearic Islands, during the transfer of mail on the night of 21/22 March and had to return to Malta for repairs. When Italy invaded Albania on 7 April, the Mediterranean Fleet was mobilised and remained on a war footing for most of May. During this time the 1st Tribal Destroyer Flotilla was redesignated as the 4th Destroyer Flotilla (DF). By July 7 tensions had decreased such that Afridi and her sisters Gurkha, Mohawk, and Sikh were able to escort the aircraft carrier Glorious on a visit to Athens, Greece. The following month, the fleet spent a week exercising in the area between the Greek island of Crete and British Cyprus. As tensions rose in Europe later in August, the fleet was mobilised and continued to train in preparation for war with Italy. As part of its preparations, the Admiralty had closed the Mediterranean to British shipping and Afridi and seven other destroyers escorted one group of ships that had collected at Suez, Egypt, through the Red Sea to reduce the congestion.

=== Second World War ===
When Britain declared war on Germany on 3 September, Afridi was still in the Red Sea. As Italy took steps to prove her neutrality, the destroyers were released from their mission and returned to Alexandria where they began escorting convoys and conducting contraband inspections of non-British ships. This was not the best use of the Tribals and the 4th DF was ordered back to England in October. It was based at Immingham on the Humber and mostly escorted convoys up and down the eastern coast of Britain. The flotilla was transferred to Rosyth, Scotland, to carry out convoy escort duties between the UK and Norway in December. Cresswell was relieved by Captain Philip Vian on 31 December.

By January 1940, a number of defects had become noticeable, including leaks and problems with turbine blades that caused Afridi to begin a refit at a commercial shipyard in West Hartlepool on 17 January. Vian decided that Captain Robert Sherbrooke of Cossack needed some leave and so exchanged ships with him for the duration of the refit which lasted until 19 March. The 4th DF was then allocated to Plan R 4, a preemptive occupation of cities in western Norway after a German invasion had begun, and was tasked to escort the troop-laden ships of the 1st Cruiser Squadron to Bergen and Stavanger. The Germans decided to move first and occupied most Norwegian ports in a sea- and airborne assault (Operation Weserübung) on 9 April that took both the Norwegians and the Allies by surprise.

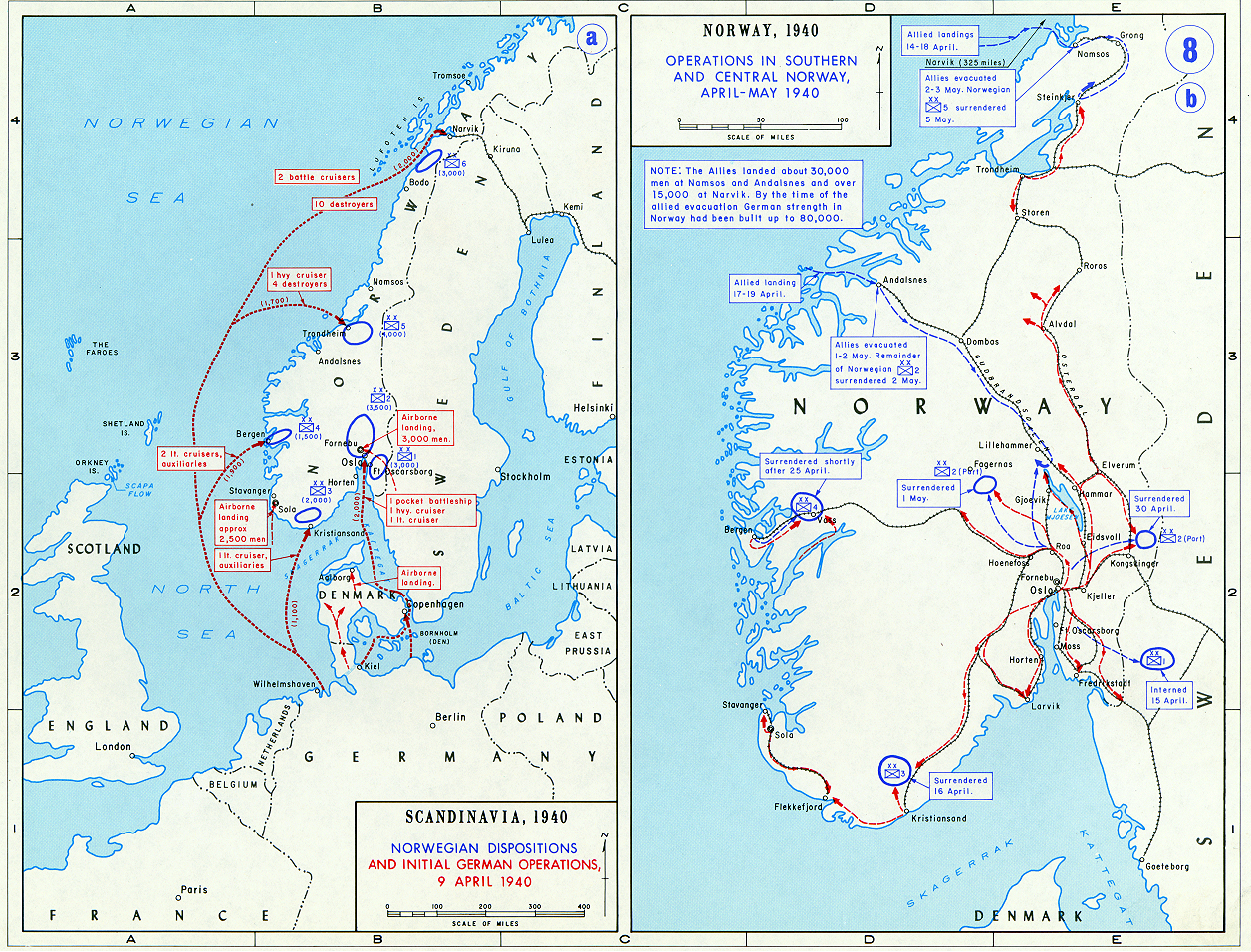
Maps covering the operations in central and southern Norway, April–May 1940

Receiving word that the Royal Air Force had attacked north-bound German warships in the North Sea on 7 April, the Home Fleet put to sea that evening. The 2nd Cruiser Squadron departed Rosyth with its two light cruisers, escorted by Afridi and the 4th DF, with orders to sweep through the North Sea before rendezvousing with the main body of the Home Fleet. On the morning of 9 April the 4th DF, minus Tartar, was tasked with attacking Bergen, covered by the 18th Cruiser Squadron, but the Admiralty cancelled the attack that afternoon when it received reports that two German light cruisers were in port. As the British ships were falling back on the main body of the Home Fleet, they were attacked by 88 bombers of Bomber Wing 26 (Kampfgeschwader 26) and Bomber Wing 30 (Kampfgeschwader 30), sinking Gurkha and lightly damaging the battleship Rodney.

After refuelling at Scapa Flow the following day, Afridi, five of her sisters and two light cruisers departed on the evening of 11 April, arriving off Stadlandet the following morning. The destroyers were split up to search the area for German ships before rendezvousing with the cruisers at dusk, but an inaccurate spot report of a German battlecruiser and cruiser that afternoon, interrupted the searches when the destroyers were recalled. On the morning of 13 April the destroyers were sent to search the Romsdalsfjord and only found four merchant ships. As they were leaving Ålesund they were unsuccessfully attacked by a dozen bombers from III Group, Demonstration Wing 1 (Lehrgeschwader 1). The following morning they were ordered north to the Namsos area to examine its suitability for an Allied landing and to coordinate with local Norwegian forces. Harbour facilities were assessed as inadequate and that troops should be landed elsewhere and transferred to destroyers for off-loading at Namsos. The Admiralty ordered that the 148th Infantry Brigade, already at sea, to be diverted to the anchorage at Lillesjona; its troopships arrived there at dawn on 16 April and began transferring their troops to the destroyers after they had completed refuelling. Major General Adrian Carton de Wiart, commander of the Namsos-area forces, also moved from Somali to Afridi. Half-a-dozen Luftwaffe bombers disrupted the transfer that afternoon, but their only success was to put some fragments through Afridi's bow. The destroyers unloaded their troops that night and the rest of the troops arrived the following evening. The destroyers and their covering cruisers were ordered home on 19 April and Afridi transferred Carton de Wiart to the anti-aircraft cruiser Cairo before departing.

Afridi and four other destroyers escorted a small supply convoy to Åndalsnes and Molde that was so heavily attacked by the Luftwaffe on 27 April that they had to abort their mission before two of the ships could complete their unloading. The former town was set on fire, but the ships only suffered splinter damage. They were attacked again the following day as they withdrew.

The Allied defeat during the Namsos Campaign forced them to evacuate the survivors. Afridi was one of the escorts for the troopships that arrived at the entrance to the Namsenfjorden on 1 May to take them off, but thick fog delayed them until the following day. On the evening of 2 May, the destroyer led the heavy cruiser York and three French troopships to Namsos. Two transports were able to dock in the harbour, but the third and York had to have the troops ferried to them by the destroyers and trawlers. All the ships except Afridi departed at 02:30, but she waited until 03:15 for the rearguard to reach the port before leaving herself.

The Germans spotted the evacuation convoy early that morning and Luftwaffe attacks began around 08:45. At 10:00 a Junkers Ju 87 "Stuka" dive bomber of I Group, Dive-bomber Wing 1 (Sturzkampfgeschwader 1) hit the French destroyer Bison with a bomb that caused her forward magazine to explode. Afridi and the destroyers Imperial and Grenade went to her aid and fought off two more air attacks while rescuing survivors. Afridi sank Bison by gunfire around noon after twice missing with torpedoes and departed the area with 69 survivors on board. When she rejoined the convoy at 14:00, another dive bombing attack developed. The ship was targeted by more Stukas diving from each side, making evasive manoeuvres ineffectual. She was hit by two bombs, one passing through the wireless telegraphy office and exploding beside the forward boiler room, the second hitting just forward of the bridge and starting a severe fire at the after end of the mess decks. Imperial came alongside to port and Griffin to starboard to take aboard survivors. At 14:45 hours, Afridi capsized and sank bow-first with the loss of 52 crewmen at 66°14′N 05°45′E. Thirteen soldiers were also lost—the only casualties among the whole force evacuated from Åndalsnes and Namsos–and 30 of the 69 Frenchmen she had picked up from Bison.

== See also ==
- Afridi, the ethnic group, in present-day Pakistan, erstwhile British India, after which the ship was named
