= HMS Grenade (H86) =

Royal Navy destroyer

Coordinates: 51°24′28″N 2°49′10″E

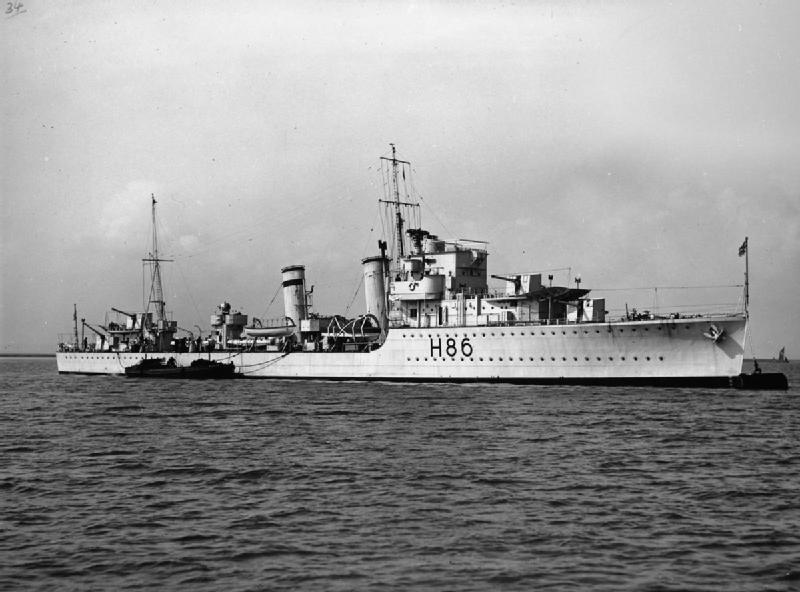
- Grenade in 1936

History

United Kingdom
- Name: Grenade
- Builder: Alexander Stephen and Sons, Linthouse, Glasgow
- Laid down: 3 October 1934
- Launched: 12 November 1935
- Commissioned: 28 March 1936
- Identification: Pennant number: H86
- Fate: Sunk, 29 May 1940

General characteristics (as built)
- Class & type: G-class destroyer
- Displacement: 1,350 long tons (1,370 t) (standard); 1,883 long tons (1,913 t) (deep load)
- Length: 323 ft (98.5 m)
- Beam: 33 ft (10.1 m)
- Draught: 12 ft 5 in (3.8 m)
- Installed power: 3 Admiralty 3-drum boilers; 34,000 shp (25,000 kW)
- Propulsion: 2 shafts, 2 geared steam turbines
- Speed: 36 knots (67 km/h; 41 mph)
- Range: 5,530 nmi (10,240 km; 6,360 mi) at 15 knots (28 km/h; 17 mph)
- Complement: 137 (peacetime), 146 (wartime)
- Armament: 4 × single 4.7 in (120 mm) guns; 2 × quadruple 0.5 in (12.7 mm) machine guns; 2 × quadruple 21 in (533 mm) torpedo tubes; 20 × depth charges, 1 rail and 2 throwers

HMS Grenade (H86) was a G-class destroyer built for the Royal Navy during the 1930s. She was transferred from the Mediterranean Fleet shortly after the beginning of World War II for service in home waters. The ship participated in the early stages of the Norwegian Campaign in April 1940. German Junkers Ju 87 Stuka dive bombers sank Grenade as she evacuated Allied troops during Operation Dynamo on 29 May 1940.

== Description ==
Grenade displaced 1,350 long tons (1,370 t) at standard load and 1,883 long tons (1,913 t) at deep load. The ship had an overall length of 323 feet (98.5 m), a beam of 33 feet (10.1 m) and a draught of 12 feet 5 inches (3.8 m). She was powered by Parsons geared steam turbines, driving two shafts, which developed a total of 34,000 shaft horsepower (25,000 kW) and gave a maximum speed of 36 knots (67 km/h; 41 mph). Steam for the turbines was provided by three Admiralty 3-drum water-tube boilers. Grenade carried a maximum of 470 long tons (480 t) of fuel oil that gave her a range of 5,530 nautical miles (10,240 km; 6,360 mi) at 15 knots (28 km/h; 17 mph). The ship's complement was 137 officers and men in peacetime.

The ship mounted four 45-calibre 4.7-inch (120 mm) Mark IX guns in single mounts. For anti-aircraft defence Grenade had two quadruple Mark I mounts for the 0.5 inch Vickers Mark III machine gun. She was fitted with two above-water quadruple torpedo tube mounts for 21-inch (533 mm) torpedoes. One depth charge rail and two throwers were fitted; 20 depth charges were originally carried, but this increased to 35 shortly after the war began.

== Service ==
Grenade was laid down by Alexander Stephen and Sons in Glasgow, Scotland on 3 October 1934, launched on 12 November 1935 and completed on 28 March 1936. Excluding government-furnished equipment like the armament, the ship cost £252,560. (Note: Adjusted for inflation to 2026 pounds, £15,628,081.) She was assigned to the 1st Destroyer Flotilla of the Mediterranean Fleet upon commissioning. Grenade was given a post-completion overhaul in Malta between 20 March and 24 April 1937. After returning home to give her crew leave and be refitted in Chatham Dockyard between 27 May and July 1938, the ship was then briefly transferred to the Red Sea in October 1938.

When World War II began in September 1939, Grenade was in Alexandria, but she, and her entire flotilla, was transferred to the Western Approaches Command at Plymouth in October. On 7 November she collided with her flotilla leader, Grenville and her repairs were not completed until 9 December. During the next several months she was assigned to contraband control duties in the Downs. She, and her sister ship, Griffin, rescued 117 survivors from Grenville after the latter ship struck a mine on 19 January 1940. The ship was refitted in London between 27 January and 27 February, but was struck by the ocean liner Orion on 27 February and was only temporarily repaired there. Grenade received permanent repairs in Harwich from 2 March to 3 April and was assigned to Home Fleet at Scapa Flow after their completion.

When Britain received word that the Germans were preparing to invade Norway on 7/8 April, Grenade was part of the escort of Convoy ON25 and was recalled, along with the rest of the escort, to join the Home Fleet. The ship, and the destroyer Encounter, escorted the oil tanker British Lady to Flakstadøya in the Lofoten Islands where a refuelling and repair base was being set up to support British naval operations in northern Norway. For the rest of the month Grenade escorted the battleship Warspite and the aircraft carrier Ark Royal in Norwegian waters. The ship provided cover during the evacuation of British and French troops from Namsos in early May and tied up to the French destroyer Bison to rescue survivors after the latter's forward magazine had been hit by a bomb from a Junkers Ju 87 dive bomber and exploded on 3 May. Four men on Grenade were wounded by splinters from near misses during this time and she rescued 36 sailors, but twenty of them died of their wounds before the ship reached Scapa Flow on 5 May.

Grenade was then transferred to the English Channel and collided with the anti-submarine trawler Clayton Wyke on 14 May in heavy fog. Her repairs were completed at Sheerness Dockyard on 25 May. During the initial stages of the evacuation from Dunkirk the ship provided cover in the northern part of the Channel to the evacuation forces and took part in the rescue of 33 survivors on 28 May from the coaster SS Abukir, which had been torpedoed by an E-boat. She made one trip to Dunkirk during the night of 28/29 May and was caught in Dunkirk harbour by German Stukas during the following day. Grenade was hit by two bombs which set her afire and killed 14 sailors and mortally wounded another four men. The ship was cast off from her berth, in case she sank there, and then drifted into the harbour channel. The trawler John Cattling towed Grenade over to the west side of the outer harbour where her magazines exploded later that evening.
