= Namsos campaign =

1940 military campaign in Namsos, Norway

- Part of the Norwegian campaign of the Second World War
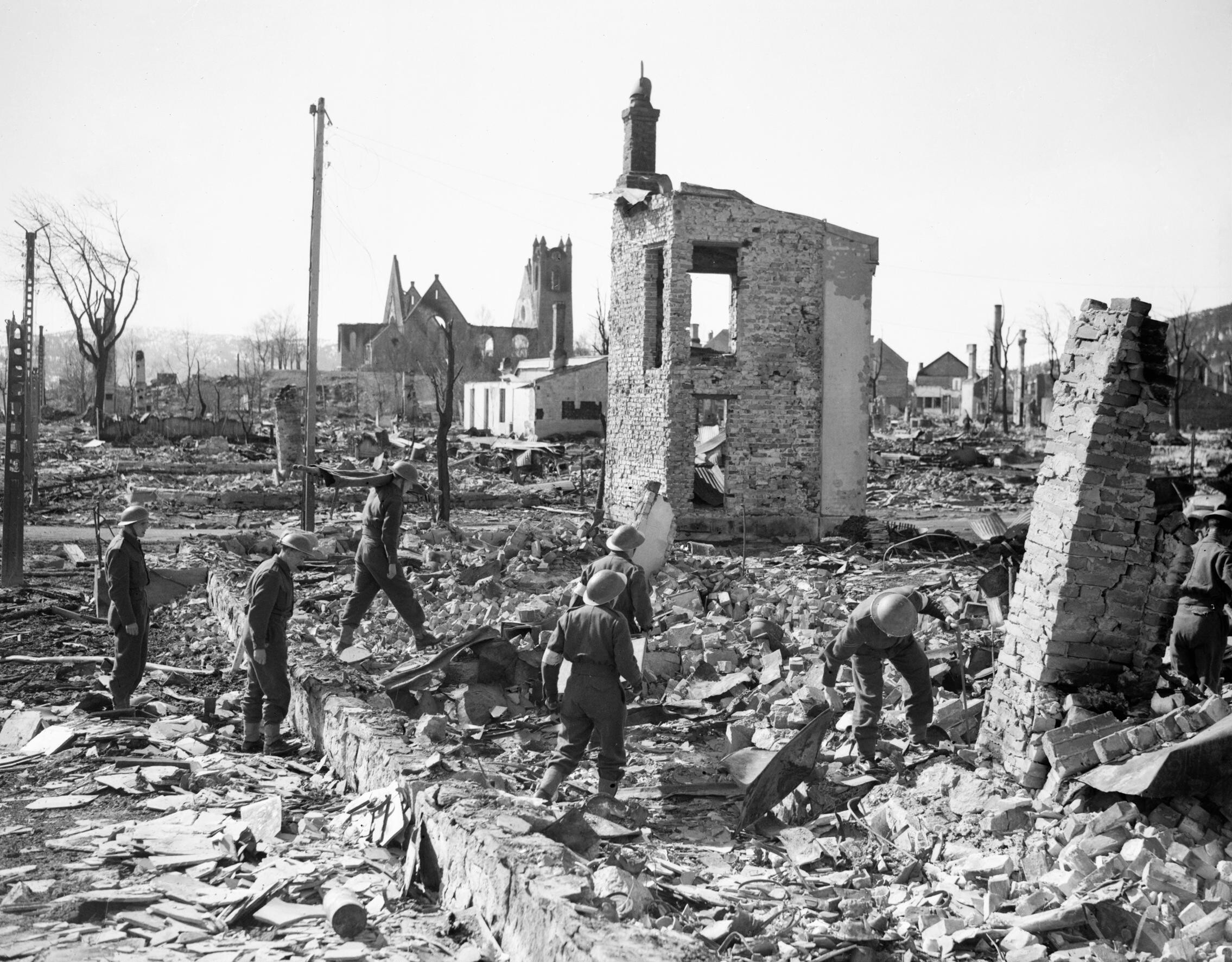
- British troops pick through the ruins of Namsos after a German air raid, April 1940.
Date	April–May, 1940
Location	Namsos, Norway 64°28′09″N 11°29′42″E
Result	German victory

Belligerents
United Kingdom; France; Norway	Germany

Commanders and leaders
(United Kingdom) Adrian Carton De Wiart (France) Sylvestre Gérard Audet (Norway) Ole Berg Getz	

Strength
3,500 British; 2,500 French; 500 Norwegian	6,000

Casualties and losses
British: 19 killed 42 wounded 96 missing	

The Namsos campaign, in Namsos, Norway, and vicinity took place between Anglo-French and Norwegian naval and military forces against German military, naval and air forces in April and early May 1940. It was one of the first occasions during the Second World War when British and French land forces fought the German Army.

== Background ==
When the Second World War broke out in September 1939, Norway followed a policy of neutrality, as it had done during the First World War, hoping to stay out of the war once again engulfing Europe. Norway was at peace in April 1940 when it was suddenly attacked by naval, air and military forces from Nazi Germany. Unlike in the First World War, the Norwegian military was only partially mobilised, with the Royal Norwegian Navy and the coastal artillery being set up with skeleton crews. The Norwegian Army activated only a few battalions in North Norway (amongst others the Alta Battalion) as a precaution in connection with the Soviet Winter War against Finland. Although the Norwegian Government had carried out a hurried modernisation of the military in the second half of the 1930s, the armed forces were disorganised. Effects of the wide-ranging budget reductions carried out during the pacifist policies of the late 1920s and early 1930s were still apparent. In 1940, the Norwegian armed forces were among the weakest in Europe.

There were several reasons for the German attack. Not least was a desire to secure the flow of iron ore from mines at Kiruna in the north of Sweden to Germany's war industries. The northern part of the Baltic Sea, called the Gulf of Bothnia, had a principal Swedish port called Luleå from where in the summer a quantity of ore was shipped. It was frozen in winter, so for several months each year the Swedes shipped most of their iron ore by rail through the ice-free port of Narvik in the far north of Norway. In a normal year, 80 percent of the iron ore was exported through Narvik. The only alternative in winter was a long rail journey to Oxelösund on the Baltic, south of Stockholm, which was not obstructed by ice. British information suggested that Oxelösund could ship only a fifth the amount Germany required. Without the Swedish iron ore shipments through Narvik, the German war industry could not have produced as many tanks, guns, submarines and other weapons.

The Admiralty was investigating the possibility of sending ships into the Baltic Sea in the spring of 1940 (Operation Catherine) to interdict German seaborne trade during the summer months. The operation would have been pointless if the Narvik route remained open. The Germans rightly suspected that the British were planning to mine the Norwegian coastal waters used by German ore ships. British plans were well advanced but the Germans got to Norway first.

== Allied counter-attack plans ==
Narvik, Trondheim, Oslo, Bergen and other Norwegian towns were seized on the first day of the campaign in a surprise attack. Elements of the Norwegian army fought the Germans north of Oslo. The British and French prime ministers and their military advisers were of one mind in deciding to retake Trondheim, link up with the Norwegians and block a German advance north. This would enable the Allies to cut much of Germany's iron ore supply route. A bonus would be air and naval bases in northern Norway.

It is at Trondheim that Norway becomes narrow, making it easier to block the Germans than further south. To turn the position, Germany would have to attack through Sweden, bringing that nation into the war on the Allied side. The retired Admiral of the Fleet Sir Roger Keyes, MP, repeatedly urged Churchill to seize Trondheim from the Germans, using obsolete battleships if necessary, and offered to lead the attack.

It was planned to force the entrance to Trondheimsfjord with battleships knocking out the Norwegian coastal forts at the entrance, recently captured by the Germans; an amphibious landing would take the city. It was also decided to land forces north and south of the fjord for a pincer attack on the city. The officers responsible for these decisions were the chiefs of staff of the armed forces, Sir Dudley Pound of the Royal Navy, General Sir Edmund Ironside of the British Army and Air Chief Marshal Sir Cyril Newall of the Royal Air Force (RAF).

The chiefs of staff had second thoughts; the forcing of the narrows was reduced to a demonstration, with the main thrust being the two pincers. This eliminated the immediate use of the Trondheim airfields by the RAF. It also meant that the military forces would face German naval units in the fjord as well as Luftwaffe units in the air. Churchill was disappointed but faced the combined opposition of his naval advisers as well as the heads of the army and the RAF and had to back down. Keyes was apoplectic and this event, more than any, convinced him to join in an attack on the Government at the end of the Norwegian campaign.

Namsos, then a town of 3,615 people, was felt to be the logical spot to land the troops assigned to the northern pincer, because of its location and facilities. The harbour and approaches to Namsos are ice free all year. Because of the trade in lumber, by 1940 Namsos port was furnished with three good wharves (one of stone) with a depth alongside of 18–30 ft (5.5–9.1 m) and lengths from 320–770 ft (98–235 m). This made it suitable for smaller warships and transports to dock and to land troops and supplies for the recapture of Trondheim. Namsos was on a branch line connecting to the Nordland Line. A gravel road led some 130 mi (210 km) south to Trondheim.

== Screening force ==
Captain Frank Pegram of the cruiser HMS Glasgow, accompanied by the cruiser HMS Sheffield and ten destroyers, landed a small party of Royal Marines in Namsos on 14 April 1940. The landing party was under the command of Captain Edds and took up blocking positions in the hills outside town which soon attracted German aircraft. The commander, Lieutenant-General Sir Adrian Carton De Wiart, V.C., flew in the next day and his Short Sunderland flying boat was strafed by German aircraft as it landed. His aide was wounded and had to return to Britain. De Wiart was an energetic and competent commander who inspired his troops by his bravery during air attacks but no Allied aircraft were available over Namsos to provide protection against the Luftwaffe.

De Wiart made the decision, because of unopposed enemy air activity, to divert his large, slow and vulnerable troopships 100 mi (160 km) north to Lillesjona in Nesna, where they would be offloaded to destroyers for a fast run into Namsos. He arrived there on 16 April to supervise the trans-shipment but less than an hour into the process, German bombers arrived and the British naval commander ordered the destroyers to sail with the troops and equipment they had on board. HMS Afridi, Nubian, Matabele, Mashona and Sikh got under way for Namsos carrying De Wiart with 36 officers and 1,208 other ranks. Though repeatedly attacked during their voyage, they arrived unscathed, if not rested, and got into Namsos about 9:00 p.m. on 16 April.

== Ashore and south ==
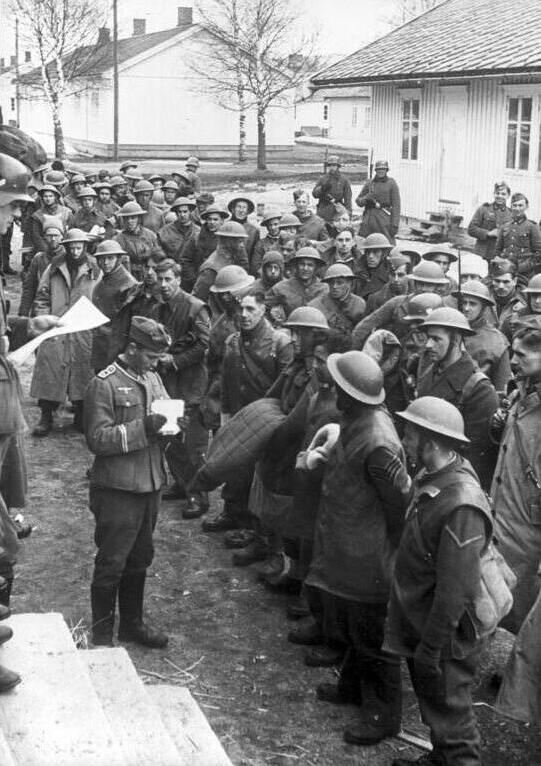
British PoWs in Trondheim April 1940.

De Wiart showed considerable vigour in managing the landing and dispersal of troops and supplies, getting them into the hills during the five hours of darkness in Namsos in late April. German air reconnaissance crews failed to spot that landings had occurred the previous night. He wasted no time in setting up a headquarters in Namsos and sent out guards to the long bridge over Namsosfjord, essential to one of the two roads south and moved others to occupy the village of Bangsund further south. He also sent 300 troops due east along the second, less direct, route south to Grong, where they linked up with small numbers of Norwegian troops under Colonel Ole Getz. Smaller groups were sent south of Bangsund to reach Beitstadfjorden, at the head of Trondheimsfjord.

De Wiart understood that speed was vital and that the force should reach Steinkjer, where the two roads south met, before the Germans got there from Trondheim. The naval commander, Admiral Geoffrey Layton, decided that taking his destroyers into Namsos was too risky. He would send troops and supplies in on the Polish transport MS Chrobry. Since most of the remaining troops at Lillesjona were aboard the RMS Empress of Australia, much time was wasted with further trans-shipping, and Chrobry, accompanied by HMS Vanoc got into Namsos just before sunrise on 17 April. In the rush to get away before the German bombers arrived, the soldiers landed without much of their kit but De Wiart got the troops dispersed before a reconnaissance aircraft arrived. De Wiart was not aware that the attack directly into Trondheimsfjord had been called off. Throughout his time at Namsos, he was left ignorant of what was happening elsewhere in Norway.

== French arrival ==
Two battalions of French Chasseurs Alpins (mountain troops) landed on 19 April under air attack. One of the transports conveying the French was too long to enter the harbour and returned to the United Kingdom without landing many of the French supplies, leaving the troops without straps for their skis or the mules they used for transport. The French stayed in Namsos, enduring air bombardment against which they had little protection. The French cruiser Émile Bertin was damaged by bombing during the disembarkation (no casualties) and was replaced by the French cruiser Montcalm (1935). About 6,000 Allied troops were put ashore. The French troops, for the most part, were not used in the short campaign because of a lack of supplies. Towards the end, they were engaged somewhat as the Allied troops fell back on Namsos, preparatory to evacuation.

== Clash in the south ==
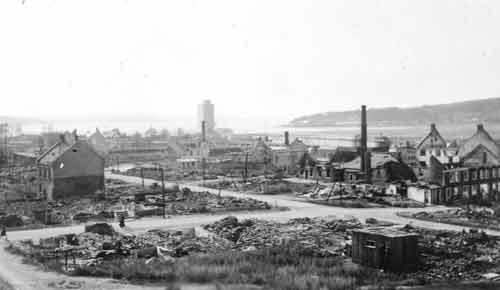
The bombed-out town of Steinkjer

By 21 April, British forces had advanced quickly as far south as the hamlet of Verdal, where road and railway bridges crossed the River Inna, a few miles inland from Trondheimsfjord. This was about halfway between Trondheim and Namsos, some miles down the fjord. They spotted a German gunboat, two armed trawlers and a destroyer in the fjord, on their flanks, well able to land troops behind them and direct fire at them, to which they lacked the means to respond.

When De Wiart landed at Namsos on 15 April, the Germans had about 1,800 troops in the Trondheim area, some in the city and some along the railway to Sweden. Their possession of the Værnes airfield enabled them to fly extra troops in daily, and by 18 April, they had 3,500 men in the area, the next day 5,000. They were generally well equipped but lacked field artillery. Some German troops were diverted to Hegra, where an improvised force of 251 Norwegians was holding out in Hegra Fortress an old border fort. They began pushing up the fjord and patrols reached Verdal on 16 April.

The Verdal bridge was defended by about 80 Norwegian soldiers, armed with Krag-Jørgensen rifles and Colt M/29 heavy machine guns. When the Germans attacked on the morning of 21 April, the Norwegians were supported by a section of Royal Engineers who happened to be in the area. For an hour and a half, this force held the German attack off. The majority of the British forces were a little further back. The Germans landed forces at several points behind them to outflank them, spotted by the main British force. Fearing being cut off, the Norwegians and Royal Engineers withdrew. A battle developed. The advantage was with the Germans, who were equipped with snowshoes and skis, sledge-mounted heavy mortars, and light field guns. They possessed air support from an airfield 35 miles away and had supporting naval gunfire. There was no panic among the British and Norwegian forces, and they succeeded in countering the first moves of the Germans. Heavy fighting occurred around the small village of Vist. The initial attacks were repelled, but the Germans outflanked the British positions on skis through the deep snow.

The Luftwaffe attacked and destroyed the British forward base at Steinkjer on 21 April, causing the loss of much of their supplies and destroying 242 houses, leaving over 1,800 Norwegian civilians homeless. Although 80% of the town was destroyed in the attack, there were no deaths in the bombing.

== Air attacks ==
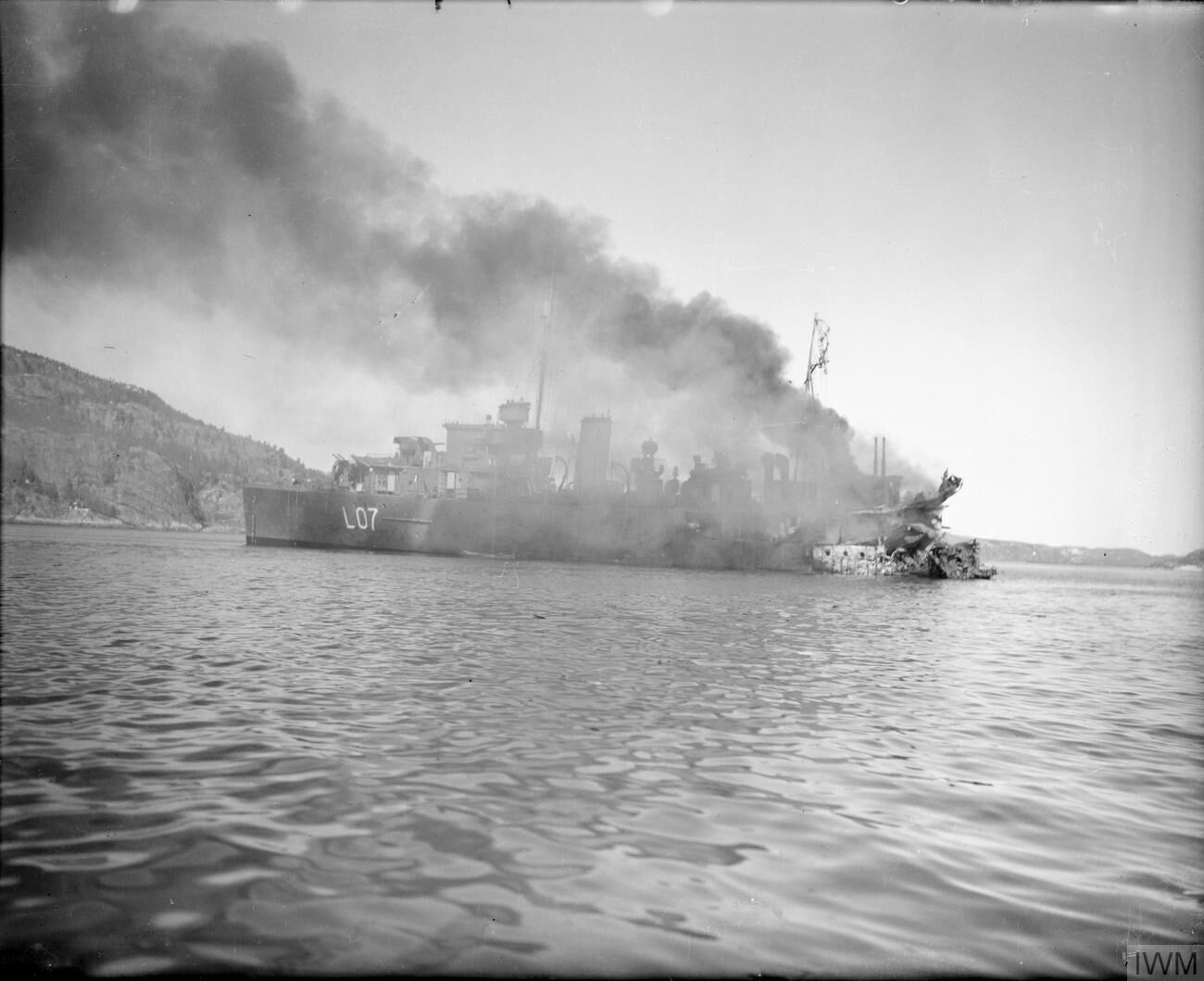
HMS Bittern ablaze in Namsos Fjord after having suffered a direct hit in the stern by an aerial bomb.

Allied troops examine an unexploded German bomb at Grong Station in April 1940

German bombers destroyed much of the wooden town of Namsos on 20 April. Attacks lasted throughout the day, and most of the houses, as well as the railway terminal, a church, the French headquarters and the two wooden wharves were burned. The stone wharf was damaged. The Norwegians paid dearly for the help the Allies had brought. Only one Allied ship was present in the harbour when the attack occurred. Fourteen German bombers went after the tiny anti-submarine trawler HMT Rutlandshire and badly damaged it just down the bay from Namsos. The ship was beached, and the survivors machine-gunned in the water. None were killed and only two injured. They were later rescued by the destroyer HMS Nubian, sister ship of HMS Afridi. Air attacks on Namsos continued throughout the campaign.

The British felt the need to provide protection from submarine attack for their ships entering and leaving Namsos. Lacking air cover, the small, slow anti-submarine sloops and trawlers used were very vulnerable to air attack. On 30 April, the sloop HMS Bittern was sunk by Junkers Ju 87 dive bombers off Namsos. On 1 May, three British anti-submarine trawlers at the entrance to the Namsfjord, HMS Gaul, HMS St. Goran and HMS Aston Villa were destroyed by aircraft, the latter managing to make it back to Namsos, where she burned. HMT Arab evacuated the crew of St. Goran. From 28 April to 2 May, Arab endured 31 air attacks; her captain, Richard Stannard, received the Victoria Cross for his actions during those five days.

The Norwegian Army Air Service and Royal Norwegian Navy Air Service had no units in the vicinity. The only Allied aircraft present were during the first British landings. A brief patrol was mounted well offshore by Gloster Gladiators, operating from the aircraft carrier HMS Glorious. They claimed three German aircraft shot down. Some eighteen Gladiators were flown off the Glorious and briefly operated from the frozen Lake Lesjaskogsvatnet at Lesjaskog, but these were too far south to help Namsos.

== Evacuation ==
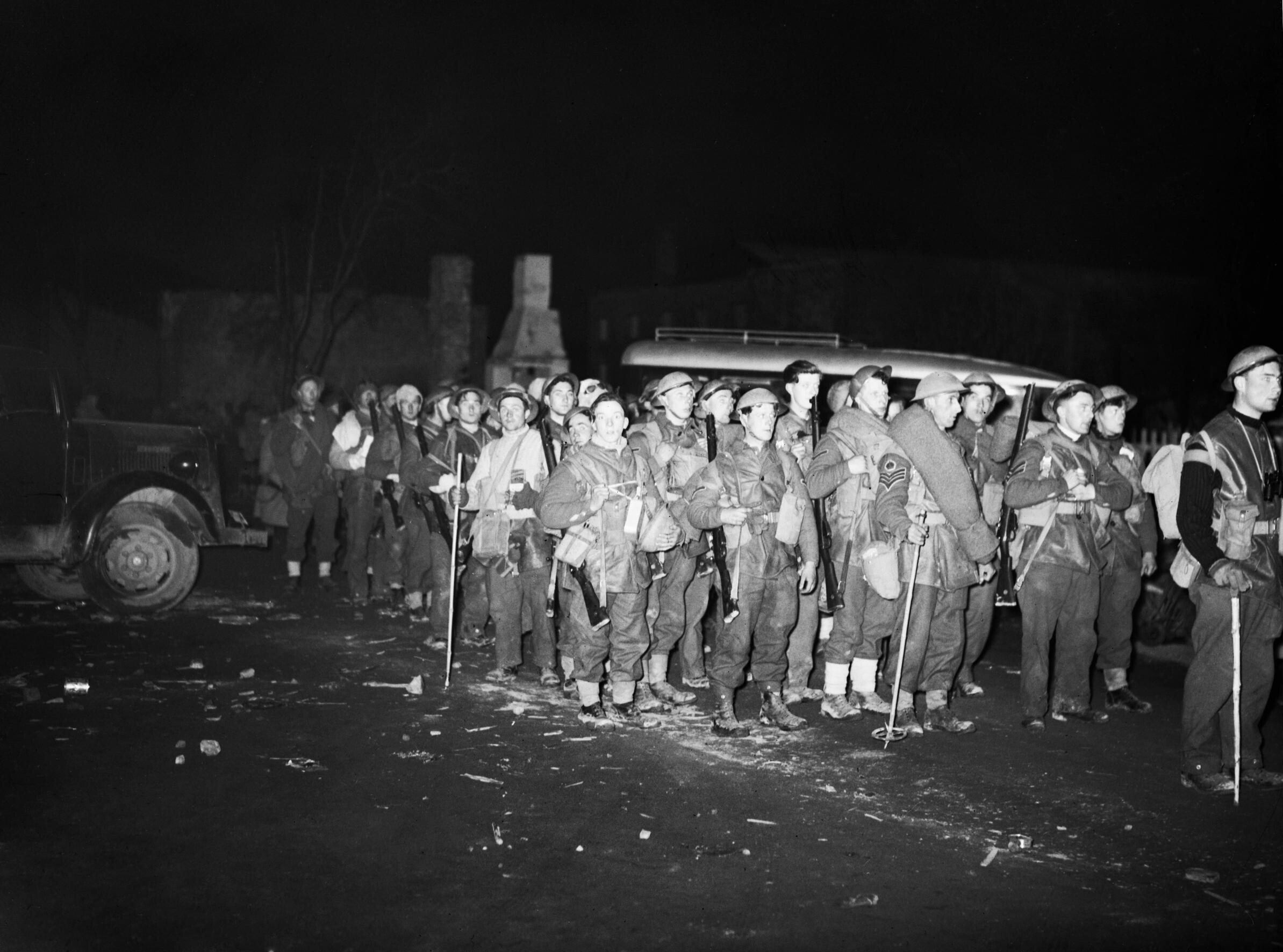
British troops gathered for evacuation from Namsos on 2 May 1940

De Wiart received orders on 28 April to evacuate Namsos, and on 29 April, an evacuation convoy of destroyers, three British and one French, left Scapa Flow in Scotland under the command of Lord Louis Mountbatten. A larger naval force followed at a distance to protect them against attack by German warships. They were bombed on 1 May as they crossed the North Sea. That evening, they encountered thick fog 40 miles short of their rendezvous point at Kya Lighthouse, which was 40 miles by sea from Namsos. Plans to evacuate that night had to be cancelled. Meanwhile, German troops were closing in on the rearguard in the hills outside Namsos, and the convoy ships were vulnerable to air attack if the fog lifted in daylight.

Rather than wait for the evening, Mountbatten took his ships in on 2 May, moving from fog bank to fog bank. This was a very dangerous enterprise on a rocky coast. Despite the fog, the ships were bombed. The ships' masts were sticking out above the fog, giving the German bombers an approximate target. When they reached Namsos, the fog lifted, revealing a burning town and swarms of German bombers. Since it would have been suicidal to enter in these conditions, the British ships ducked back into the fog and returned down the bay.

The next day, 3 May, the last possible for evacuation, dawned as foggy as before. Admiral John Cunningham, in command of naval forces in the area, screened the evacuation convoy with two cruisers and four destroyers at Kya Light and sent cruiser HMS York, five destroyers and three transports in. Mountbatten led in HMS Kelly at 26 knots as the sun was going down. When they rounded the last bend of the fjord, they saw Namsos on fire. Mountbatten at this point did not know if the Germans were in possession of the town. A burning anti-submarine trawler, HMS Aston Villa, lay just ahead. As he closed the wharves, Mountbatten could see that everything was ablaze. But De Wiart was there with 5,500 troops lined up in good order, waiting to get off.

Evacuation began at 10:30 p.m. Two of the transports were able to get alongside the damaged quay and embark troops. The destroyers took off the other men and ferried them to York and the third transport, before taking a last load themselves. Meanwhile, the rearguard was engaging the Germans to cover the evacuation. A tricky disengagement followed and a rush for the last ship, HMS Afridi. There was no time to destroy supplies left on the wharves, so Afridi shelled the equipment as she pulled away from Namsos at 2:20 a.m, 4 May. At 4:30 am the rear of the British convoy was sighted by German reconnaissance aircraft and bombers soon followed. The force was attacked continuously until late afternoon.

During the third attack of the day, the French destroyer Bison was hit in the forward magazine and exploded with 136 killed. The other destroyers turned back to pick up survivors who were being machine-gunned in the water. After the Afridi had picked up some of the French sailors and Allied soldiers, she was hit by two heavy bombs and capsized with the loss of a hundred men, including some of the rearguard and the wounded from the Bison. British anti-aircraft fire destroyed a number of German aircraft. The convoy reached Scapa Flow on 5 May, De Wiart's 60th birthday.

== See also ==
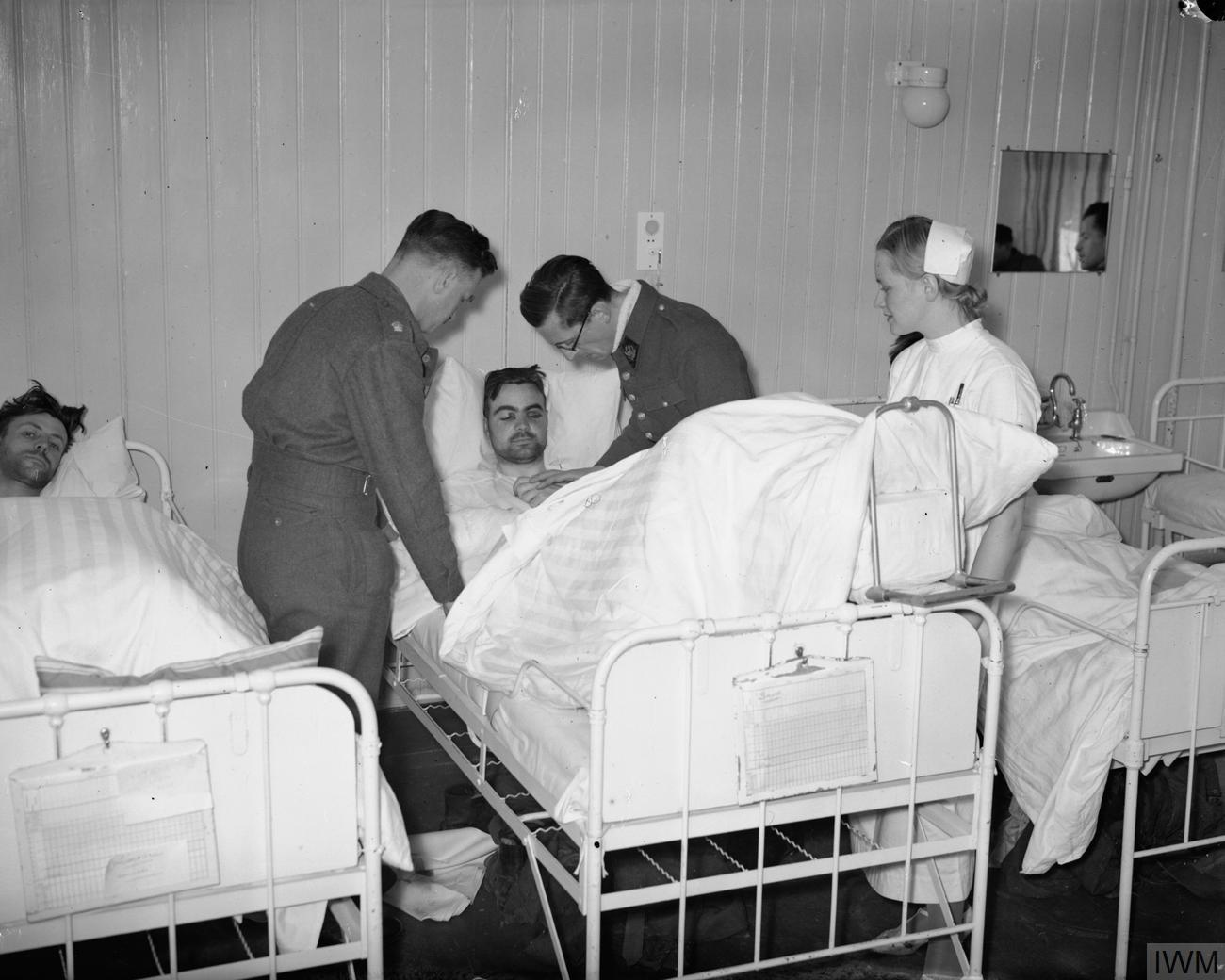
British and French medical officers and a Norwegian nurse care for British wounded in Namsos hospital, April 1940.

- List of British military equipment of World War II
- List of French military equipment of World War II
- List of Norwegian military equipment of World War II
- List of German military equipment of World War II

== Bibliography ==
- Buckley, Christopher (1977) [1952]. Norway, The Commandos, Dieppe. London: HMSO. ISBN 978-0-11-772194-4.
- Churchill, Winston S. (1961). The Second World War: The Gathering Storm. Vol. I. New York: Bantam Books.
- De Wiart, Adrian Carton (1950). Happy Odyssey: The Memoirs of Lieutenant-General Sir Adrian Carton de Wiart, with a Foreword by Winston S. Churchill. London: Jonathan Cape. OCLC 1161102433.
- Jackson, Robert (2001) [1972]. Before the Storm, The Story of Bomber Command, 1939 to 1942. London: Cassell Military. ISBN 978-0-304-35976-9.
- Kersaudy, François (1987). Norway 1940. New York: St. Martin's Press. ISBN 0-312-06427-6.
- Norway. Vol. II. London: Naval Intelligence Division. 1943. OCLC 632079079.
- Poolman, Kenneth (1980). HMS Kelly: The Story of Mountbatten's Warship. London: New English Library. ISBN 978-0-450-04784-8.
- Terraine, John (1988). The Right of the Line. Seven Oaks: Sceptre. ISBN 978-0-340-41919-9.
