= French destroyer Lion =

Destroyer of the French Navy

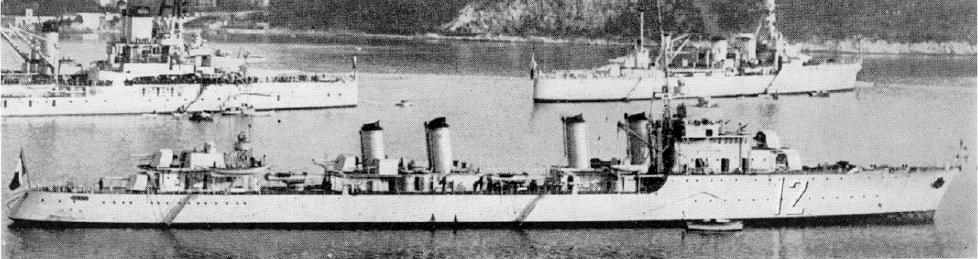
- Sister ship Guépard at anchor

History

France
- Name: Lion
- Namesake: Lion
- Builder: Ateliers et Chantiers de France
- Launched: 5 August 1929
- Captured: 27 November 1942
- Fate: Sunk by aircraft, 1944

General characteristics (as built)
- Displacement: 2,436 t (2,398 long tons) (standard); 3,220 t (3,170 long tons) (full load)
- Length: 130.2 m (427 ft 2 in)
- Beam: 11.5 m (37 ft 9 in)
- Draft: 4.3 m (14 ft 1 in)
- Installed power: 4 du Temple boilers; 64,000 PS (47,000 kW; 63,000 shp)
- Propulsion: 2 shafts; 2 geared steam turbines
- Speed: 35.5 knots (65.7 km/h; 40.9 mph)
- Range: 3,000 nmi (5,600 km; 3,500 mi) at 14.5 knots (26.9 km/h; 16.7 mph)
- Crew: 12 officers, 224 crewmen (wartime)
- Armament: 5 × single 138.6 mm (5.5 in) guns; 4 × single 37 mm (1.5 in) AA guns; 2 × triple 550 mm (21.7 in) torpedo tubes; 2 chutes; 4 throwers for 36 depth charges

Lion was one of six Guépard-class destroyers (contre-torpilleurs) built for the French Navy during the 1920s. Completed in 1931, the ship participated in the Second World War. After France surrendered to Germany in June 1940, Lion served with the navy of Vichy France. Her crew attempted to scuttle the ship, but failed when the German attempted to seize the French fleet in Toulon, France, on 27 November 1942. She later was repaired by the Regia Marina (Royal Italian Navy), but was scuttled to prevent her capture by the Germans when Italy surrendered in September 1943. The German salvaged the ship the following year, but it was sunk by Allied bombers later that year.

== Design and description ==
The Guépard-class ships were improved versions of the preceding Jaguar class. They had an overall length of 130.2 meters (427 ft 2 in), a beam of 11.5 meters (37 ft 9 in), and a draft of 4.68 meters (15 ft 4 in). The ships displaced 2,436 metric tons (2,398 long tons) at standard load and 3,220 metric tons (3,170 long tons) at deep load. Their crew consisted of 10 officers and 200 crewmen in peacetime and 102 officers and 224 enlisted men in wartime.

The ships were powered by two geared steam turbines, each driving a propeller shaft using steam provided by four du Temple boilers. The turbines were designed to produce 64,000 metric horsepower (47,000 kW; 63,000 shp) which was intended give the ships a speed of 35.5 knots (65.7 km/h; 40.9 mph). During her sea trials on 24 September 1930, Lion sustained a speed of 35.47 knots (65.69 km/h; 40.82 mph) from 66,258 PS (48,733 kW; 65,352 shp). The ships carried enough fuel oil to give them a range of 3,000 nautical miles (5,600 km; 3,500 mi) at 14.5 knots (26.9 km/h; 16.7 mph).

The main battery of the Guépard class consisted of five 138.6-millimeter (5.5 in) Modèle 1923 guns in single shielded mounts, one superfiring pair fore and aft of the superstructure and the fifth gun abaft the rear funnel. Their anti-aircraft armament consisted of four semi-automatic 37-millimeter (1.5 in) Modèle 1927 guns in single mounts positioned amidships. They were equipped with two rotating triple mounts for 550-millimeter (21.7 in) torpedo tubes, one mount between the two pairs of funnels as well as another aft of the rear funnel. A pair of depth charge chutes were built into their stern; these housed a total of sixteen 200-kilogram (440 lb) depth charges, with eight more in reserve. They were also fitted with four depth-charge throwers, two on each side abreast the forward pair of funnels, for which the ships carried a dozen 100-kilogram (220 lb) depth charges.
