= Sylvestre Gérard Audet =

French army general (1883–1972)

- Born: 18 February 1883; Senlis, France
- Died: 27 April 1972 (aged 89); Rennes, France
- Military career
- Allegiance: France
- Branch: French Army
- Service years: 1901–1942
- Rank: Général de corps d'armée
- Commands: 1st Moroccan Division; Corps expéditionnaire français en Scandinavie (CEFS); 25th Army Corps
- Conflicts: World War I World War II
- Awards: Legion of Honour; Croix de Guerre 1914–1918; Croix de Guerre 1939–1945

Sylvestre Gérard Audet (18 February 1883 – 27 April 1972) was a French Général de corps d'armée who commanded French forces during the Allied operations in Norway during World War II.

== Military career ==
Audet graduated from the École spéciale militaire de Saint-Cyr as part of the "Sud-Oranais" class (1901–1903). He served extensively in the French colonial infantry, specifically within the Tirailleurs units in North Africa and Indochina. He held various staff positions during the interwar period and was promoted to brigadier general in 1937. At the beginning of World War II he commanded the 1st Moroccan Division of French Armée d'Afrique

== Norwegian Campaign ==
In April 1940, Audet was placed in command of the Corps expéditionnaire français en Scandinavie (CEFS). His mission was to support the Allied effort to reclaim the vital iron-ore port of Narvik. Under his direction, the 1re Division Légère de Chasseurs, including the 13th Demi-Brigade of the French Foreign Legion, conducted amphibious landings and mountain warfare around the city, successfully capturing Narvik on 28 May 1940. However, the deteriorating situation in the Battle of France forced the Allies to withdraw from Norway, with Audet overseeing the evacuation of French troops in early June 1940.

== Later life ==
Following the Armistice of 22 June 1940, he served in the Vichy France military, where he was appointed as the commander of French forces in Tunisia and later served as the commander of the 17th Military Division in Toulouse. He retired from active service in 1942 and died in April 1972. He is interred in his family vault in Rennes.

== Decorations ==
- (France) Legion of Honour (Decree of 31 July 1941)
- (France) Croix de Guerre 1914–1918
- (France) Croix de Guerre 1939–1945
- (France) Croix de guerre des théâtres d'opérations extérieures
