= Italian frigate Carlo Margottini =

Carlo Margottini has been borne by at least two ships of the Italian Navy in honour of Carlo Margottini and may refer to:

- Italian frigate Carlo Margottini (F 595), a Bergamini-class frigate launched in 1960 and stricken in 1988.
- Italian frigate Carlo Margottini (F 592), a Bergamini-class frigate launched in 2013.
