= Carlo Margottini =

Italian naval officer (1899–1940)

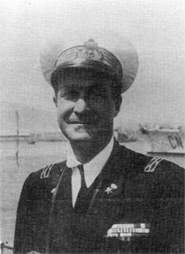
- Born: 19 January 1899; Rome, Lazio, Italy
- Died: 12 October 1940 (aged 41); Mediterranean Sea
- Military career
- Allegiance: Kingdom of Italy
- Branch: Regia Marina
- Service years: 1913–1940
- Rank: Capitano di Vascello (Captain)
- Commands: Aegean Submarine Group; Fiume (heavy cruiser); Artigliere (destroyer); 11th Destroyer Squadron
- Conflicts: World War I; Spanish Civil War; Battle of Mallorca; World War II; Battle of Calabria; Battle of Cape Passero †
- Awards: Gold Medal of Military Valor (posthumous)

Carlo Margottini (19 January 1899 – 12 October 1940) was an Italian naval officer during World War II.

== Biography ==
Margottini was born in Rome in 1899, and attended the Italian Naval Academy from 1913 to 1916, graduating with the rank of ensign. He participated in the First World War, first serving on the battleship Conte di Cavour, then on the scout cruiser Nibbio and on torpedo boats. In May 1917 he was promoted to sub-lieutenant and in November 1918 to lieutenant, becoming aide to Admiral Enrico Millo, governor of Dalmatia. In 1927 he was promoted to lieutenant commander and in 1933 to commander; he was given command of the Aegean Submarine Group and later of a torpedo boat squadron.

In 1936 he participated in the London Naval Conference, as a military expert, on behalf of the Italian government. During the Spanish Civil War, in command of the heavy cruiser Fiume, he participated in the occupation of Ibiza and Mallorca and contributed to the political and military reorganization of Balearic Islands, being awarded the Knight's Cross of the Military Order of Savoy. On returning from the Spain, he was promoted to captain and appointed Naval Attache in Paris.

At the outbreak of World War II, Margottini was the commanding officer of the 11th Destroyer Squadron, with flag on the destroyer Artigliere. On 9 July 1940 he participated in the Battle of Calabria, where he led his Squadron in a gun and torpedo attack on the British fleet, receiving for this action the Bronze Medal of Military Valor. In the following months he carried out several missions from Messina and Augusta. On 11 October 1940, he took to the sea with the ships of his squadron to carry out a night search for a British naval force reported in the Sicilian Channel, in cooperation with ships of the 1st Torpedo Boat Squadron.

In the night engagement that followed, the 1st Torpedo Boat Squadron and the 11th Destroyer Squadron attacked separately, one after another, the British light cruiser Ajax. The first attack was carried out by the torpedo boats, but was unsuccessful and resulted in the loss of the torpedo boats Ariel and Airone; shortly thereafter, the destroyers of the 11th Squadron attacked, but they found their enemy already on the alert. After sighting Ajax at 01:40, Artigliere attacked the opponent by launching a torpedo (which missed) and firing two 100 mm salvoes (that hit the cruiser, wrecking a 100 mm mount, the radar and the compass). Ajax quickly returned fire, however, and hit Artigliere several times within a few minutes, starting a large fire in the bow, knocking out most of the machinery and armament, and killing or wounding over half of the crew. Captain Margottini was mortally wounded and died shortly thereafter at his command post on the bridge, while inciting his crew to fight on; his squadron assistant, Lieutenant Corrado Del Greco, was also killed. Both officers were posthumously awarded the Gold Medal of Military Valor.

Artigliere was sunk later on that morning by the heavy cruiser HMS York, after an aborted towing attempt by her sistership Camicia Nera.

The Marina Militare has named two ships after Carlo Margottini: the Bergamini-class frigate Carlo Margottini (F 595), in service from 1962 to 1988, and the FREMM multipurpose frigate Carlo Margottini (F 592) completed in 2014.
