= Action off Cape Passero =

1940 battle of World War II

- Part of the Battle of the Mediterranean of the Second World War
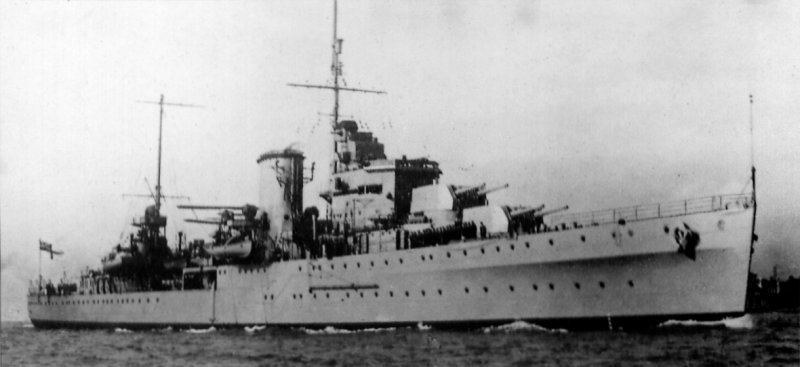
- The light cruiser HMS Ajax
Date	12 October 1940
Location	Off Cape Passaro, Mediterranean Sea 36°15′N 15°45′E
Result	British victory

Belligerents
United Kingdom	Italy

Commanders and leaders
Edward McCarthy	Carlo Margottini †; Alberto Banfi

Strength
Night action: 1 light cruiser; Day action: 1 heavy cruiser; 2 light cruisers	4 destroyers; 3 torpedo boats

Casualties and losses
13 killed; 22 wounded; 1 light cruiser damaged	296 killed; 1 destroyer sunk; 2 torpedo boats sunk; 1 destroyer damaged

The Action off Cape Passero, was a naval engagement in the Second World War between the British light cruiser HMS Ajax, three torpedo boats and seven destroyers of the Italian Regia Marina, in the central Mediterranean, to the south-east of Sicily, on the night of 11/12 October 1940.

In Operation MB 6, the Mediterranean Fleet covered Convoy MF 3 from Alexandria to Malta and Convoy MF 4 from Malta to Alexandria. Supermarina had prepared the Strait of Sicily Device (Dispositivo del Canale di Sicilia) with torpedo boats, MAS (Motoscafo armato siluranti, torpedo-armed motorboats), minefields and submarines against ships trying to pass the Sicilian Narrows at night.

The Dispositivo was implemented on the night of 11/12 October and ships were sent to the east of Malta in case the British returned to Alexandria. Three torpedo boats and four destroyers attacked the cruiser Ajax which suffered minor damage. Two torpedo boats were sunk and several torpedo boats and destroyers were damaged.

The next morning, Artigliere, a damaged destroyer, was sunk by HMS York. Supermarina was dismayed by the superiority of the British in night-fighting against some of their best ships and crews. On 13 October, Illustrious, with escorts, detached from the Mediterranean Fleet towards the Dodecanese and its Swordfish bombed the Italian airfield on Leros.

== Background ==
=== Operation MB 6 ===
The covering force for Convoy MF 3 (Alexandria to Malta) and Convoy MF 4 (Malta to Alexandria), comprised HMS Warspite (flagship, Vice-Admiral Sir Andrew Cunningham) Valiant, Malaya and Ramillies, the aircraft carriers HMS Eagle and Illustrious, the cruisers HMS York, Gloucester and Liverpool of the 3rd Cruiser Squadron and HMS Ajax, Orion and HMAS Sydney of the 7th Cruiser Squadron, with the destroyers HMS Dainty, Decoy, Defender, Hyperion, Havock, Hero, Hasty, Hereward, Ilex, Imperial, Jervis, Janus, Juno, Nubian, Stuart, HMAS Vampire, Vendetta, HMAS Voyager, Waterhen and Wryneck.

==== Convoy MF 3 ====
In early October, four merchant ships that had sailed the long route to Alexandria from Britain via the Cape of Good Hope, Clan Macauley (10,492 GRT, Clan Ferguson (7,347 GRT), Lanarkshire (8,167 GRT) and Memnon (7,506 GRT) had arrived. Chosen for their similarities in tonnage and speed, each had been loaded in Britain by the Sea Transport Division of the Ministry of War Transport with a selection of stores for Malta, to prevent the sinking of one ship depriving Malta of a class of cargo. Convoy MF 3 (Malta Fast 3) sailed on 8 October, with a close escort of the anti-aircraft cruisers HMS Calcutta and Coventry with the destroyers Stuart, Voyager, Wryneck and Waterhen. The convoy arrived at Malta on 11 October, bad weather having prevented the Italian fleet from sailing. Some damage was suffered by the destroyer Imperial with the Mediterranean Fleet on a mine and it was towed into Grand Harbour by Decoy.

== Prelude ==
=== Convoy MF 4 ===
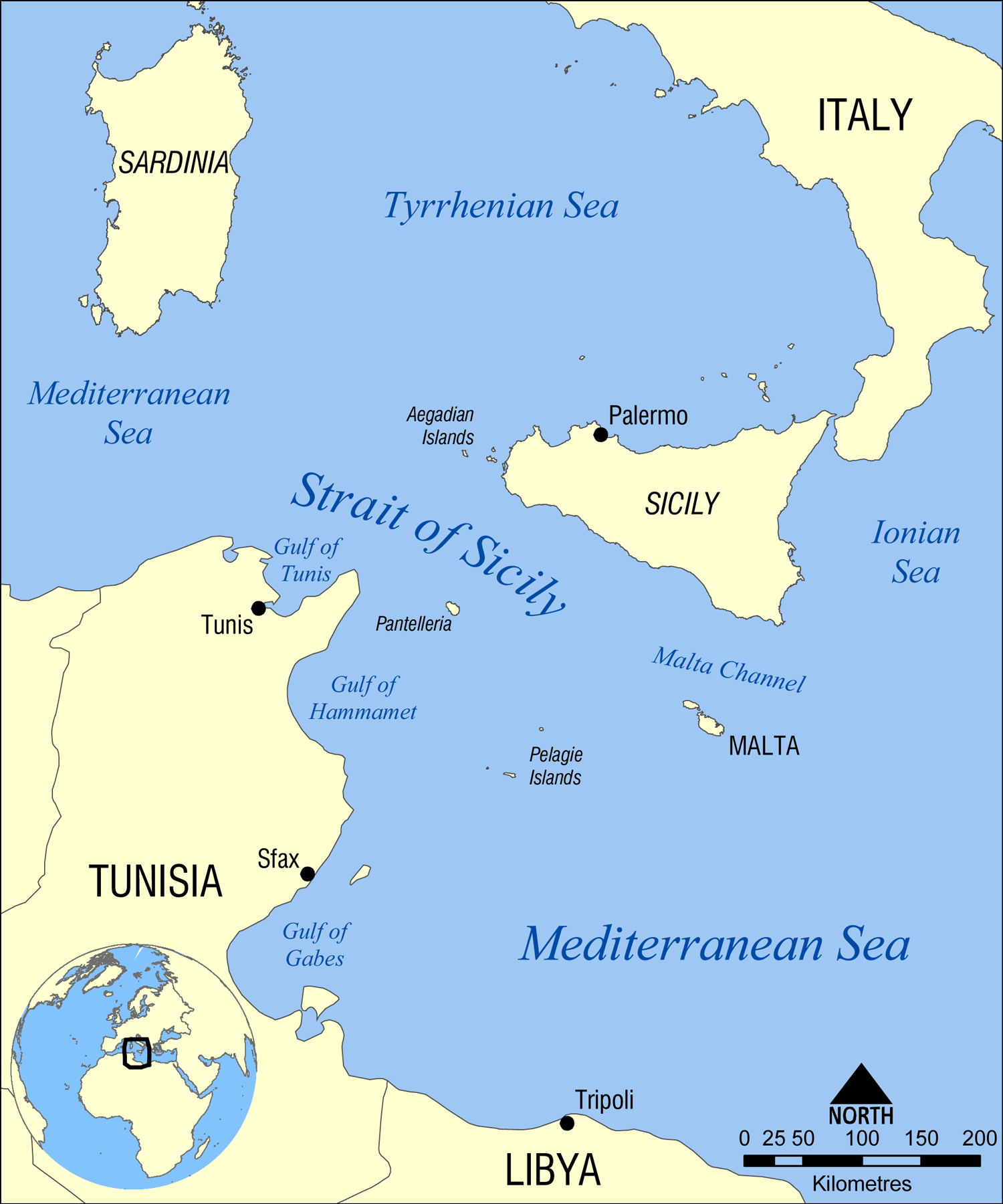
The Strait of Sicily

Convoy MF 4 comprised Volo (1,587 GRT), the Leaf-class tanker RFA Plumleaf (5,916 GRT) from Convoy MF 2 and the gunboat HMS Aphis departed Malta at 10:30 p.m. on 11 October for the return journey to Alexandria. The main body of the Mediterranean Fleet had waited to the south of Malta and the 7th Cruiser Squadron formed a line to sweep to the north-east. The light cruiser, Ajax, the northernmost ship in the line was sailing a zig-zag at about 17 kn (31 km/h; 20 mph), 100 nmi (190 km; 120 mi) to the east of Malta.

=== The Strait of Sicily device ===
An Italian civilian aircraft spotted the Mediterranean Fleet about 100 nmi (190 km; 120 mi) south-east of Malta, to the surprise of the Italian naval headquarters, Supermarina, which remained dubious as no other aircraft reported any sightings. As a precaution, Supermarina implemented the Dispositivo del Canale di Sicilia the (Strait of Sicily Device) a plan to attack ships passing the Sicilian Narrows at night with torpedo boats, MAS (Motoscafo armato siluranti, torpedo-armed motorboats), minefields and submarines. A force of destroyers was sent to Cape Bon, in case the British warships were going west to Gibraltar.

It was too late for the Italian battlefleet to operate against the convoy but cruiser divisions at Palermo and Messina were ordered to raise steam as a precaution, the Regia Aeronautica was notified and traffic with North Africa was suspended. Three MAS sailed from Augusta, Sicily to patrol off Malta, the 1st Torpedo Boat Squadron, with the Spica-class torpedo boats Airone (flagship, Capitano di Corvetta Alberto Banfi) Alcione and Ariel and the nearby 11th Destroyer Squadron with the Soldati-class destroyers Artigliere (flagship, Capitano di Vascello Carlo Margottini), Camicia Nera, Aviere and Geniere were sent to patrol to the east of Malta, between 35° 45'N and 35° 25'N.

== Actions ==
=== Night 11/12 October ===
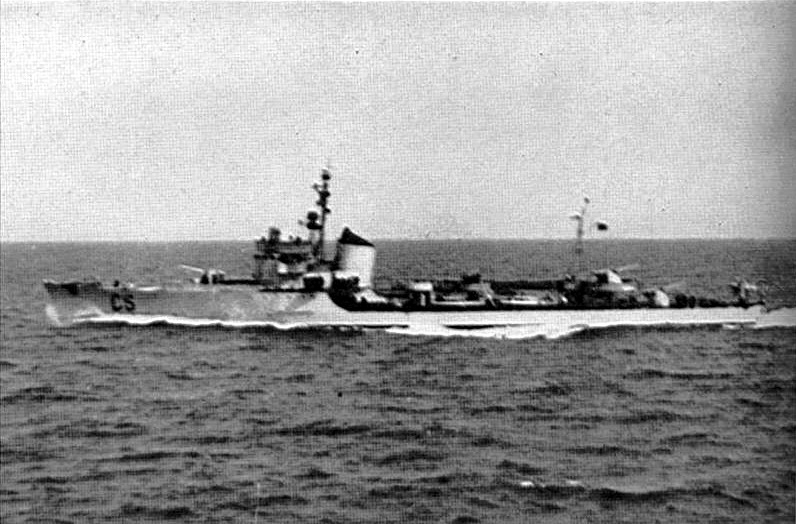
Cassiopea, an example of a Spica-class torpedo boat

The Italian torpedo boats sailed westwards at 17 kn (31 km/h; 20 mph) in rake formation, about 8,000 yd (3.9 nmi; 7.3 km) apart. The 11th Destroyer Squadron was also in rake formation 8 nmi (15 km; 9.2 mi) south of Ariel, Geniere to the north with Aviere, Artigliere and Camicia Nera in line to the south. At 01:37, Ajax was sighted by Alcione, steaming eastward, 19,600 yd (9.7 nmi; 17.9 km) away on the port side. At 01:48, the three torpedo boats were closing on the British cruiser at full speed, the British unaware of the approach. At 01:57, Alcione fired two torpedoes from a range of 1,900 yd (1,700 m). Captain Banfi, commander of the Italian formation, ordered the flagship Airone to open fire on the cruiser with her 100 mm (3.9 in) guns, followed by her sister ships. Two rounds hit the bridge and the third 6 ft (1.8 m) below the waterline.

Ajax returned fire on Ariel the nearest torpedo boat, while at full speed. Ariel was shattered by the salvos and sank twenty minutes later, although she may have been able to fire a torpedo. Captain Mario Ruta, his second in command and most of the crew were killed. Airone was the next Italian ship to be hit. She managed to launch two torpedoes before being disabled, catching fire almost immediately, the bridge and upper deck were swept by machine-gun fire by Ajax at short range and sank a few hours later; Banfi was among the survivors. Alcione, the only undamaged Italian warship, broke contact at 02:03.

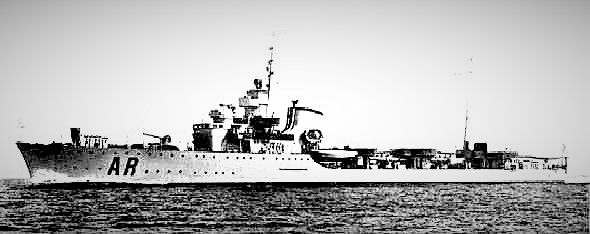
The destroyer Artigliere

After its manoeuvres during the fighting, Ajax resumed course to the eastward. At 02:15, her fire-control radar detected two Italian destroyers. Margottini had sighted the firing from the south but a wireless failure prevented Margottini from making a simultaneous attack, when three of his destroyers had headed north-west, instead of north as ordered. Aviere was battered by a sudden broadside from the British cruiser, forestalling a torpedo attack and was forced to withdraw southwards, severely damaged. Artigliere managed to fire a torpedo and four 120 mm (4.7 in) gun salvos at 2,800 yd (1.4 nmi; 2.6 km) before being hit and crippled. The torpedo missed but four rounds struck two of Ajax's secondary gun turrets, destroyed her port whaler and disabled her radar. After firing at Camicia Nera and missing, Ajax broke off the action.

=== 12–14 October ===
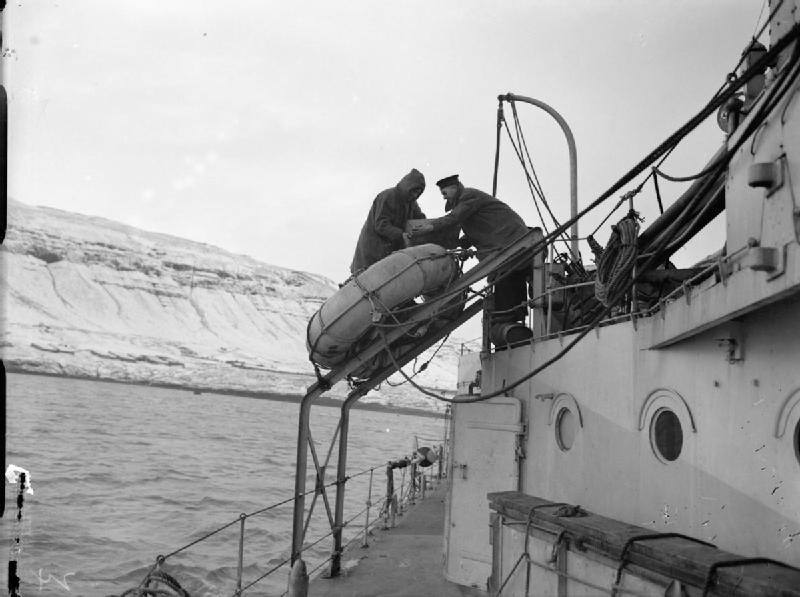
Example of a Carley float on its launch rails

The survivors on Artigliere, all of whose officers but the chief engineer had been killed, managed to extinguish the fires and get a boiler going but after an hour, the lack of feed water for the boiler left Artigliere stranded again. Camice Nere took Artigliere in tow and Supermarina sent the 3rd Cruiser Division, comprising the Trento-class cruisers Trieste, Trento and Bolzano, from Messina at 08:00 but they were too late to rescue Artigliere. A Sunderland flying-boat from Malta found the Italian ships and directed three Swordfish torpedo-bombers from Illustrious to attack them but they achieved no result.

At first light, the cruisers York (Captain Richard Portal) Gloucester and Liverpool arrived to find Artigliere adrift, Camicia Nera having slipped the tow and left. The survivors on Artigliere abandoned ship at 36° 30'N, 16° 07'E and after York sank the ship with gunfire, Carley floats were dropped near the survivors. (Note: Woodman wrote that the destroyer Havock had been severely damaged by bombing, when rescuing survivors from Bartolomeo Colleoni in July; Portal decided not to stop. Gill (1957), Woodman (2003) and Smith (2009) describe the ship being sunk by gunfire; O'Hara (2009) wrote that the gunfire missed and that the wreck was sunk by a torpedo.) Cunningham sent a signal in clear giving the position of the survivors (to the annoyance of London) and the hospital ship Aquileja rescued about 225 survivors. The Regia Aeronautica made several bombing raids on the Mediterranean Fleet as it sailed eastwards and accidentally attacked Italian ships.

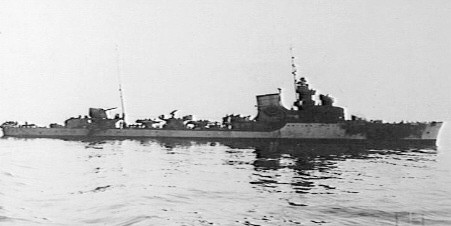
Soldati-class destroyer Artigliere

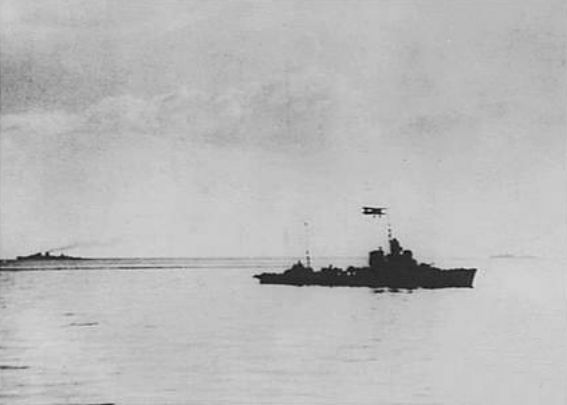
Artigliere, with HMS Orion and HMAS Sydney in the background, the morning after the engagement.

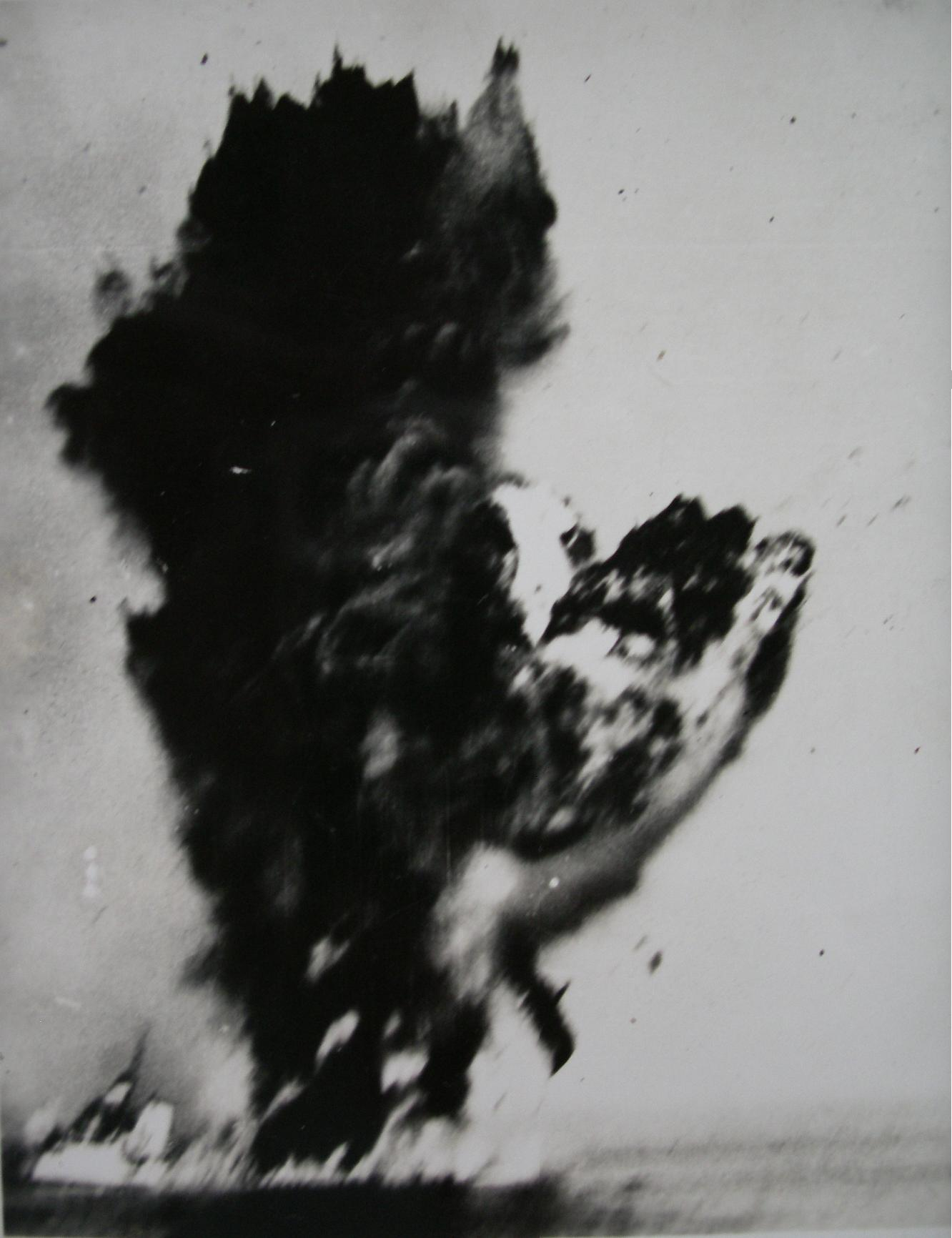
Artigliere is sunk by gunfire from York on the morning of 12 October.

== Aftermath ==
=== Analysis ===
In 1957, Marcantonio Bragadin, a historian and former admiral of the Regia Marina, wrote that the reports of the action gave Supermarina pause, because Ajax had received only superficial damage from the hits achieved by Airone and Ariel in exchange for the loss of two torpedo boats and a destroyer. The Italian ships were considered to be some of the best in the Regia Marina with some of the best ship captains. The ships had been fought bravely, a matter noted by the British but inferiority in night-fighting ability had undone them. Bragadin also wrote that Ajax carried radar, a matter in which the Italians were unaware until the Battle of Cape Matapan the following year. The Italians concluded that poor Italian air surveillance had prevented a quick reaction by the Italian battlefleet, handing the tactical advantage to the British of avoiding contact in unfavourable conditions.

In 1998, Greene and Massignani wrote that the action was the first time that the Regia Marina encountered the superior skill and equipment of the British in night actions. The extensive use of star shells, searchlights and incendiary rounds by the British had to be countered if the Italians were to close the technical gap. They also suspected that the British had radar. Supermarina concluded that

Every progress in this field will be of paramount importance and perhaps the most important element to organise will be to co-ordinate the employment of searchlights and flares shells from the outset of the action.

In 2009, Vincent O'Hara wrote that the torpedo boats had sprung a surprise on the British and had been able to launch their torpedoes at very short range but missed Ajax. McCarthy had manoeuvred his ship with "promptitude, ability and great determination" but the weapons and tactics used by the Italians had benefited the British, with the exception of the Italian flashless powder, which did not affect their night vision like the non-flashless powder used by the British. Banfi had achieved 'a brilliant approach' but his ships carried only six torpedoes, less than the capacity of one British destroyer. Having defeated the torpedo boats, the Italian destroyers failed to concentrate and presented themselves one at a time, silhouetted by the moon. Although some of the Italian ships achieved hits on Ajax, the destructive power of a 3.9-inch [30 lb (14 kg)] or a 4.7-inch [51 lb (23 kg)] shell was far less than that of the 6-inch [112 lb (51 kg)] guns of Ajax.

=== Casualties ===
Ajax suffered thirteen men killed and 22 wounded. The cruiser fired 490 of its 6-inch shells and four torpedoes. The damage to the superstructure was repaired and Ajax returned to service on 5 November. Almost all of the crew of Ariel was killed. The approach of a Malta-bound convoy attracted the attention. The Fulmar and Sea Gladiator fighters of the Fleet Air Arm on board the aircraft carriers, shot down two SM.79bis, a Z.506B and damaged several bombers without loss.

=== Subsequent operations ===
On 14 October, Swordfish from Illustrious bombed an Italian airfield on Leros in the Dodecanese, claiming hits on hangars, fuel dumps and workshops. During the evening twilight, Italian torpedo-bombers attacked the fleet and hit the cruiser Liverpool, blowing off its bows. The ship was taken in tow by Orionand after 100 nmi (190 km; 120 mi) the tow parted; after reconnecting it, the wreckage of the bows fell into the sea, making the tow much easier.

== Orders of battle ==
=== Convoy MF 3 ===
Alexandria to Malta
Ship	Year	Flag	GRT	Notes
SS Clan Ferguson	1938	Merchant Navy	7,347	
SS Clan Macauley	1936	Merchant Navy	10,492	
SS Lanarkshire	1936	Merchant Navy	8,167	Cameron-class steamship
MV Memnon	1930	Merchant Navy	7,506	

=== Convoy MF 4 ===
Malta to Alexandria
Ship	Year	Flag	GRT	Notes
HMS Aphis	1915	Royal Navy	—	Insect-class gunboat
RFA Plumleaf	1917	United Kingdom	5,916	Tanker
SS Volo	1938	United Kingdom	1,587	Freighter

=== Convoy escort forces ===
Operation MB 6
Ship	Flag	Type	Notes
Close escort
HMS Calcutta	Royal Navy	C-class cruiser	Anti-aircraft cruiser, 8–13 October
HMS Coventry	Royal Navy	Town-class cruiser	Anti-aircraft cruiser, 8–13 October
HMAS Stuart	Royal Navy	Scott-class destroyer	8–11 October, refitted at Malta
HMS Voyager	Royal Navy	V-class destroyer	8–11 October, MF 3 only
HMAS Waterhen	Royal Navy	W-class destroyer	8–13 October
HMS Wryneck	Royal Navy	W-class destroyer	8–13 October
Distant escort (Mediterranean Fleet)
HMS Eagle	Royal Navy	aircraft carrier	
HMS Illustrious	Royal Navy	Illustrious-class aircraft carrier	
HMS Malaya	Royal Navy	Queen Elizabeth-class battleship	1st Battle Squadron
HMS Ramillies	Royal Navy	Revenge-class battleship	1st Battle Squadron
HMS Valiant	Royal Navy	Queen Elizabeth-class battleship	1st Battle Squadron
HMS Warspite	Royal Navy	Queen Elizabeth-class battleship	Flagship 1st Battle Squadron
HMS Ajax	Royal Navy	Leander-class cruiser	7th Cruiser Squadron
HMS Orion	Royal Navy	Leander-class cruiser	7th Cruiser Squadron
HMAS Sydney	Royal Navy	Leander-class cruiser	7th Cruiser Squadron
HMS Gloucester	Royal Navy	Town-class cruiser	3rd Cruiser Squadron
HMS Liverpool	Royal Navy	Town-class cruiser	3rd Cruiser Squadron
HMS York	Royal Navy	York-class cruiser	3rd Cruiser Squadron
HMS Nubian	Royal Navy	Tribal-class destroyer	
HMS Dainty	Royal Navy	D-class destroyer	
HMS Decoy	Royal Navy	D-class destroyer	
HMS Defender	Royal Navy	D-class destroyer	
HMS Hyperion	Royal Navy	H-class destroyer	
HMS Havock	Royal Navy	H-class destroyer	
HMS Hero	Royal Navy	H-class destroyer	
HMS Hasty	Royal Navy	H-class destroyer	
HMS Hereward	Royal Navy	H-class destroyer	
HMS Ilex	Royal Navy	I-class destroyer	
HMS Imperial	Royal Navy	I-class destroyer	
HMS Jervis	Royal Navy	J-class destroyer	
HMS Janus	Royal Navy	J-class destroyer	
HMS Juno	Royal Navy	J-class destroyer	
HMAS Vampire	Royal Navy	V-class destroyer	
HMS Vendetta	Royal Navy	V-class destroyer	Remained at Malta to refit until 9 November

=== Regia Marina ===
Ships involved in the attack on HMS Ajax and the Dispositivo de Canale di Sicilia (Strait of Sicily Device).
Ship	Flag	Type	Notes
11th Destroyer Squadron
Artigliere	Regia Marina	Soldati-class destroyer	Flag, Captain Carlo Margottini, sunk
Camicia Nera	Regia Marina	Soldati-class destroyer	
Aviere	Regia Marina	Soldati-class destroyer	
Geniere	Regia Marina	Soldati-class destroyer	
1st Torpedo Boat Squadron
Airone	Regia Marina	Spica-class torpedo boat	Flag, Capitano di Corvetta Alberto Banfi, sunk
Alcione	Regia Marina	Spica-class torpedo boat	
Ariel	Regia Marina	Spica-class torpedo boat	Sunk
Dispositivo del Canale di Sicilia
3 MAS	Regia Marina	MAS (motorboat)	Patrol, east of Grand Harbour
Destroyers	Regia Marina	—	Patrol off Cape Bon
