= Italian frigate Virginio Fasan =

Virginio Fasan has been borne by at least two ships of the Italian Navy in honour of Virginio Fasan and may refer to:

- Italian frigate Virginio Fasan (F 594), a Bergamini-class frigate launched in 1960 and stricken in 1988.
- Italian frigate Virginio Fasan (F 591), a Bergamini (2011)-class frigate launched in 2012.
