= York-class cruiser =

Class of British heavy cruisers

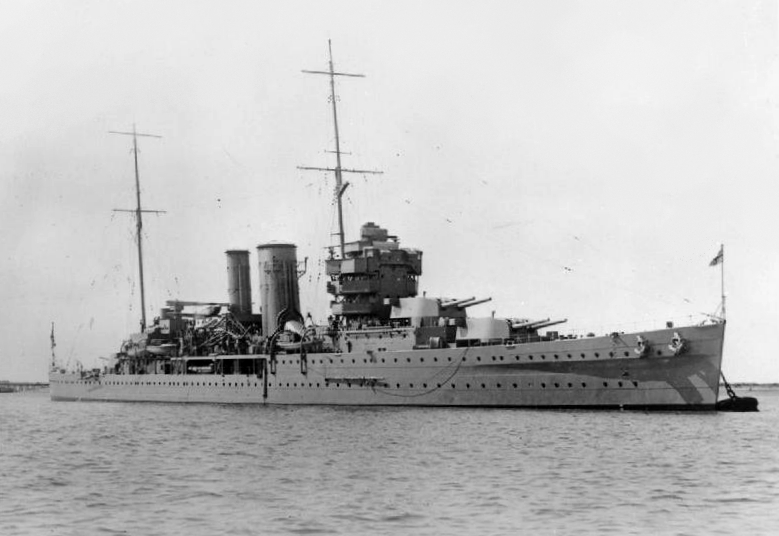
- HMS York

Class overview
- Name: York class
- Builders: HM Dockyard, Devonport; Palmers Shipbuilding & Iron Co.
- Operators: Royal Navy
- Preceded by: County class
- Succeeded by: None
- Built: 1927-1931
- In commission: 1930-1942
- Planned: 7
- Completed: 2
- Cancelled: 5
- Lost: 2

General characteristics - York
- Type: Heavy cruiser
- Displacement: 8,250 tons standard / 10,350 tons full load
- Length: 540 ft (160 m) p/p; 575 ft (175 m) o/a
- Beam: 57 ft (17.4 m)
- Draught: 17 ft (5.2 m)
- Propulsion: Eight Admiralty 3-drum water-tube boilers; Parsons geared steam turbines; 80,000 shp (59,700 kW) on four shafts
- Speed: 32.25 knots (59.73 km/h) (30.25 knots (56.02 km/h) full load)
- Range: 1,900 tons oil fuel; 10,000 nmi (20,000 km) at 14 knots (26 km/h)
- Complement: 623
- Armament: 6 × BL 8 inch Mk.VIII (203 mm, L/50) guns, twin mounts Mk.II; 6 × QF 4 inch Mk.V (102 mm, L/45) guns, single mounts HA Mk.III; 8 × 0.5 inch Mk.III Vickers (12.7 mm, L/50) machine guns, quad mounts Mk.I; 6 (2x3) tubes for 21 inch (533 mm) torpedoes
- Armour: Main belt; 3 in; 2 1/2-1 in enclosing bulkheads; Lower deck; 1 1/4 in over machinery; 1 1/2 in over steering gear; Magazine box citadels 4–1 in; Transmitting Station 1 in; Turrets; 1 in face, rear, crown; 2 1/2 in base; 1 in barbette; 2 in hoist
- Aircraft carried: One × Fairey Seafox
- Aviation facilities: rotating catapult

General characteristics - Exeter
- Displacement: 8,390 tons standard / 10,410 tons full load
- Beam: 58 ft (17.7 m)
- Complement: 630
- Armour: as York, except; Magazine box citadels 5–1 in
- Aircraft carried: Two x Fairey Seafox, later Supermarine Walrus
- Aviation facilities: Two fixed catapults
- Notes: Other characteristics as per York

The York class was the second and final class of heavy cruisers built for the Royal Navy under the terms of the 1922 Washington Naval Treaty. They were essentially a reduced version of the preceding County class, scaled down to enable more cruisers to be built from the limited defence budgets of the late 1920s.

It was initially planned to build seven ships of this class, though in the end only two were constructed—HMS York, started in 1927, and HMS Exeter, started in 1928. Exeter differed in appearance from York because of late changes in her design. The remaining ships were delayed due to budget cuts, and then following the London Naval Treaty of 1930 the Royal Navy decided its cruiser needs were best met by building a greater number of yet smaller cruisers with 6–in guns.

While both ships served extensively in the first few years of the Second World War, it was Exeter that had the more notable career. Exeter took part in the Battle of the River Plate against the German raider Admiral Graf Spee, and was badly damaged, though later she was repaired and modernized. She escorted a convoy to the Pacific in late 1941, and was again heavily damaged in the Battle of the Java Sea, then caught and overwhelmed a few days later by four Japanese heavy cruisers. York was sunk in Souda Bay, Crete, by Italian MT boats in 1941, and was raised in 1952 and towed away to be scrapped in Italy.

== Design ==
The design of the class was led by Charles Lillicrap, RCNC. The Royal Navy had a need for smaller cruisers than his County class, the largest design possible under the Washington limits, in order that more could be built under the strict defence economies of 1920s Britain. From 1925 the Royal Navy planned a "Class B" cruiser (as against the 10,000-ton cruisers of Class A, such as the Counties.)

The new design was to have a displacement of 8,500 tons, as opposed to the 10,000 tons of the County class. This weight saving was mainly to be accomplished by reducing the armament to six 8-in guns (as opposed to the 8 guns on the County class), and also by using a new Mark II mounting for the guns. Otherwise the new ships were to share all the main features of the preceding class.

=== Propulsion ===
The economies in size allowed for a 50-foot (15 m) reduction in length and 9 feet (3 m) in beam over the Counties. Their engines were identical - four boilers in two boiler rooms providing steam for four Parsons geared turbines, generating 80,000 shaft horsepower. The design speed was 32.5 knots (60.2 km/h), one knot faster than the County class.

=== Protection ===
The armour of the York-class was slightly inferior to the preceding County class heavy cruisers, which included a 3-inch-thick (76 mm), 8-foot-deep (2 m) main belt and an armoured lower deck joining at its top edge. Over the magazine spaces, the belt thickened to 4 inches (100 mm), and the armour extended above the belt, with a 2.5-inch (64 mm) magazine crown The turrets had 2-inch (51 mm) armour to the face and crown, 1.5 inches (38 mm) on sides and rear, and the barbettes on which the turrets sat had 1-inch (25 mm) armour. The transmitting station was also covered by 1-inch armour. To shorten the belt length, the amidship magazine found on the Counties was removed (reduced armament required less magazine space anyway). This armour scheme was generally equivalent to that of the County class, though thicker over the machinery spaces.

=== Armament ===
The six 8-inch (203 mm) Mark VIII guns were mounted in three turrets. York used the Mark II mounting, which was intended to be 20 tons lighter than the Mark I mounting used on the earlier County-class ships; however, in fact it turned out to be heavier. The Mark II mounting was capable of firing at up to 80 degrees elevation for anti-aircraft barrage fire. However, this feature, which was also shared with the Mark I mounting, turned out to produce more mechanical headaches than were justified by its very marginal military utility. Exeter used a modified Mark II* mounting, limited to 50 degrees elevation.

The secondary armament consisted of four 4-inch (102 mm) QF Mark V guns and two 2-pounder guns. Two triple 21-inch (533 mm) torpedo tubes were carried. This was similar to the County class, with the exception that the Yorks carried two fewer torpedo tubes, because of the narrower beam.

=== Appearance ===
As a result of the magazine changes, and to keep the funnels distant from the bridge, only two funnels were required; the forward boiler room uptakes trunked up into a large fore-funnel. This was raked in York to clear the flue gases from the bridge, but was straight in Exeter owing to an altered bridge design and more extensive trunking. To maintain homogeneity of appearance, York stepped raked masts and Exeter vertical ones. York had a tall "platform" style bridge as seen in the Counties, which was somewhat distant from 'B' turret. This was because it had been intended to fit a catapult and floatplane to the roof of the turret, which needed clearance distance and required a tall bridge to provide forward view. The roof of the turret, however, was not sufficiently strong to carry this catapult and it was never fitted. Exeter was ordered two years later and the bridge was redesigned in light of this, being lower, further forward and fully enclosed, as later seen in the Leander and Arethusa classes.

York eventually received a rotating catapult amidships behind the funnels, and Exeter had a fixed pair in the same location, firing forwards and angled out from the centreline. A crane for recovery was located to starboard and one aircraft could be carried on York, initially a Fairey Seafox (two on Exeter) and later, on Exeter, two Supermarine Walrus.

Compared to the Counties, the Yorks saved 1,750 tons in net weight, but the reductions in cost of £250,000 and manpower of 50 was something of an uneconomical saving.

== Ships ==
Construction data
Name	Pennant	Builder	Laid down	Launched	Completed	Fate
York	90	Palmers Shipbuilding & Iron Company, Jarrow	16 May 1927	17 Feb 1928	6 June 1930	Scuttled following sustained attacks by Italian explosive boats, 22 May 1941; salvaged and scrapped, February 1952
Exeter	68	HM Dockyard, Devonport	1 August 1928	13 July 1929	31 July 1931	Sunk by Japanese ships in the Java Sea, 1 March 1942

== Service history ==
=== York ===
York saw various peacetime patrol duties during the interwar period, before partaking in World War II. She saw convoy escorting duties, before intercepting the German blockade runner Skagerrak, who scuttled herself before she could be captured. Although York did not directly participate in the Battle of Cape Passero, she partook in the aftermath of the engagement where she sank the disabled and abandoned Italian destroyer Artigliere.

York was attacked in March 1941 by Italian explosive motorboats and hit amidships and then beached to prevent her sinking. York's beached wreck was then bombed beyond repair by German warplanes and abandoned after her main guns had been made useless.

=== Exeter ===
Again, Exeter partook in various peacetime patrol duties before the events of the 2nd World War. Alongside the light cruisers Ajax and Achilles, Exeter took part in the Battle of the River Plate to sink the German cruiser Admiral Graf Spee. Exeter partook in a flanking maneuver to distract Graf Spee so that Ajax and Achilles could sneak attack the German cruiser, and she paid the price for this. Several 283 mm (11.1-inch) shells from the pocket battleship slammed into Exeter, leaving her heavily listing and with only her aft 8-inch (203 mm) gun turret operational, as well as wiping out half of her torpedo crews, her spotting aircraft, and communication systems. Once Ajax and Achilles joined the fight, prompting Graf Spee to target them, the crippled Exeter fled the scene, but not before scoring a decisive hit with her main guns that knocked out Graf Spee's fuel processing plant, ensuring that she would not make it back to Germany.

After a year of repairs, she was sent to the far east to hold back Japanese forces, surviving numerous attacks by air bombers from the Japanese light carrier Ryūjō. Following that, Exeter participated in the Battle of the Java Sea in February of 1942, where her luck ran out. She quickly lost a gunfight with the Japanese heavy cruiser Haguro, causing practically no damage to Haguro while being hit by numerous 8-inch (203 mm) shells from the cruiser, one of which blew up half of her engine and limited her to 5 knots, forcing her to withdraw from the engagement. Two days later, the crippled Exeter alongside the destroyers USS Pope and HMS Encounter ran into Haguro again, supported by her three sisterships, Nachi, Myōkō, and Ashigara. Exeter was hit by numerous 8-inch (203 mm) shells, the first of which blew up the rest of her engines and left her dead in the water, which resulted in her scuttling. She sank at 13:30.

== Bibliography ==
- Campbell, N.J.M. (1980). "Great Britain". In Chesneau, Roger (ed.). Conway's All the World's Fighting Ships 1922–1946. New York: Mayflower Books. pp. 2–85. ISBN 0-8317-0303-2.
- Campbell, John (1985). Naval Weapons of World War Two. Annapolis, Maryland: Naval Institute Press. ISBN 0-87021-459-4.
- Colledge, J. J.; Warlow, Ben (2006) [1969]. Ships of the Royal Navy: The Complete Record of All Fighting Ships of the Royal Navy from the 15th Century to the Present (3rd Rev ed.). London: Chatham Publishing. ISBN 978-1-86176-281-8. OCLC 67375475.
- Friedman, Norman (2010). British Cruisers: Two World Wars and After. Barnsley, UK: Seaforth Publishing. ISBN 978-1-59114-078-8.
- Lenton, H. T. (1998). British & Empire Warships of the Second World War. Annapolis, Maryland: Naval Institute Press. ISBN 1-55750-048-7.
- Marriott, Leo. Treaty Cruisers: The first international warship building competition. Pen & Sword Maritime, Barnsley, 2005. ISBN 1-84415-188-3
- Raven, Alan & Roberts, John (1980). British Cruisers of World War Two. Annapolis, Maryland: Naval Institute Press. ISBN 0-87021-922-7.
- Rohwer, Jürgen (2005). Chronology of the War at Sea 1939–1945: The Naval History of World War Two (Third Revised ed.). Annapolis, Maryland: Naval Institute Press. ISBN 1-59114-119-2.
- Whitley, M. J. (1995). Cruisers of World War Two: An International Encyclopedia. London: Cassell. ISBN 1-86019-874-0.
