= Richard Bevan (Royal Navy officer) =

British naval officer

Sir Richard Bevan KBE CB DSO MVO DL
- Born: 10 July 1885; France
- Died: 10 May 1976 (aged 90); Minchinhampton, Gloucestershire
- Military career
- Allegiance: United Kingdom
- Branch: Royal Navy
- Service years: 1900–1935; 1939–1945
- Rank: Rear Admiral
- Commands: HMS Whitby Abbey; HMY Victoria and Albert (1899); York; HMS Mercury (shore establishment)
- Conflicts: First World War; Second World War
- Awards: Knight Commander of the Order of the British Empire; Companion of the Order of the Bath; Distinguished Service Order; Member of the Royal Victorian Order; Legion of Honour (France); Order of the Nile (Egypt); Legion of Merit (United States)

Rear Admiral Sir Richard Hugh Loraine Bevan, KBE, CB, DSO, MVO, DL (10 July 1885 – 10 May 1976) was a British Royal Navy officer of the First World War and inter-war period.

== Early life ==
Bevan was born in France, the son of Eustace B.L. Bevan, an officer Royal West Kent Regiment, and Mary Hill, and he was educated at Stubbington House School. He attended the Britannia Royal Naval College and gained a commission in 1901.

== Career ==
As a young naval officer he served on HMS Implacable, HMS Drake and HMS Aboukir. He was promoted to sub-lieutenant on 30 July 1904. After completing a course at the Signal School, he served on RMS Medina during the Royal Family's 1911–12 visit to India for the Delhi Durbar. Between 1913 and March 1918 Bevan served on the staff of Admiral Sir Rosslyn Wemyss on HMS Orion. He was promoted to lieutenant commander on 31 December 1914. He saw active service during the Gallipoli Campaign, during which he landed at Cape Helles as officer in charge of signal stations during the occupation of the peninsular. Bevan was present at the evacuation of Suvla Bay and Anzac Cove, and he was awarded the Distinguished Service Order for his leadership during the withdrawal. He was also mentioned in dispatches. in On 25 January 1918 he was awarded the Legion of Honour, and he was mentioned in dispatches for a second time in 1919 for his actions against enemy submarines in the Adriatic. He was also awarded the Order of the Nile (4th Class) on 21 June 1919.

On 9 March 1918 Bevan received his first command as captain of HMS Whitby Abbey. In 1921 he was Commander of the Royal Yacht, HMY Victoria and Albert, and on 13 August 1923 he was made a Member of the Royal Victorian Order for his services to the Royal Family. On 31 August 1923 he was promoted to the rank of captain. Between 1924 and 1926 Bevan served as chief of staff to the Commander-in-Chief, Cape of Good Hope Station, before working as Naval Attaché to the British diplomatic missions in Athens and Rome until 1931.

From December 1931 to January 1934 he was Commanding Officer of HMS York, before serving as Commander of HM Signal School, Portsmouth (HMS Mercury). In March 1935 he became Naval Aide-de-camp to George V, before retiring from the Royal Navy on 26 August 1935 with the rank of rear admiral.

Following the outbreak of the Second World War, Bevan rejoined the Royal Navy in 1939. Between February 1940 and Italy's declaration of war on Britain in June of that year, Bevan was Naval Attaché in Rome. From 1941 to 1942 he was Senior British Naval Officer, North Russia, before serving as Flag Officer-in-Charge (Belfast) until July 1945. He was made a Companion of the Order of the Bath in the 1942 Birthday Honours, and knighted as a Knight Commander of the Order of the British Empire in the 1946 New Year Honours. He was awarded the Legion of Merit on 16 July 1946.

After retiring from the navy for a second time, Bevan served as a Deputy Lieutenant for Gloucestershire in 1946, and became a County Councillor for the county in 1949. He was made a County Alderman in 1952.

== Personal life ==
In 1934 he married Frances Anne Beckford, the only surviving daughter of Algernon Beckford of Bury St Edmunds.
