= Italian frigate Carlo Margottini (F 592) =

FREMM class multi-purpose frigates in the Italian Navy

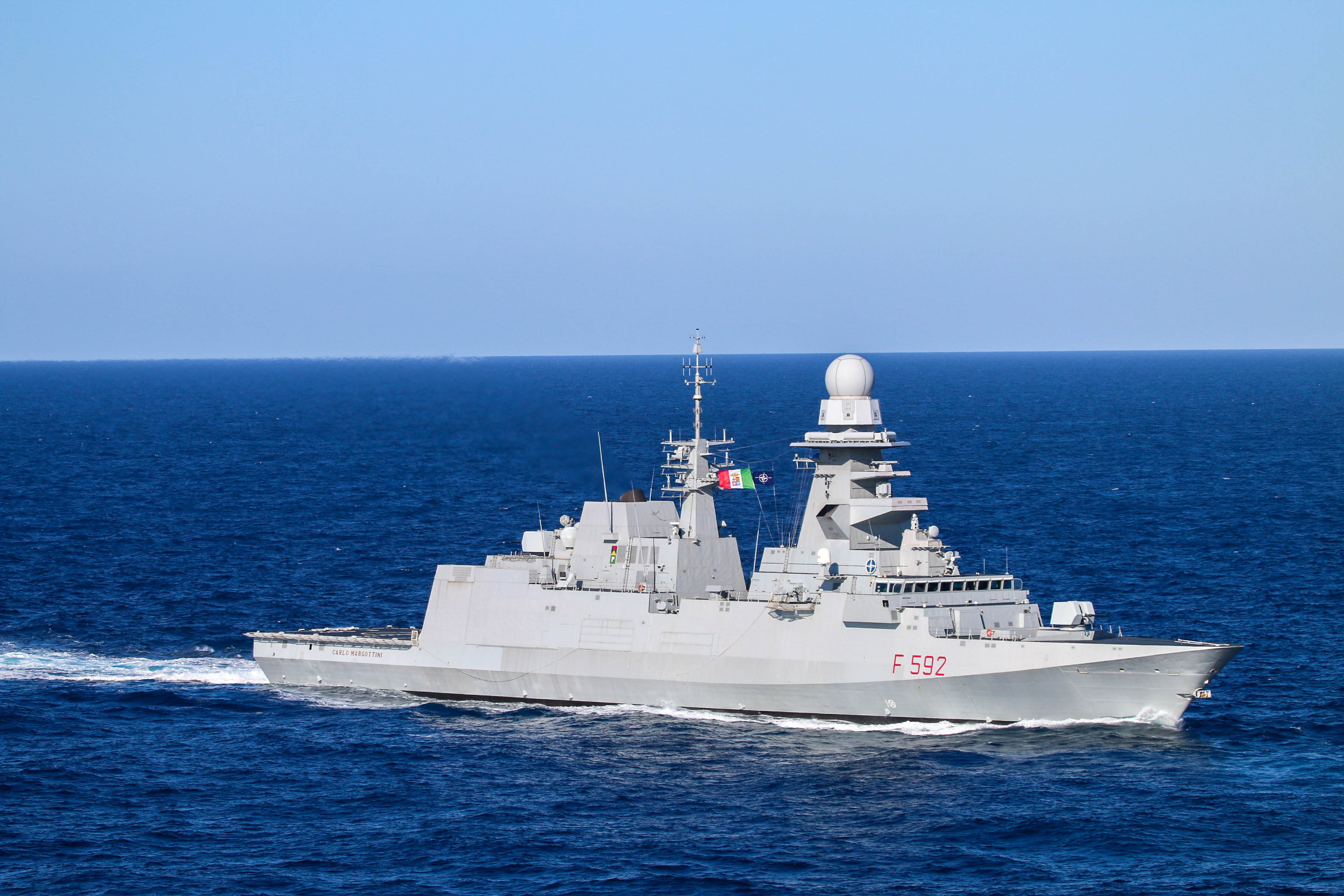
- Carlo Margottini on 2 January 2022

History

Italy
- Name: Carlo Margottini
- Namesake: Carlo Margottini
- Builder: Fincantieri, Riva Trigoso and Muggiano
- Laid down: 21 April 2010
- Launched: 29 June 2013
- Commissioned: 27 February 2014
- Home port: La Spezia
- Identification: MMSI number: 247321300; Callsign: IBOI; Pennant number: F 592
- Motto: Per undas ad hostem; (To the enemy through the waves)
- Status: Active

General characteristics
- Class & type: Carlo Bergamini-class frigate
- Displacement: 6,700 tons
- Length: 144.6 m (474.4 ft)
- Beam: 19.7 m (64.6 ft)
- Draught: 8.7 m (28.5 ft)
- Propulsion: CODLAG; 1 × 32 MW gas turbine General Electric/Avio LM2500+G4; 2 × 2.5 MW electric motors Jeumont Electric; 4 × diesel generators; VL 1716 (T2ME series by 2,15 MW everyone, on first two frigate; HPCR series by 2,8 MW everyone, since the third frigate); 2 × shafts, driving controllable pitch propellers; 1 × 1 MW bow thruster
- Speed: 30 knots (56 km/h; 35 mph); max cruise speed 17 knots (31 km/h; 20 mph)
- Range: 6,800 nmi (12,600 km; 7,800 mi) at 15 knots (28 km/h; 17 mph)
- Complement: 201
- Sensors & processing systems: Leonardo Kronos Grand Naval (MFRA) Active electronically scanned array radar; CAPTAS-4 towed-array sonar; UMS 4110 CL hull-mounted sonar
- Armament: 16-cell MBDA SYLVER A50 VLS for 16 MBDA Aster 15 and 30 missiles; 1 × Leonardo Otobreda 127/64 Vulcano; 2 × Leonardo OTO Melara 76/62 mm Davide/Strales CIWS guns; 2 × Leonardo Oto Melara/Oerlikon KBA 25/80 mm remote weapon systems; 4 × MBDA Teseo Mk-2/A anti-ship and land attack missiles; 4 × MBDA MILAS anti-submarine missiles; 2 x triple Leonardo (WASS) B-515/3 launcher for MU 90 torpedoes; 2 x SITEP MASS CS-424 acoustic guns
- Aircraft carried: 2 × SH90; 1 × SH90; 1 × AW101 (armed with MU 90 torpedoes or MBDA Marte Mk2/S missiles)
- Aviation facilities: Double hangar

Carlo Margottini (F 592) is a Carlo Bergamini-class frigate of the Italian Navy. Which in turn were developed by the FREMM multipurpose frigate program.

== Development and design ==
Planning assumptions for the Italian Navy are 10 FREMM-IT (4 ASW variants and 6 GP variants) at a cost of €5.9 billion. FREMM-IT will replace the Maestrale and Lupo-class frigates in service with the Italian Navy. In the 2013 Italian budget, the Italian government laid out the necessary financing for two more GP variants (FREMM-IT 7 & 8) and the contract was awarded in September 2013. On 15 April 2015, the Italian Parliament confirmed the deal between OCCAR and Orizzonte Sistemi Navali Spa (Fincantieri and Finmeccanica, since 2017 Leonardo) to begin building units 9 and 10, for 764 million Euros.

As of 16 April 2015, the Italian government has approved funding for all ten FREMM-IT to be delivered to the Italian Navy (4 ASW variants and 6 GP variants).

FREMM-IT 9 & 10 will have undisclosed enhanced capabilities. All 10 Italian FREMM-ITs have extended AAW capabilities, with SAAM-ESD CMS, Aster 30 and Aster 15 missiles for extended area defence. SAAM-ESD CMS use Leonardo MFRA, a 3D active radar (AESA), an evolved version of the Leonardo EMPAR PESA radar (previously embarked on Horizon-class destroyers and the aircraft carrier Cavour). Since the 7th FREMM-IT, there will be updates, such as new conformal IFF antenna and much more stealth response. Since the 9th FREMM-IT, SCLAR-H replaced with Leonardo ODLS-20. In 2017 the Italian FREMM refit started with the installation on each of 2 SITEP MS-424 acoustic guns.

In 2020 it was reported that Italy would sell its last two FREMM-class frigates in the current production line (Spartaco Schergat and Emilio Bianchi) to Egypt. Spartaco Schergat was in the final stage of her sea trials while Emilio Bianchi would follow within one year. The deal reportedly also involved other military equipment and was worth 1.2 billion Euros. It was reported that Italy would then order two additional FREMM frigates to replace those transferred to Egypt with the anticipated delivery of the replacements by 2024.

== Construction and career ==
On 29 June 2013, the launching ceremony of the ship took place at the Fincantieri plants in La Spezia, in the presence of the Chief of Defense, General Biagio Abrate, of the Undersecretary of Defense Senator Roberta Pinotti, the Chief of Defense Staff Admiral Luigi Binelli Mantelli, the Chief of Staff of the Navy team admiral Giuseppe De Giorgi, various representatives of ANMI with the national team admiral president Paolo Pagnottella and about 30 members of the former crews of the previous Margottini. The line-up of honor of the ceremony included the war flag of the Divers and Raiders Group, the medal table of the Navy and the banner of the Blue Ribbon (Province of Genoa), the banners of the Liguria Region, the province of Genoa and the Municipality of Sestri Levante. The ship's christening was conducted by Mrs. Stefania Portaccio, niece of military hero Carlo Margottini, after whom the ship is named.

Carlo Margottini took part in a Passage Exercise with INS Trishul (F43) of the Indian Navy before the latter called at Port of Civitavecchia, Italy on 25 October.

== Gallery ==
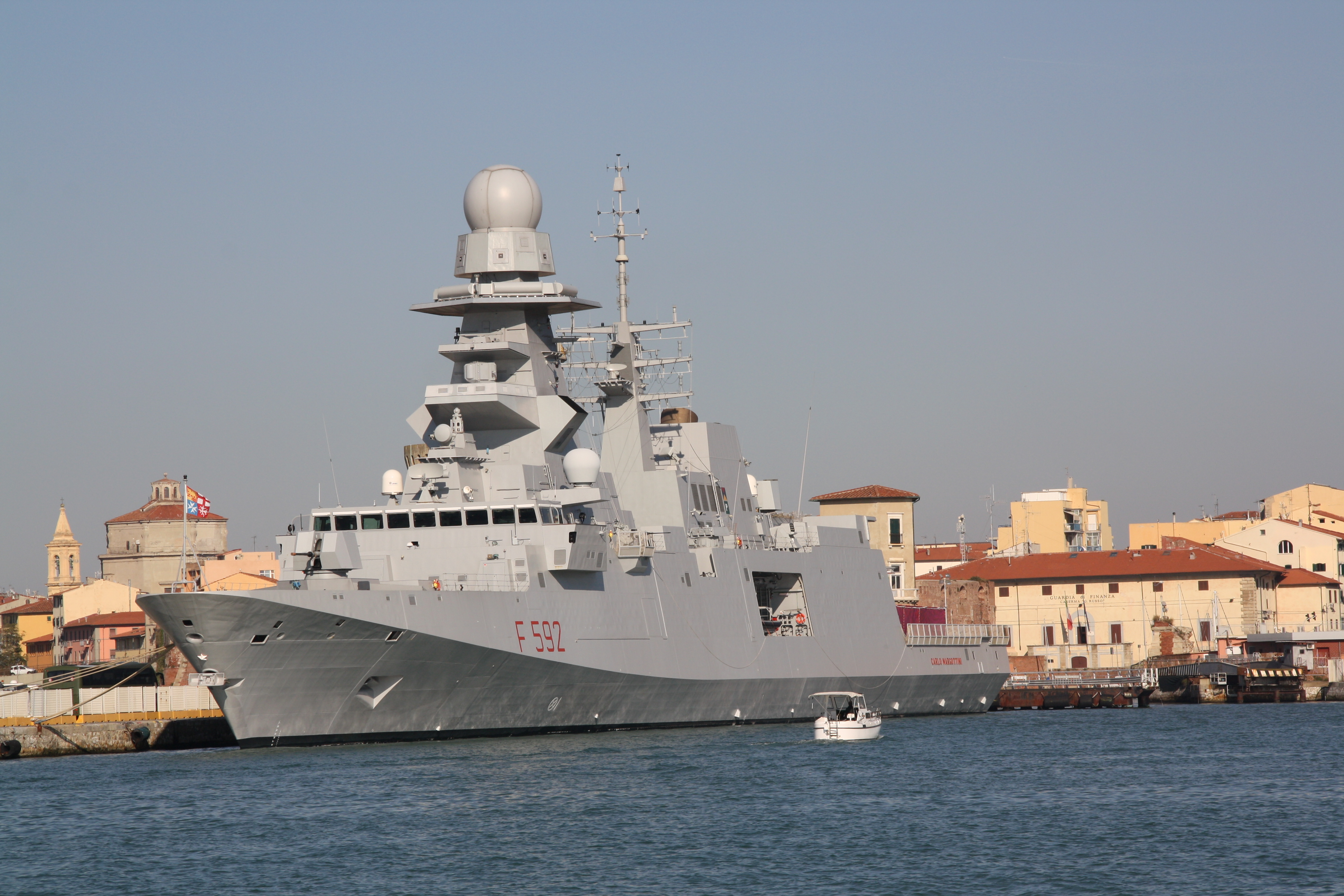
Carlo Margottini at Livorno on 27 September 2014.

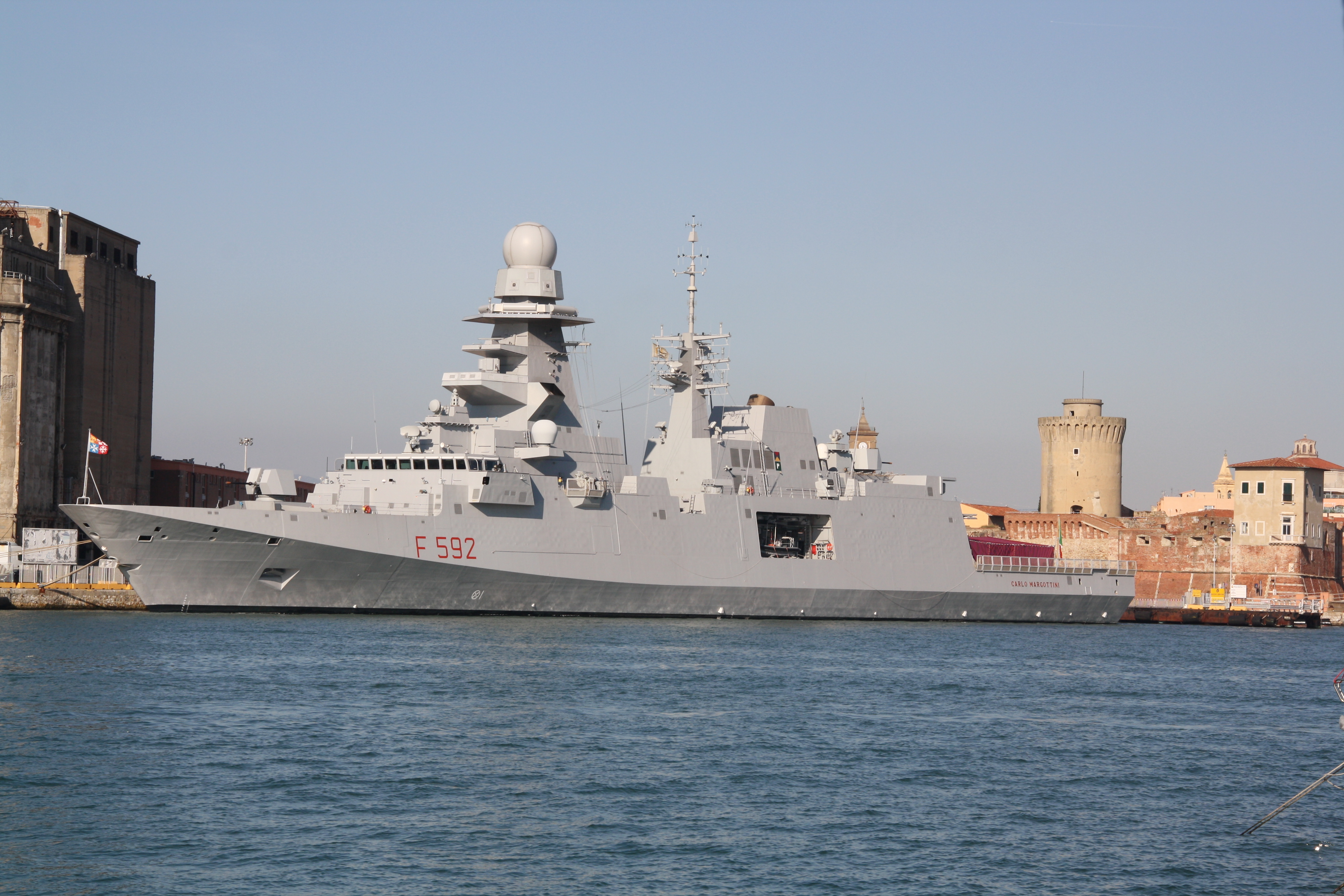
Carlo Margottini at Livorno on 27 September 2014.

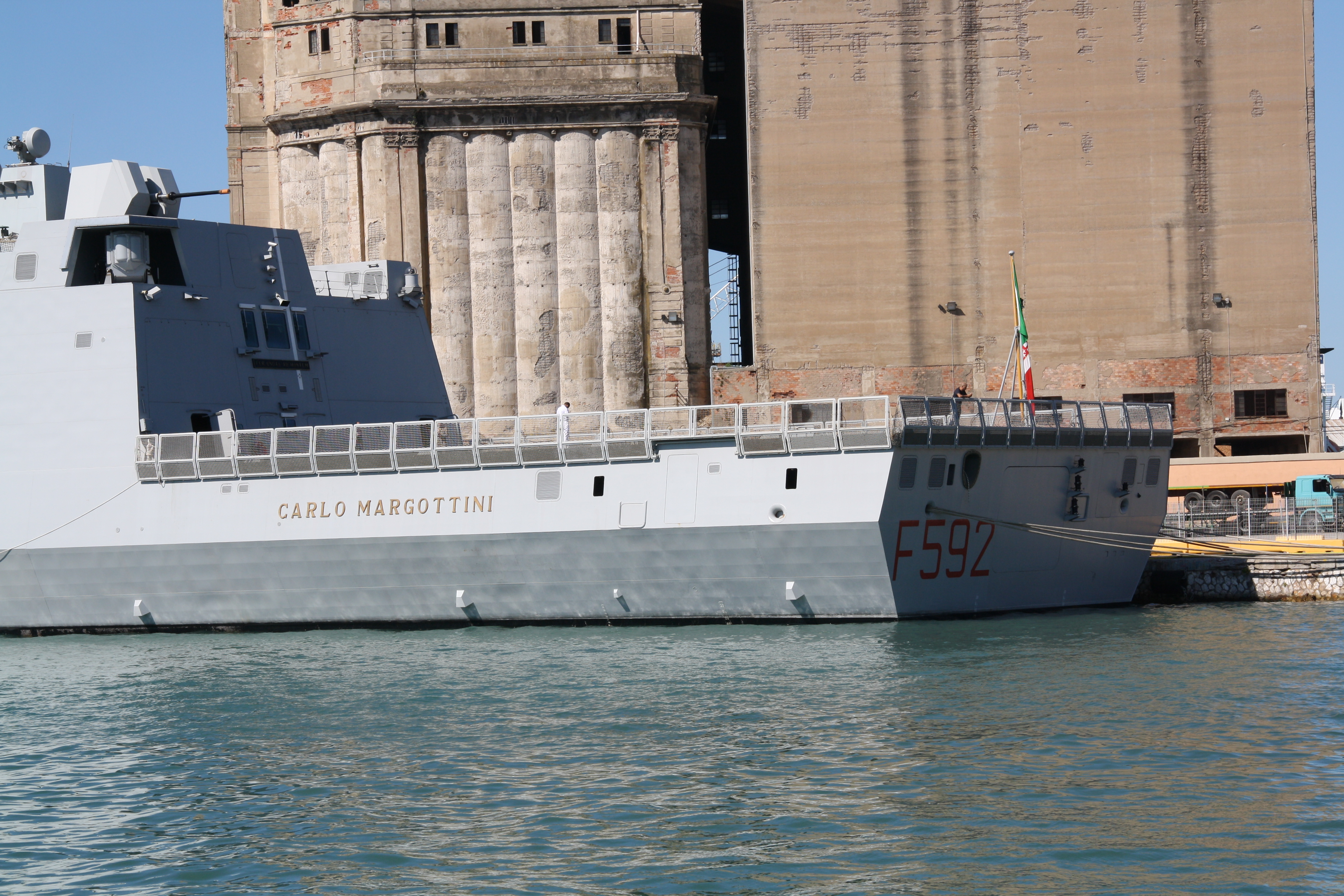
Carlo Margottini at Livorno on 27 September 2014.

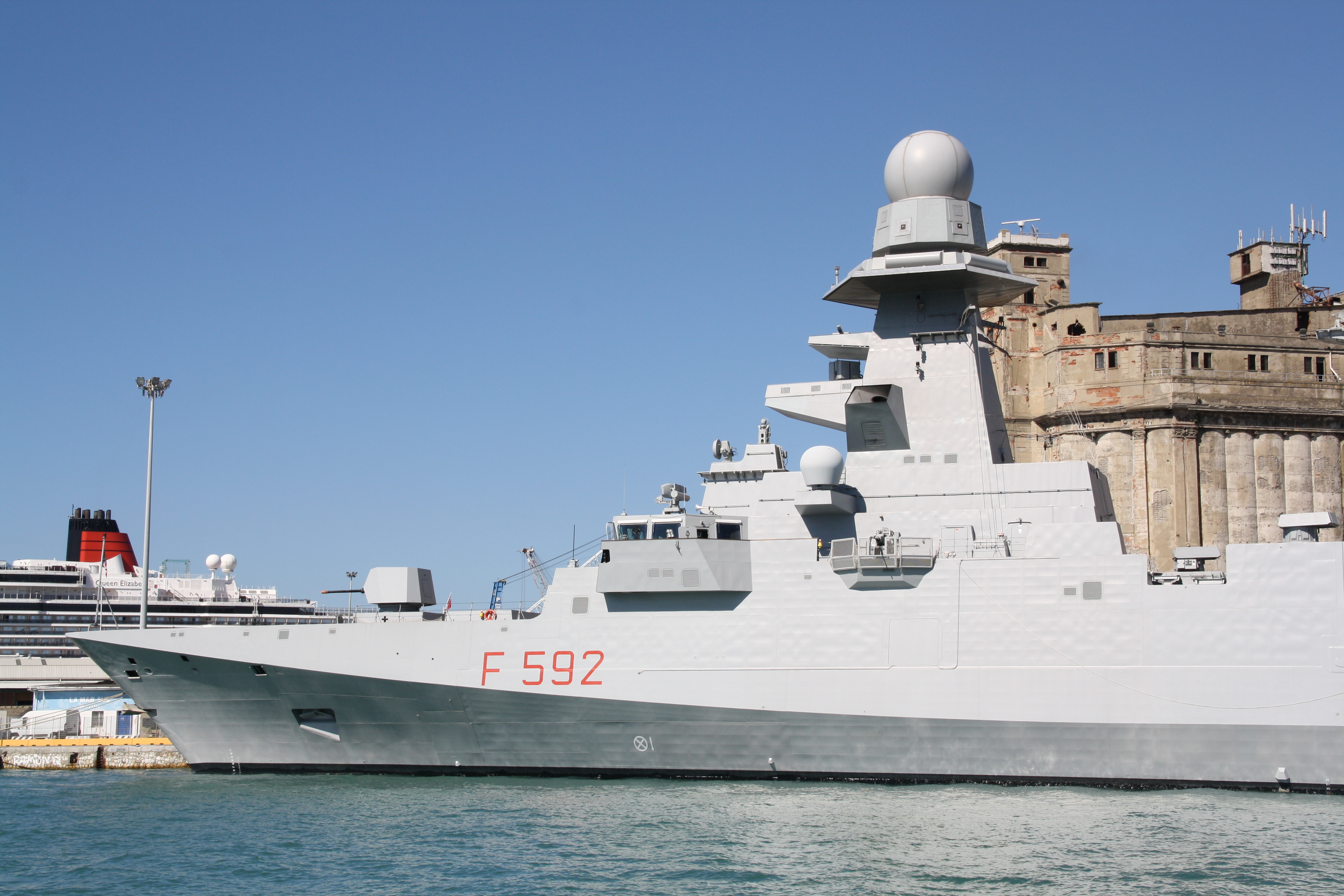
Carlo Margottini at Livorno on 27 September 2014.

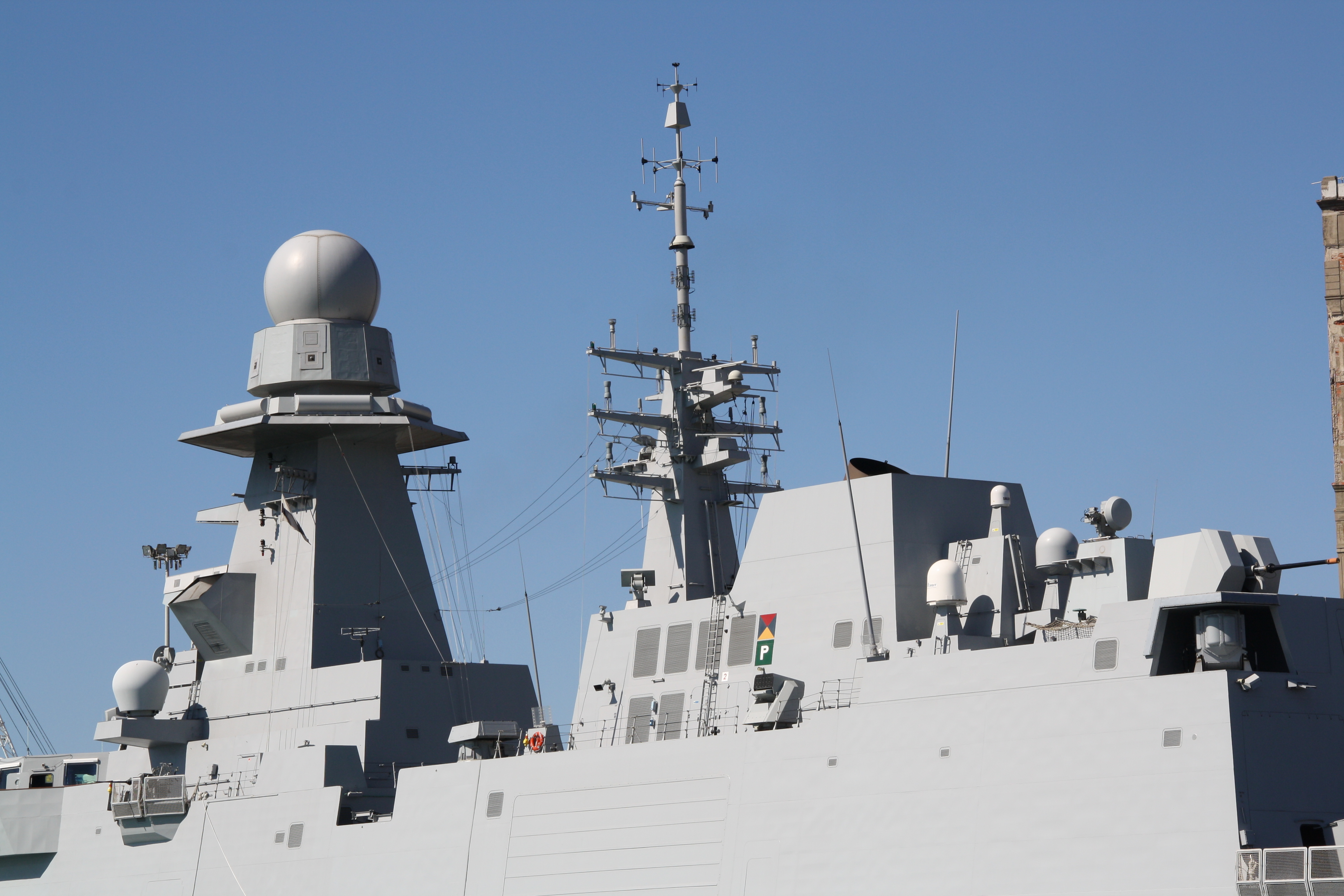
Carlo Margottini at Livorno on 27 September 2014.

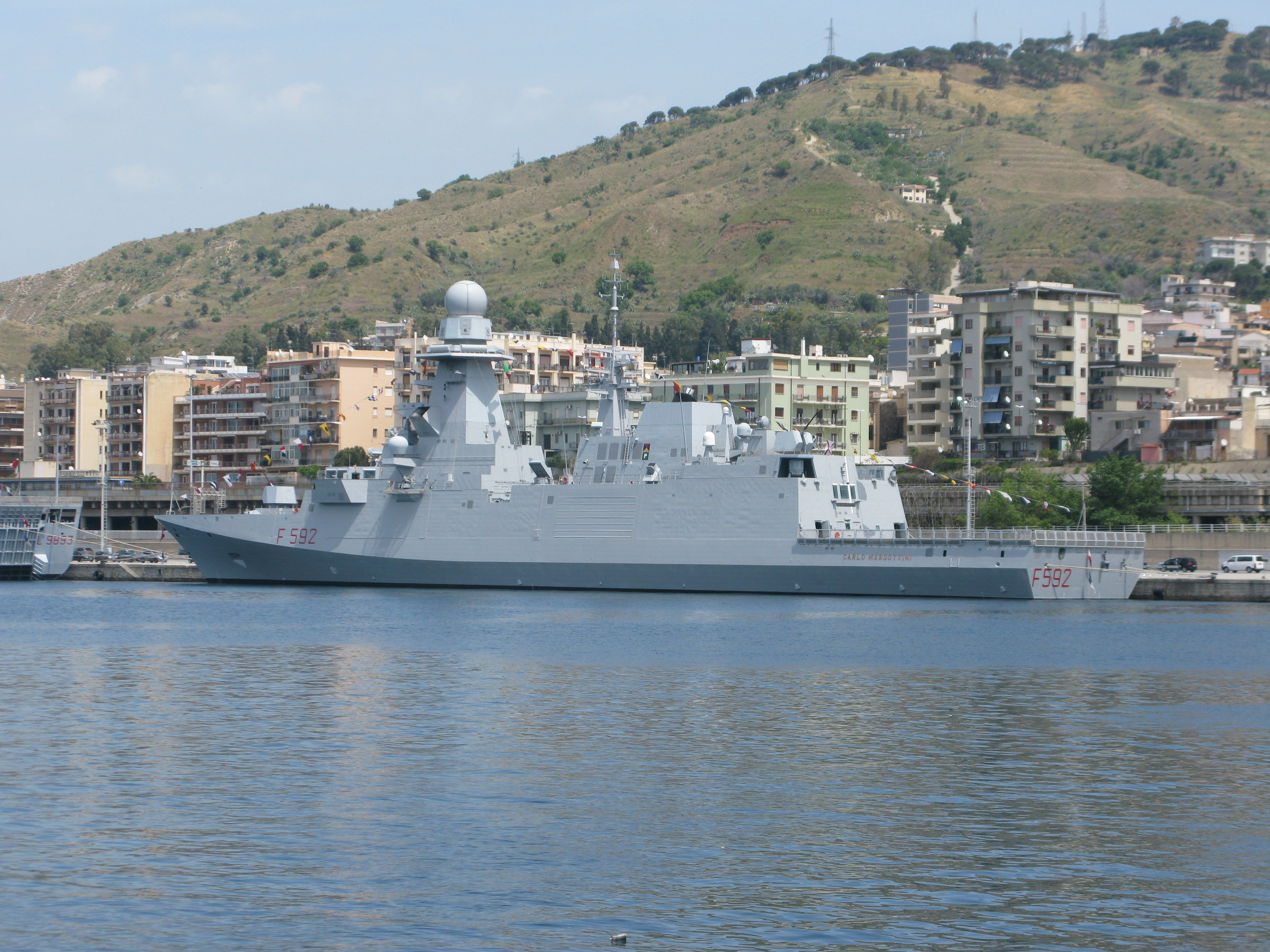
Carlo Margottini at Reggio Calabria on 22 April 2016.

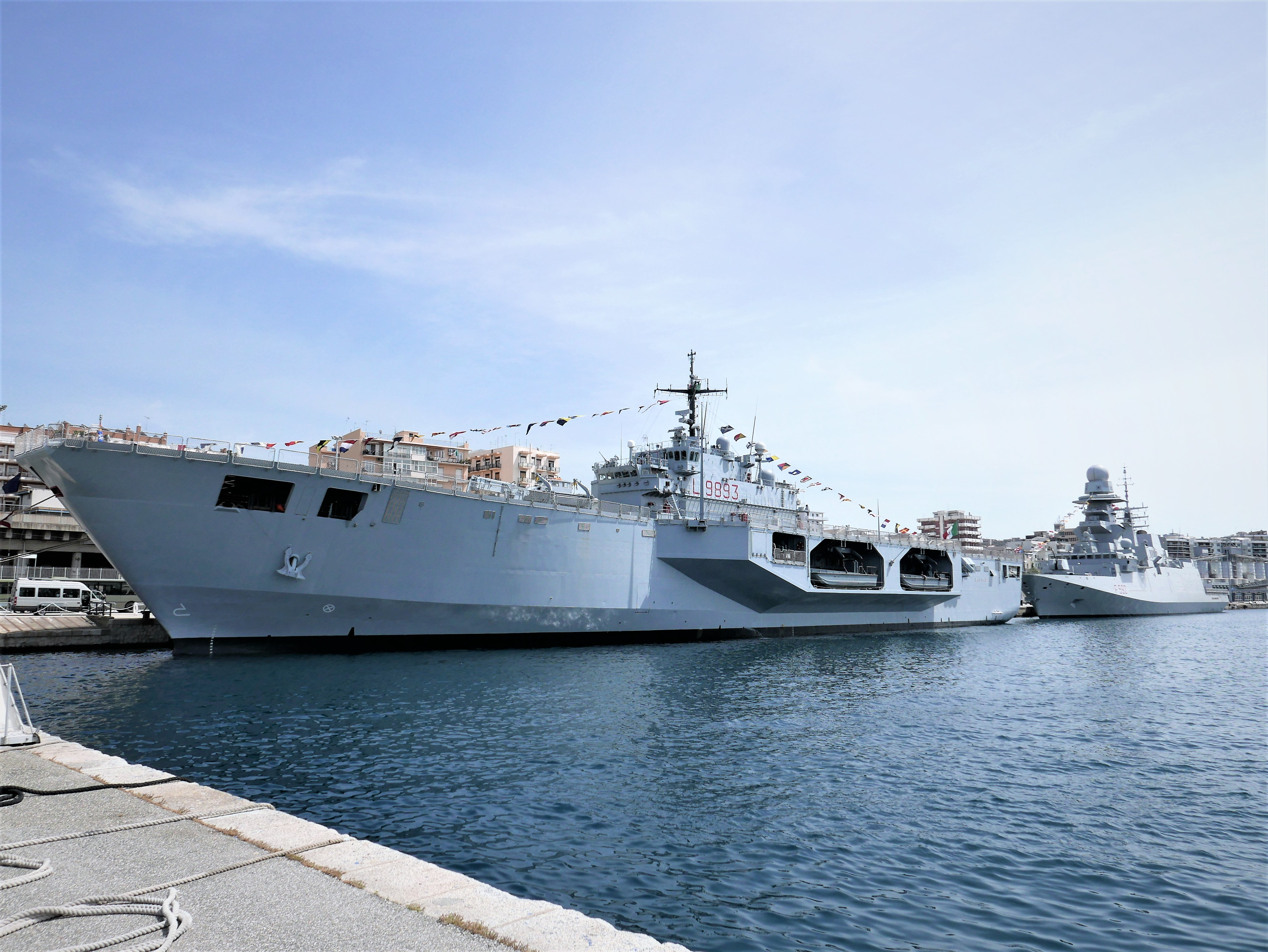
Carlo Margottini and San Marco at Reggio Calabria on 22 April 2016.

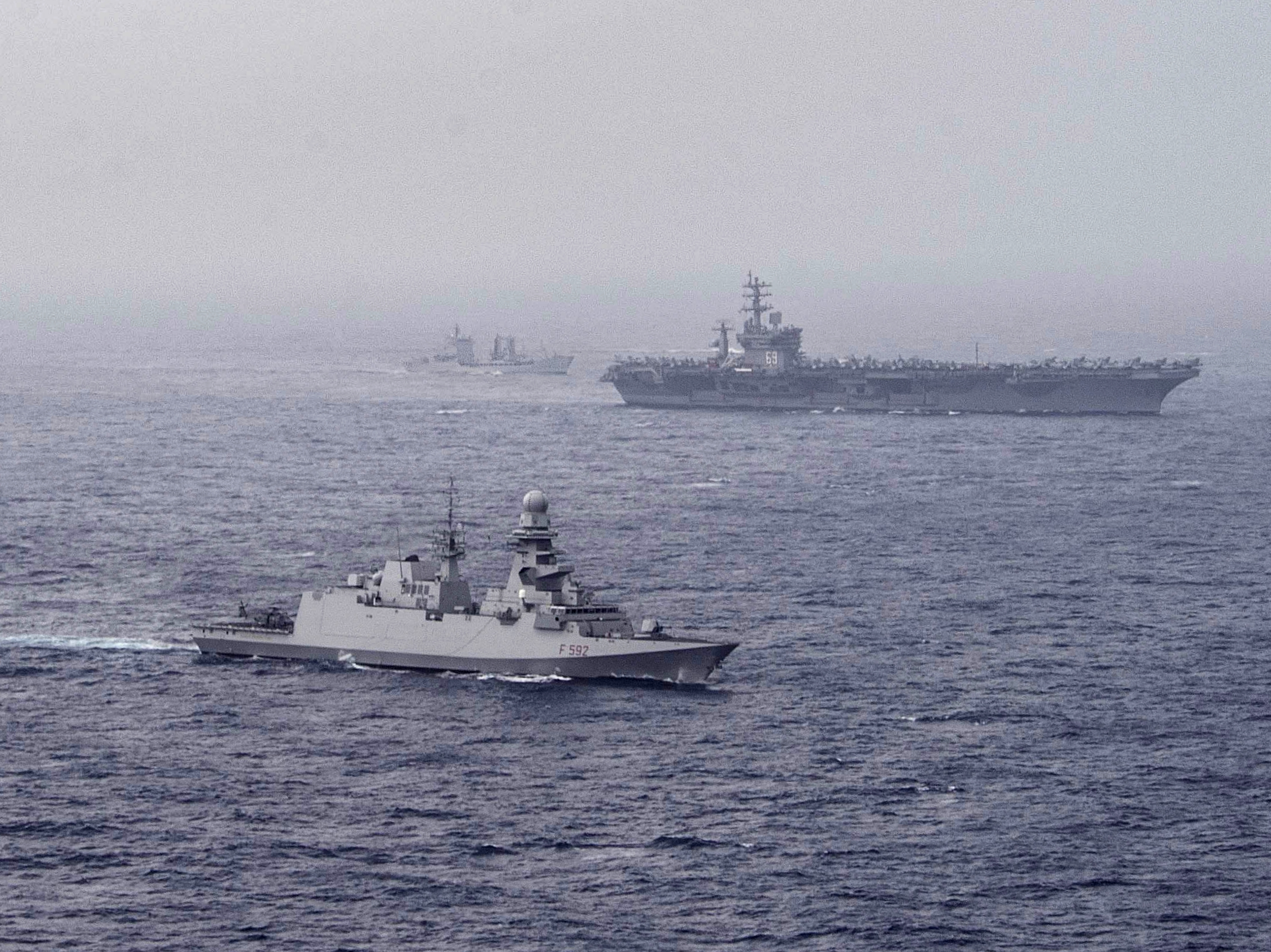
Carlo Margottini with USS Dwight D. Eisenhower on 16 June 2016.
