= HMS York (90) =

Lead ship of British York-class

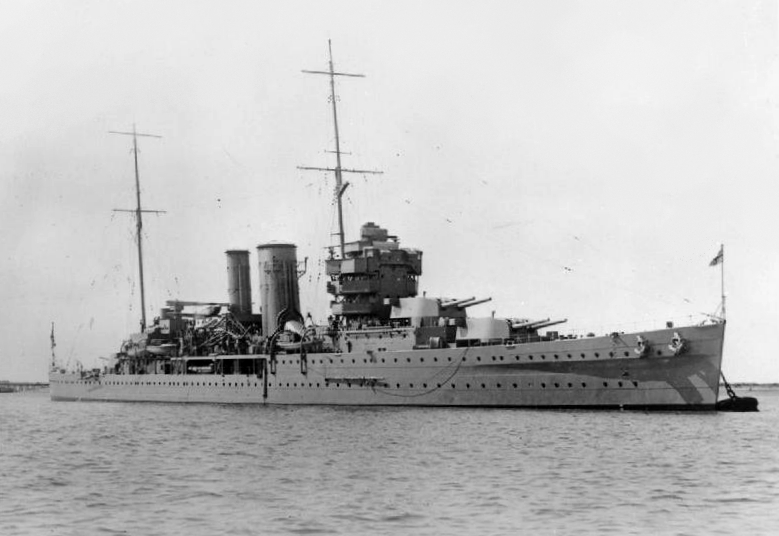
- York at anchor, 1930

History

United Kingdom
- Name: York
- Ordered: 21 October 1926
- Builder: Palmers Shipbuilding and Iron Company, Jarrow
- Laid down: 16 May 1927
- Launched: 17 July 1928
- Commissioned: 1 May 1930
- Identification: Pennant number: 90
- Fate: Sunk, 22 May 1941; Scrapped beginning 3 March 1952

General characteristics (as built)
- Class & type: York-class heavy cruiser
- Displacement: 8,250 long tons (8,380 t) (standard); 10,620 long tons (10,790 t) (deep load)
- Length: 575 ft (175.3 m)
- Beam: 57 ft (17.4 m)
- Draught: 20 ft 3 in (6.2 m)
- Installed power: 8 Admiralty 3-drum boilers; 80,000 shp (60,000 kW)
- Propulsion: 4 shafts, geared steam turbines
- Speed: 32.25 knots (59.73 km/h; 37.11 mph)
- Range: 10,000 nmi (19,000 km; 12,000 mi) at 14 knots (26 km/h; 16 mph)
- Complement: 628
- Armament: 3 × twin 8 in (203 mm) guns; 4 × single 4 in (102 mm) AA guns; 2 × single 2-pdr (40 mm (1.6 in)) AA guns; 2 × triple 21 in (533 mm) torpedo tubes
- Armour: Belt: 3 in (76 mm); Decks: 1.5 in (38 mm); Barbettes: 1 in (25 mm); Turrets: 1 in (25 mm); Bulkheads: 3.5 in (89 mm); Magazines: 3–4.375 in (76.2–111.1 mm)

HMS York was the lead ship of her class of two heavy cruisers built for the Royal Navy in the late 1920s. She mostly served on the North America and West Indies Station before World War II. Early in the war the ship escorted convoys in the Atlantic and participated in the Norwegian Campaign in 1940. York was transferred to the Mediterranean theatre in late 1940 where she escorted convoys and the larger ships of the Mediterranean Fleet. She was wrecked in an attack by Italian explosive motorboats of the 10th Flotilla MAS at Suda Bay, Crete, in March 1941. The ship's wreck was salvaged in 1952 and subsequently scrapped.

== Design and description ==
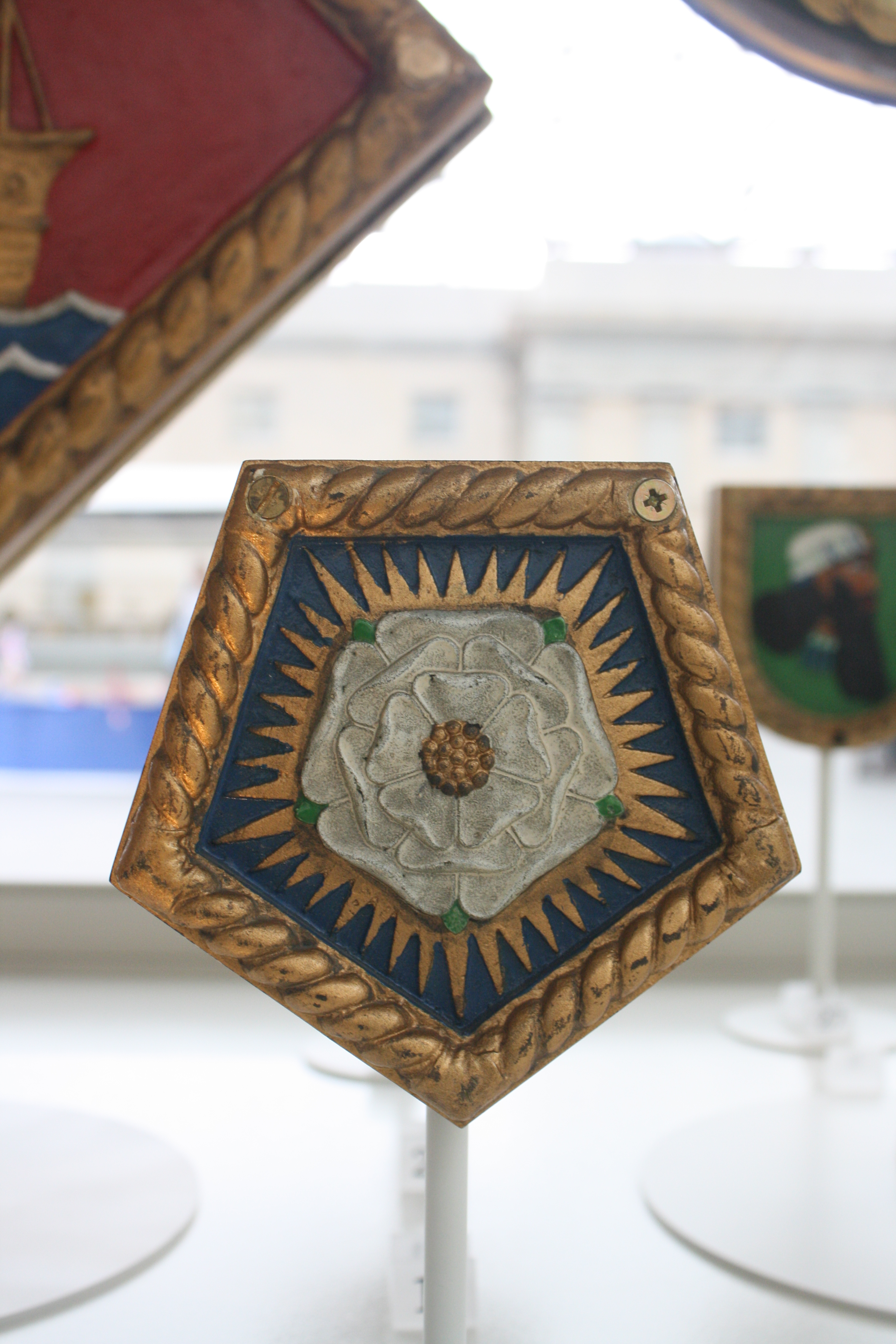
Ship's badge in the National Maritime Museum

York's design was based on the earlier County classes but was intended to be smaller and cheaper, although better armoured. She was easily distinguishable from her sister ship, Exeter, as the latter had straight masts and funnels, while those of York were angled to the rear. In addition, York also had a very tall bridge designed to clear the aircraft catapult originally planned to be carried on the superfiring ('B') gun turret forward.

York displaced 8,250 long tons (8,380 t) at standard load and 10,620 long tons (10,790 t) at deep load. The ship had an overall length of 575 feet (175.3 m), a beam of 57 feet (17.4 m) and a draught of 20 feet 3 inches (6.2 m). She was powered by Parsons geared steam turbines, driving four shafts, which developed a total of 80,000 shaft horsepower (60,000 kW) and gave a maximum speed of 32.25 knots (59.73 km/h; 37.11 mph). Steam for the turbines was provided by eight Admiralty 3-drum water-tube boilers. York carried a maximum of 1,900 long tons (1,900 t) of fuel oil that gave her a range of 13,300 nautical miles (24,600 km; 15,300 mi) at 12 knots (22 km/h; 14 mph). The ship's complement was 628 officers and ratings.

The ship mounted six 50-calibre 8-inch (203 mm) guns in three twin turrets. Her secondary armament consisted of four QF 4-inch (102 mm) Mk V anti-aircraft (AA) guns in single mounts. York mounted two single 2-pounder (40 mm) light AA guns ("pom-poms"). The ship carried two triple torpedo tube above-water mounts for 21-inch (533 mm) torpedoes.

York lacked a full waterline armor belt. The sides of her boiler and engine rooms were protected by 3 inches (76 mm) of armour and sides of the magazines were protected by 4.375 inches (111.1 mm) of armour. The transverse bulkheads at the end of her machinery rooms were 3.5 inches (89 mm) thick. The top and ends of the magazines were three inches thick. The lower deck over the machinery spaces and steering gear had a thickness of 1.5 inches (38 mm). Space and weight was reserved for one catapult and its seaplane, but they were not fitted until after she was completed. A second catapult, intended to be mounted on 'B' turret, was deleted from the design during construction.

== Service ==
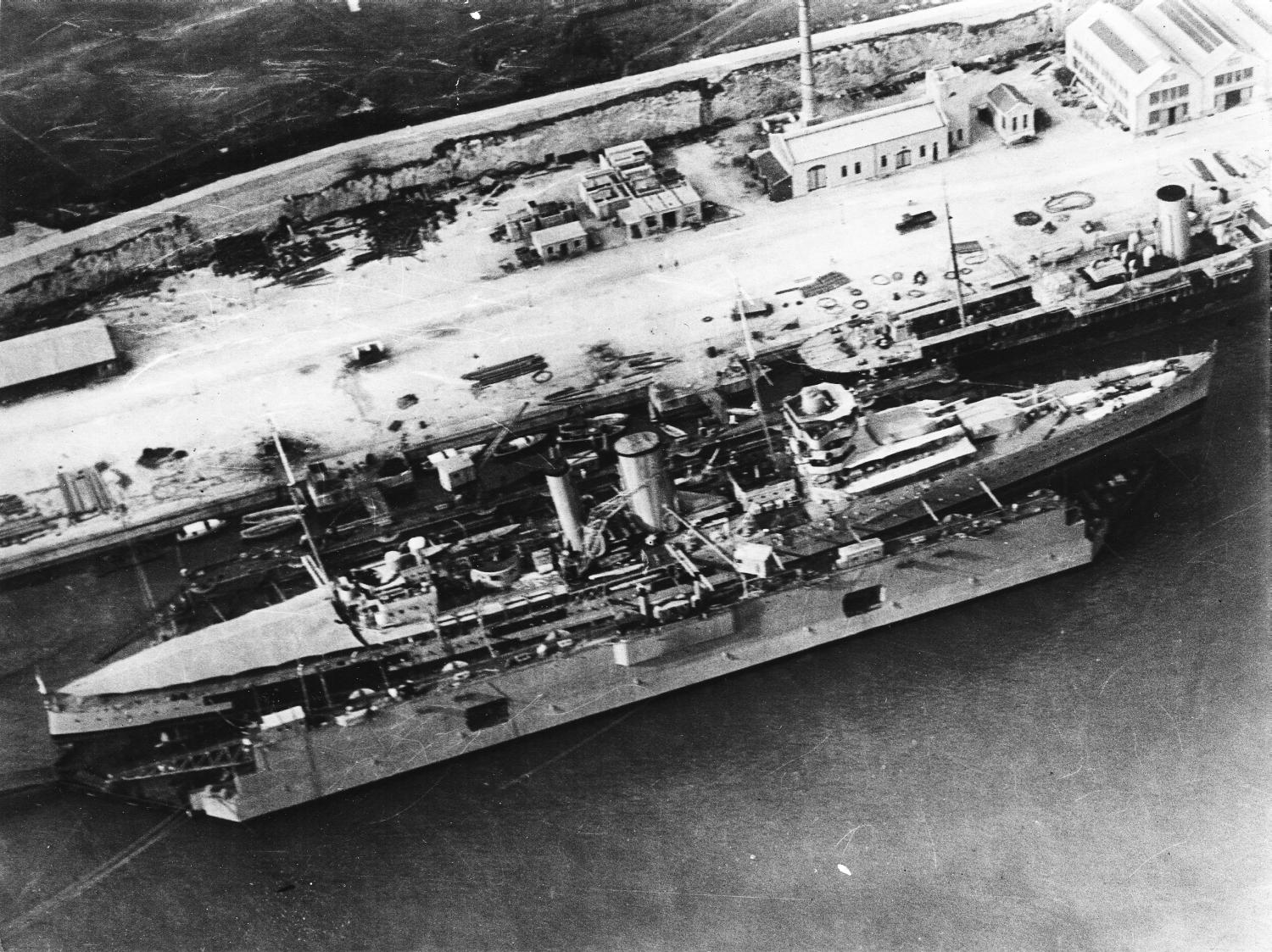
York in Admiralty Floating Dock No. 1 at HMD Bermuda in 1934.

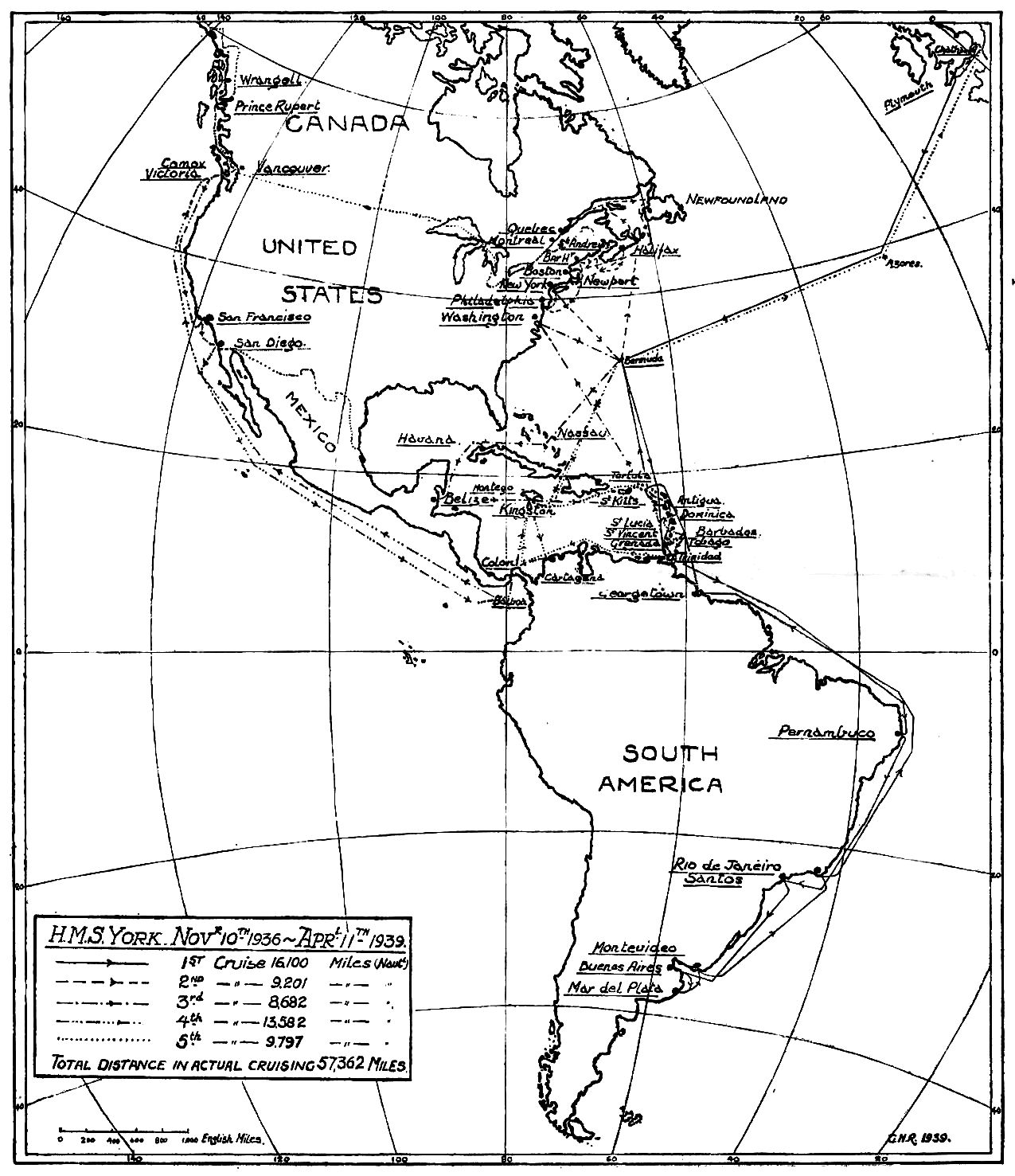
Map of the cruises of the Bermuda-based HMS York on the North America & West Indies Station, 1936–1939

York was laid down by Palmers Shipbuilding and Iron Company, Jarrow, on 18 May 1927, launched on 17 July 1928 and was completed on 1 May 1930. She became the flagship of Vice-Admiral Sir Reginald Drax, then his successor, Vice-Admiral Matthew R. Best, of the 2nd Cruiser Squadron of the Home Fleet upon commissioning. Between 1931 and 1934 she was commanded by Captain Richard Bevan. She served as the flagship of the 8th Cruiser Squadron on the North America and West Indies Station based at Bermuda. She left Cartagena, Colombia, on 29 April 1934, arriving in Bermuda for the first time (along with her sister ship Exeter from Jamaica) on 4 May to begin a refit. York was detached to the Mediterranean Fleet in 1935 and 1936 for the Second Italo-Abyssinian War, before returning to the American Station until replaced as station flagship in 1939 by HMS Berwick departing Bermuda on 31 March to refit and recommission at Chatham. York left Chatham on 2 August 1939 to take part in the review by the King at Spithead before crossing back over the Atlantic for further service on the America and West Indies Station. York arrived back at her base in Bermuda on 13 August 1939.

The ship moved to Halifax, Nova Scotia, that same month for convoy escort duties. In October 1939, York was assigned to Force F at Halifax, which was active in hunting for commerce raiders and protecting convoys. She was briefly refitted in Bermuda between 31 October and 22 November before she returned to Great Britain for a more thorough refit in December. Upon its completion on 9 February York was assigned to the 1st Cruiser Squadron of Home Fleet. On 3 March 1940 the ship intercepted the German blockade runner Arucas in the Denmark Strait near Iceland, but she was scuttled by her own crew before she could be captured.

In early April 1940, York, and the rest of her squadron, were assigned to carry troops under Plan R 4, the British plan to invade Norway. The troops were disembarked on 8 April when the British learned of the imminent German invasion of Norway and the squadron, under the command of Vice-Admiral John Cunningham, joined the bulk of the Home Fleet already at sea. On 10 April the destroyer HMS Eclipse was badly damaged by air attack and York was detailed to tow her to Lerwick for repairs. The ship, and the light cruisers HMS Manchester and HMS Birmingham, ferried the 1st Battalion of the Green Howards and other troops from Rosyth to Åndalsnes and Molde on 24–25 April. York returned home on 26 April. York was one of the ships used to evacuate British and French troops from Namsos, along with three French transports and a number of British destroyers, on the evening of 1/2 May.

=== In the Mediterranean ===
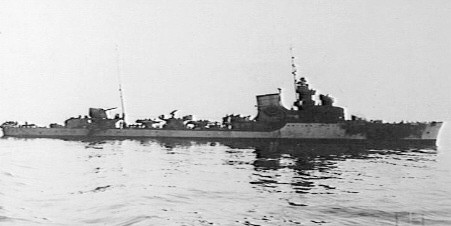
Starboard side view of the abandoned Italian destroyer Artigliere

In August 1940 York was assigned to the Mediterranean Fleet, joining the 3rd Cruiser Squadron in Alexandria in late September, after escorting a convoy around the Cape of Good Hope. Two days later she participated in Operation MB.5, where the Mediterranean Fleet escorted the light cruisers HMS Liverpool and HMS Gloucester as they ferried troops to Malta. During the Action off Cape Passero, York sank the disabled and abandoned destroyer Artigliere on 13 October after the destroyer's engagement with the light cruiser HMS Ajax the previous evening. A month later York and the Mediterranean Fleet executed Operation MB8, a complex series of manoeuvers, including Operation Judgment, where the ship escorted the aircraft carrier HMS Illustrious as her aircraft attacked the Italian Fleet at Taranto on the evening of 11/12 November. A few days later York ferried British troops from Alexandria, Egypt, to Piraeus, Greece. On 26 November, York, and the rest of the 3rd Cruiser Squadron, covered a small convoy to Malta.

The Mediterranean Fleet, including York, sortied on 16 December to conduct air strikes on Italian shipping, airbases on Rhodes and to bombard Valona. In early January 1941 the ship escorted the tanker RFA Brambleleaf and four Flower-class corvettes to Suda Bay, Crete, and covered operations in the Eastern Mediterranean during Operation Excess. She arrived back at Alexandria on 16 January. York returned to Suda Bay in early February for operations against Italian shipping. During Operation Lustre in March, she protected troop convoys from Egypt to Greece.

=== Sinking ===
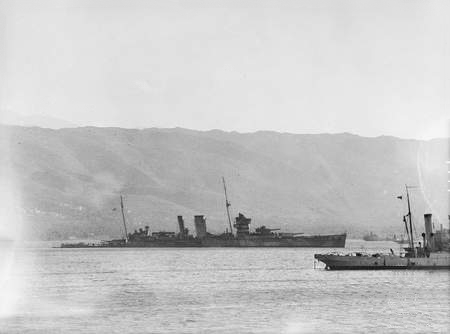
The crippled York in Suda Bay, May 1941

York was disabled at Suda Bay in Crete by two Italian explosive motorboats of the Italian Regia Marina assault Flotilla Decima Flottiglia MAS, launched by the destroyers Francesco Crispi and Quintino Sella on 26 March 1941; the two old destroyers were fitted with special cranes to operate assault craft. Six motorboats, belonging to Decima Flottiglia Mas, entered the bay, led by Tenente di vascello Luigi Faggioni, and attacked three targets in pairs; the first was York, second the tanker Pericles and last another ship at anchor. Three of the attacking boats had various problems, either mechanical or human, due to the extreme temperature conditions, but the other three successfully attacked their targets. Two motorboats, packed with 330-kilogram (728 lb) charges in the bows, struck York amidships, flooding both boiler rooms and one engine room. Two British seamen were killed. All Italian sailors survived the attack and fell into British hands. The ship was run aground to prevent her from sinking. The submarine HMS Rover was used to supply electrical power to operate the cruiser's guns for anti-aircraft defence, until Rover was severely damaged by air attack and had to be towed away for repairs. On 18 May, further damage was inflicted by German bombers and the ship was damaged beyond repair. Her main guns were wrecked by demolition charges on 22 May 1941 when the Allies began to evacuate Crete. York's wreck was salvaged in February 1952 by an Italian shipbreaker and towed to Bari to be broken up, beginning on 3 March.
