= Italian frigate Carlo Margottini (F 595) =

Bergamini-class frigates of the Italian Navy

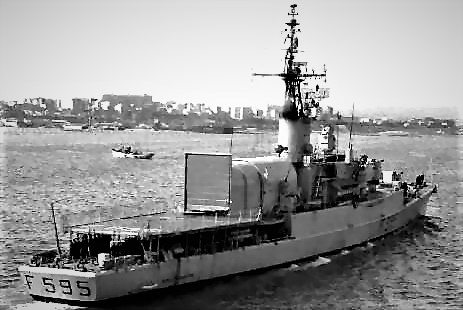
- Carlo Margottini

History

Italy
- Name: Carlo Margottini
- Namesake: Carlo Margottini
- Builder: Navalmeccanica
- Laid down: 26 May 1957
- Launched: 12 June 1960
- Commissioned: 5 May 1962
- Decommissioned: 31 May 1988
- Stricken: 1988
- Identification: Pennant number: F 595
- Motto: Tra le onde verso il nemico; (In the waves towards the enemy)
- Fate: Dismantled, 1988

General characteristics
- Class & type: Bergamini-class frigate
- Displacement: 1,410 t (1,390 long tons) standard; 1,650 t (1,620 long tons) full load
- Length: 86.5 m (283 ft 10 in) pp; 94.0 m (308 ft 5 in) overall
- Beam: 11.4 m (37 ft 5 in)
- Draught: 3.1 m (10 ft 2 in)
- Propulsion: 4 × diesels 16,000 bhp (12,000 kW); 2 × shafts
- Speed: 25 knots (46 km/h; 29 mph)
- Range: 3,000 nautical miles (5,600 km; 3,500 mi) at 18 knots (33 km/h; 21 mph)
- Complement: 163
- Sensors & processing systems: SPS-12 radar; SPQ-2 navigational radar; RTN-10 fire-control radar
- Electronic warfare & decoys: SPR-A ESM system
- Armament: 2 × 76 mm (3 in) DP guns; 1 × ASW mortar; 2 × triple 324 mm (12.8 in) torpedo tubes
- Aircraft carried: 1 × AB-212ASW helicopter
- Aviation facilities: Single hangar and helipad

Carlo Margottini (F 595) was a Bergamini-class frigate of the Italian Navy.

== Construction and career ==
She was laid down on 26 May 1957 and launched on 12 June 1960 by Navalmeccanica. She was commissioned on 5 May 1962.

Carlo Margottini and Virginio Fasan were discarded in 1988 respectively.

== Gallery ==
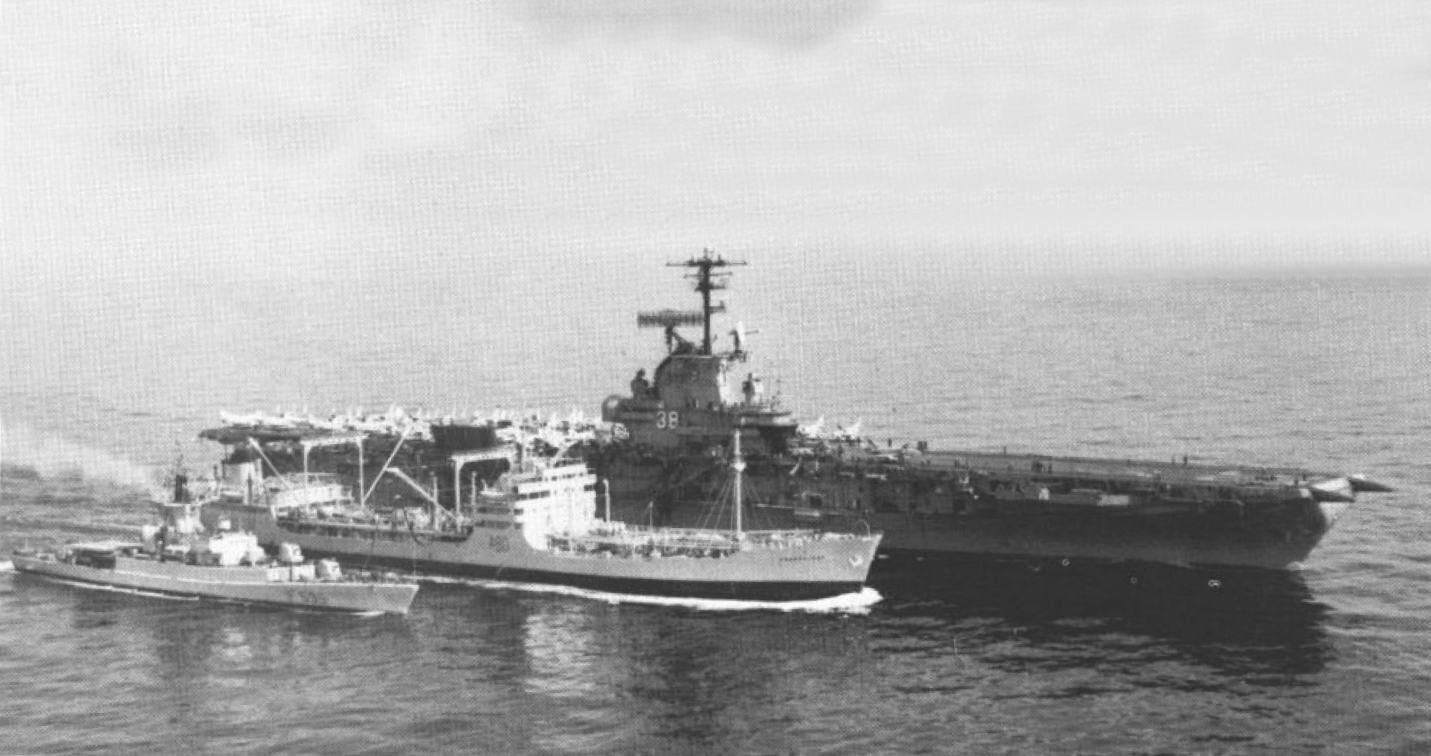
Carlo Margottini, RFA Orangeleaf and USS Shangri-la in 1967.
