= Bergamini-class frigate =

Warships of the Italian Navy

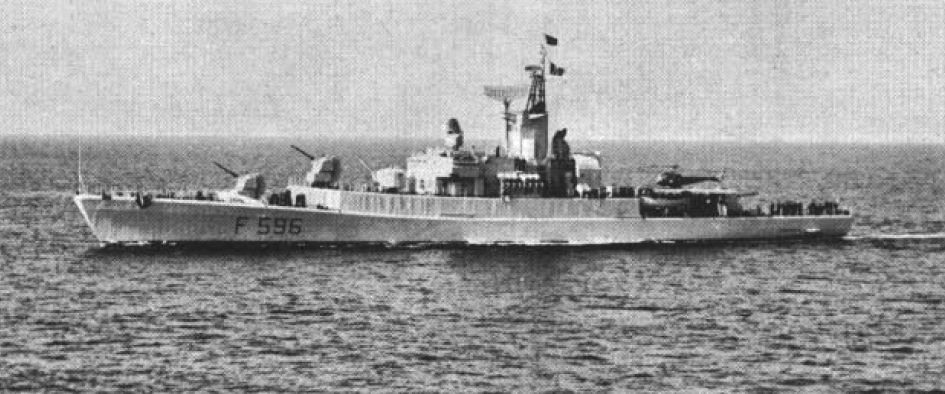
- Luigi Rizzo

Class overview
- Name: Bergamini-class frigate
- Operators: Italian Navy
- Preceded by: Centauro class
- Succeeded by: Alpino class
- In commission: 1961–1988
- Completed: 4
- Retired: 4

General characteristics
- Type: Frigate
- Displacement: 1,410 t (1,390 long tons) standard; 1,650 t (1,620 long tons) full load
- Length: 86.5 m (283 ft 10 in) pp; 94.0 m (308 ft 5 in) overall
- Beam: 11.4 m (37 ft 5 in)
- Draught: 3.1 m (10 ft 2 in)
- Propulsion: 4 × diesels 16,000 bhp (12,000 kW); 2 × shafts
- Speed: 25 knots (46 km/h; 29 mph)
- Range: 3,000 nautical miles (5,600 km; 3,500 mi) at 18 knots (33 km/h; 21 mph)
- Complement: 163
- Sensors & processing systems: SPS-12 radar; SPQ-2 navigational radar; RTN-10 fire-control radar
- Electronic warfare & decoys: SPR-A ESM system
- Armament: 2 × 76 mm (3 in) DP guns; 1 × Menon ASW mortar; 2 × triple 324 mm (12.8 in) torpedo tubes
- Aircraft carried: 1 × AB-212ASW helicopter
- Aviation facilities: Single hangar and helipad

The Bergamini class was a class of four frigates operated by the Italian Navy. They entered service in 1961, with the last one being stricken in 1988.

== Design ==
A new class of four corvettes officially designated Corvette Veloci Tipo 2 - (Type 2 Fast Corvette) for the Marina Militare (Italian Navy) was announced in 1956. They were larger than the existing Albatros-class corvettes of the Italian Navy, and carried similar anti-submarine equipment to the frigates of the Centauro class. The ships were to be powered by four diesel engines driving two shafts, which could propel the ships to 25 knots (46 km/h; 29 mph).

The armament of the class was subject to numerous changes during the design and construction process, which affected the layout of the ship. As finally built, the ships carried an anti-aircraft armament of three 76-millimetre (3 in) rapid fire cannons, capable of firing 57 rounds per minute per gun, with two forward and one aft. A single autoloading Menon anti-submarine mortar was fitted forward of the bridge and was capable of firing 15 depth charges per minute to a range of about 1,000 metres (3,300 ft). This was supplemented by two Mark 32 triple torpedo tubes capable of launching American lightweight Mark 44 torpedoes. A helicopter deck and folding hangar for a light helicopter was fitted behind the bridge, with the diesel exhaust uptakes and the ship's mast combined into a mack to make room for the hangar, while fin stabilisers were fitted to aid helicopter operations on such a small ship.

== History ==
Carlo Margottini and Luigi Rizzo were laid down at the Navalmeccanica shipyard, Castellammare in 1957. The next ship of the class, Carlo Bergamini was planned to be built by Cantieri Navale de Taranto, but the order was switched to the CRDA shipyards at Trieste, work starting in 1959. The final ship of the class, Virginio Fasan was laid down at Castellammare in 1960. Luigi Rizzo was the first to enter service in 1961, with all four ships in service by the end of 1962.

In the late 1960s, the Marina Militare adopted the AB.204 as its standard shipboard helicopter. In order to accommodate the larger helicopter, a larger helicopter deck and hangar (which was still collapsible) was fitted, which in turn required removal of the aft 76 mm gun.

Luigi Rizzo and Carlo Bergamini were decommissioned in 1980 and 1981 respectively. The final two ships were not finally stricken until 1988.

== Ships in class ==
| | Number | Builder | Laid Down | Launched | Commissioned | Stricken |
|---|---|---|---|---|---|---|
| Carlo Bergamini | F 593 | CRDA Trieste | 19 July 1959 | 16 June 1960 | 23 June 1962 | November 1981 |
| Virginio Fasan | F 594 | Navalmeccanica, Castellammare | 6 March 1960 | 9 October 1960 | 10 October 1962 | 7 December 1988 |
| Carlo Margottini | F 595 | Navalmeccanica, Castellammare | 26 May 1957 | 12 June 1960 | 5 May 1962 | 31 May 1988 |
| Luigi Rizzo | F 596 | Navalmeccanica, Castellammare | 26 May 1957 | 6 March 1960 | 15 December 1961 | 30 November 1980 |

== See also ==
Equivalent frigates of the same era

- Azopardo class
- Loch class
- Petya class
- Roofdier class
