= Italian destroyer Aviere (1937) =

Destroyer of the Regia Marina

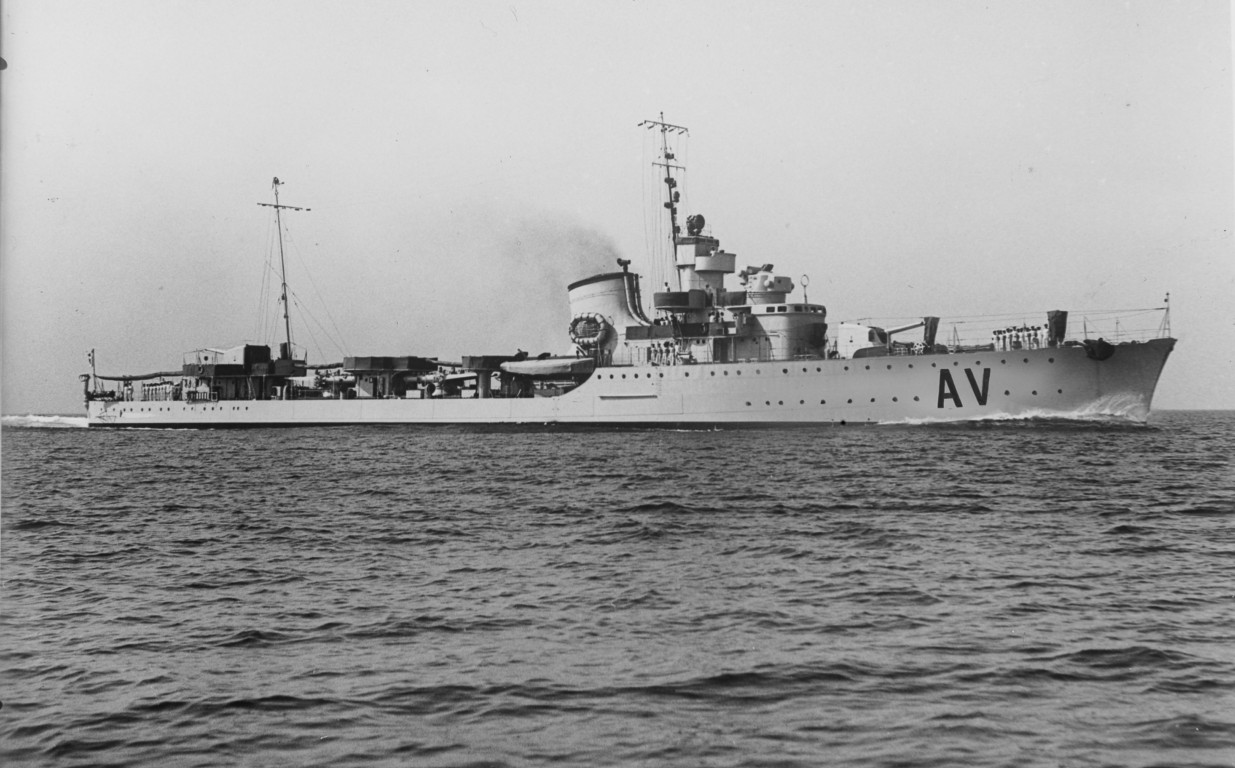
- Aviere

History

Kingdom of Italy
- Name: Aviere
- Namesake: Aviator
- Builder: O.T.O., Livorno
- Laid down: 16 January 1937
- Launched: 19 September 1937
- Completed: 31 August 1938
- Fate: Torpedoed and sunk, 17 December 1942

General characteristics (as built)
- Class & type: Soldati-class destroyer
- Displacement: 1,820–1,850 long tons (1,850–1,880 t) (standard); 2,450–2,550 long tons (2,490–2,590 t) (full load)
- Length: 106.7 m (350 ft 1 in) (o/a); 101.6 m (333 ft 4 in) (pp)
- Beam: 10.15 m (33 ft 4 in)
- Draught: 3.15–4.3 m (10 ft 4 in – 14 ft 1 in)
- Installed power: 3 Yarrow boilers; 48,000 shp (36,000 kW)
- Propulsion: 2 shafts; 2 geared steam turbines
- Speed: 34–35 knots (63–65 km/h; 39–40 mph)
- Range: 2,340 nmi (4,330 km; 2,690 mi) at 14 knots (26 km/h; 16 mph)
- Complement: 206
- Armament: 2 × twin 120 mm (4.7 in) guns; 1 × 120 mm (4.7 in) star shell gun; 8 × 20 mm (0.8 in) AA guns; 2 × triple 533 mm (21 in) torpedo tubes; 2 × depth charge throwers; 48 mines

Service record
- Part of: Destroyer Division 11
- Operations: Battle of the Mediterranean; Battle of Calabria; Battle of Cape Passero; First Battle of Sirte; Second Battle of Sirte; Operation Vigorous; Operation Pedestal

Aviere ("Airman") was one of seventeen Soldati-class destroyers, built for the Regia Marina (Royal Italian Navy) in the late 1930s and early 1940s.

== Design and description ==
The Soldati-class destroyers were slightly improved versions of the preceding Oriani class. They had a length between perpendiculars of 101.6 meters (333 ft 4 in) and an overall length of 106.7 meters (350 ft 1 in). The ships had a beam of 10.15 meters (33 ft 4 in) and a mean draft of 3.15 meters (10 ft 4 in) and 4.3 meters (14 ft 1 in) at deep load. The Soldatis displaced 1,830–1,850 metric tons (1,800–1,820 long tons) at normal load, and 2,450–2,550 metric tons (2,410–2,510 long tons) at deep load. Their wartime complement during was 206 officers and enlisted men.

Aviere was powered by two Parsons geared steam turbines, each driving one propeller shaft using steam supplied by three Yarrow boilers. Designed for a maximum output of 48,000 shaft horsepower (36,000 kW) and a speed of 34–35 knots (63–65 km/h; 39–40 mph) in service, the Soldati-class ships reached speeds of 39–40 knots (72–74 km/h; 45–46 mph) during their sea trials while lightly loaded. They carried enough fuel oil to give them a range of 2,340 nautical miles (4,330 km; 2,690 mi) at a speed of 14 knots (26 km/h; 16 mph) and 682 nmi (1,263 km; 785 mi) at a speed of 34 knots (63 km/h; 39 mph).

Aviere's main battery consisted of four 50-caliber 120-millimeter (4.7 in) guns in two twin-gun turrets, one each fore and aft of the superstructure. On a platform amidships was a 15-caliber 120-millimeter star shell gun. Anti-aircraft (AA) defense for the Soldatis was provided by eight 20-millimeter (0.8 in) Breda Model 1935 guns. The ships were equipped with six 533-millimeter (21 in) torpedo tubes in two triple mounts amidships. Although they were not provided with a sonar system for anti-submarine work, they were fitted with a pair of depth charge throwers. The ships could carry 48 mines.

== Construction and career ==
Aviere, built at the OTO shipyard in Livorno, was laid down on 16 January 1937, launched on 19 September 1937 and completed on 31 August 1938.

When Italy entered World War II on 10 June 1940, Aviere was part of the 11th Destroyer Division, together with sister ships Artigliere, Geniere and Camicia Nera. On 11 June Aviere and her sister ships carried out a reconnaissance mission in the Sicilian Channel, and on 19 June they carried supplies from Augusta to Benghazi, Libya.

On 9 July Aviere and her division participated in the Battle of Calabria; in the final phase of the battle the 11th Destroyer Division was ordered to attack the Mediterranean Fleet with torpedoes and did so (overall, ten torpedoes were launched), but scored no hits.

On 11–12 October Aviere participated in the Battle of Cape Passero, where she was seriously damaged by gunfire from HMS Ajax. Between March and September 1941 she escorted a number of convoys with troops and supplies from Italy to Libya; on 23 September 1941 she took part in a minelaying operation, escorting sister ships Lanciere, Carabiniere, Ascari and Corazziere that laid a minefield south of Malta.

On 21 November and 13 December 1941 Aviere participated in two large convoy operations between Italy and Libya, which failed due to heavy attacks by aircraft and submarines; in both instances, she was detached to escort back to base damaged warships of the heavy cover groups (heavy cruiser Trieste, that had been torpedoed by HMS Utmost on 21 November, and battleship Vittorio Veneto, torpedoed by HMS Urge, on 13 December). On 16 December Aviere took part in another large convoy operation to Libya, which was successful, and participated in the First Battle of Sirte.

Between January and March 1942 Aviere participated in the escorts of four more large convoy operations to Libya, "M. 43", "T. 18", "K. 7" and "V. 5", that were successful, with the only loss of the transport Victoria, sunk by Fairey Albacore torpedo bombers on 24 January. On 21–22 March she took part in the Second Battle of Sirte, and on 11–12 August she participated in Operation Pedestal, where she towed the damaged heavy cruiser Bolzano, torpedoed by HMS Unbroken, to the island of Panarea.

Between September and December 1942 Aviere carried out a number of escort and transport missions between Italy and North Africa. On 16 December 1942 she sailed from Naples together with sister ship Camicia Nera, escorting the German freighter Ankara towards Bizerta; at 11:15 on the following day, the submarine HMS Splendid attacked the convoy and torpedoed Aviere, which blew up, broke in two and quickly sank in 38°00' N, 10°05' E. About one hundred of Aviere's 250 crew survived the initial sinking, but only 30 could be eventually rescued by the torpedo boats Calliope and Perseo on that afternoon, the rest having perished. 220 men were lost, among them the commanding officer of Aviere and DesDiv 11, Captain Ignazio Castrogiovanni, who was posthumously awarded the Gold Medal of Military Valor.

== Bibliography ==
- Brescia, Maurizio (2012). Mussolini's Navy: A Reference Guide to the Regina Marina 1930–45. Annapolis, Maryland: Naval Institute Press. ISBN 978-1-59114-544-8.
- Fraccaroli, Aldo (1968). Italian Warships of World War II. Shepperton, UK: Ian Allan. ISBN 0-7110-0002-6.
- Roberts, John (1980). "Italy". In Chesneau, Roger (ed.). Conway's All the World's Fighting Ships 1922–1946. New York: Mayflower Books. pp. 280–317. ISBN 0-8317-0303-2.
- Rohwer, Jürgen (2005). Chronology of the War at Sea 1939–1945: The Naval History of World War Two (Third Revised ed.). Annapolis, Maryland: Naval Institute Press. ISBN 1-59114-119-2.
- Whitley, M. J. (1988). Destroyers of World War 2: An International Encyclopedia. Annapolis, Maryland: Naval Institute Press. ISBN 1-85409-521-8.
