= Italian destroyer Ascari =

Destroyer of the Regia Marina

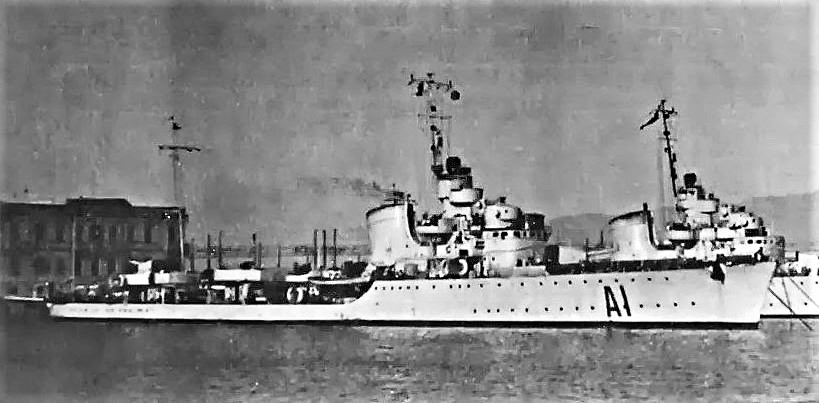
- Ascari in 1940

History

Kingdom of Italy
- Name: Ascari
- Namesake: Askari
- Builder: O.T.O., Livorno
- Laid down: 11 December 1937
- Launched: 31 July 1938
- Completed: 6 May 1939
- Fate: Sunk by mines, 24 March 1943

General characteristics (as built)
- Class & type: Soldati-class destroyer
- Displacement: 1,820–1,850 long tons (1,850–1,880 t) (standard); 2,450–2,550 long tons (2,490–2,590 t) (full load)
- Length: 106.7 m (350 ft 1 in) (o/a); 101.6 m (333 ft 4 in) (pp)
- Beam: 10.15 m (33 ft 4 in)
- Draught: 3.15–4.3 m (10 ft 4 in – 14 ft 1 in)
- Installed power: 3 Yarrow boilers; 48,000 shp (36,000 kW)
- Propulsion: 2 shafts; 2 geared steam turbines
- Speed: 34–35 knots (63–65 km/h; 39–40 mph)
- Range: 2,340 nmi (4,330 km; 2,690 mi) at 14 knots (26 km/h; 16 mph)
- Complement: 206
- Armament: 2 × twin 120 mm (4.7 in) guns; 1 × 120 mm (4.7 in) star shell gun; 8 × 20 mm (0.8 in) AA guns; 2 × triple 533 mm (21 in) torpedo tubes; 2 × depth charge throwers; 48 mines

Service record
- Part of: Destroyer Division 12
- Operations: Battle of the Mediterranean; Battle of Calabria; Battle of Cape Spartivento; Battle of Cape Matapan; Operation Halberd; First Battle of Sirte; Second Battle of Sirte; Operation Harpoon; Operation Pedestal

Ascari was one of nineteen Soldati-class destroyers built for the Regia Marina (Royal Italian Navy) in the late 1930s and early 1940s. Completed in mid-1939, she was the last of the first batch of a dozen ships to enter service.

== Design and description ==
The Soldati-class destroyers were slightly improved versions of the preceding Oriani class. They had a length between perpendiculars of 101.6 meters (333 ft 4 in) and an overall length of 106.7 meters (350 ft 1 in). The ships had a beam of 10.15 meters (33 ft 4 in) and a mean draft of 3.15 meters (10 ft 4 in) and 4.3 meters (14 ft 1 in) at deep load. The Soldatis displaced 1,830–1,850 metric tons (1,800–1,820 long tons) at normal load, and 2,450–2,550 metric tons (2,410–2,510 long tons) at deep load. Their wartime complement during was 206 officers and enlisted men.

Ascari was powered by two Parsons geared steam turbines, each driving one propeller shaft using steam supplied by three Yarrow boilers. Designed for a maximum output of 48,000 shaft horsepower (36,000 kW) and a speed of 34–35 knots (63–65 km/h; 39–40 mph) in service, the Soldati-class ships reached speeds of 39–40 knots (72–74 km/h; 45–46 mph) during their sea trials while lightly loaded. They carried enough fuel oil to give them a range of 2,340 nautical miles (4,330 km; 2,690 mi) at a speed of 14 knots (26 km/h; 16 mph) and 682 nmi (1,263 km; 785 mi) at a speed of 34 knots (63 km/h; 39 mph).

Ascari's main battery consisted of four 50-caliber 120-millimeter (4.7 in) guns in two twin-gun turrets, one each fore and aft of the superstructure. On a platform amidships was a 15-caliber 120-millimeter star shell gun. Anti-aircraft (AA) defense for the Soldatis was provided by eight 20-millimeter (0.8 in) Breda Model 1935 guns. The ships were equipped with six 533-millimeter (21 in) torpedo tubes in two triple mounts amidships. Although they were not provided with a sonar system for anti-submarine work, they were fitted with a pair of depth charge throwers. The ships could carry 48 mines.

== Construction and career ==
Ascari, built at the OTO shipyard in Livorno, was laid down on 11 December 1937, launched on 31 July 1938 and completed on 6 May 1939. She was the last ship of the first (pre-war) group of the Soldati class to enter service.

When Italy entered World War II on 10 June 1940, Ascari was part of the 12th Destroyer Division, together with sister ships Lanciere, Corazziere and Carabiniere. On 11 June Ascari and her sister ships carried out a reconnaissance mission in the Sicilian Channel.

On 9 July 1940 Ascari and her division participated in the Battle of Calabria; in the final phase of the battle, the 12th Destroyer Division was ordered to attack the British Mediterranean Fleet with torpedoes. Ascari fired a torpedo at a British cruiser, but without success. Between late July and early August Ascari was among the escorts in a large convoy operation to Libya, Operation "T.V.L".

On 5 October Ascari and the rest of the DesDiv 12 sailed from Taranto as part of the escort of a convoy heading for the Dodecanese (Operation CV), but the operation was cancelled after British battleships were sighted by aerial reconnaissance in the eastern Mediterranean. On 26–27 November 1940, Ascari participated in the Battle of Cape Spartivento; during the battle, Lanciere was hit by a 6in shell from the cruiser HMS Manchester that left her dead in the water, and Ascari took her in tow and towed the crippled ship to Cagliari.

In February 1941 Ascari participated in convoy operations between Italy and North Africa, and on 25 February she rescued the survivors of the light cruiser Armando Diaz, that had been torpedoed and sunk by HMS Upright. Between 26 and 29 March 1941 Ascari and the rest of her division escorted the 3rd Cruiser Division during the Battle of Cape Matapan.

Between March and September 1941 Ascari escorted a number of convoys between Italy and Libya. Most of these convoys were successful, but on 24 May 1941 the troopship Conte Rosso was torpedoed and sunk by HMS Upholder with the loss of nearly 1,300 men.

On 23 September 1941 Ascari and sister ships laid a minefield off Malta, and on the following day they participated in a sortie by the 3rd and 8th Cruiser Divisions aimed at intercepting a British convoy, without success. On 13 December she joined a large convoy operation between Italy and Libya, "M. 41", which failed due to heavy attacks by aircraft and submarines. On 16 December Ascari took part in another large convoy operation to Libya, "M. 42", which was successful, despite a brief encounter with the escort of an Allied convoy to Malta, in an action known as the First Battle of Sirte.

Between January and March 1942 Ascari participated in the escorts of four more large convoy operations to Libya, "M. 43", "T. 18", "K. 7" and "V. 5", that were successful; the only loss during these operations was the troopship Victoria, sunk by Allied torpedo bombers on 24 January 1942. Ascari rescued survivors from the transport. On 21–22 March Ascari took part in the Second Battle of Sirte.

On 13–15 June 1942 Ascari, attached to the 10th Destroyer Division, participated in Operation Harpoon, attacking a British convoy to Malta together with the 7th Cruiser Division and 14th Destroyer Division. In the subsequent battle Ascari, together with Alfredo Oriani, engaged the escorting British destroyers, scoring hits on HMS Bedouin, and later finished off the tanker Kentucky and the steamer Burdwan, previously disabled by Axis air strikes. Researcher Francesco Matessini said that Ascari sank the drifting Burdwan with two torpedoes. Between late 1942 and early 1943, Ascari participated in a number of minelaying missions in the Sicilian Channel, as well as escort and troop transport missions between Italy and Tunisia.

On 23 March 1943 Ascari sailed from Palermo carrying German troops towards Tunis, and was joined at sea by the sister ship Camicia Nera and two other destroyers, Leone Pancaldo and Lanzerotto Malocello, also carrying German troops. At 7:18 on 24 March, Lanzerotto Malocello struck a mine laid by HMS Abdiel about 28 miles north of Cape Bon and was left dead in the water. It was initially thought that the ship had been torpedoed, and Commander Mario Gerini, Ascari's commanding officer and also in command of the destroyer group, ordered Leone Pancaldo and Camicia Nera to proceed towards Tunis as he tried with Ascari to bring help to Lanzerotto Malocello, that sank about 90 minutes later. While rescuing Lanzerotto Malocello's survivors, however, Ascari hit in turn three mines, losing her bow and stern and finally sinking at 13:12, about 25 miles north of Zembretta. Some MAS boats sent from Bizerta and Pantelleria reached the scene after about four hours, and could only rescue 59 of the 533 troops and crew aboard Ascari. Commander Gerini was lost together with 193 of his crew and 280 German soldiers.

== Bibliography ==
- Brescia, Maurizio (2012). Mussolini's Navy: A Reference Guide to the Regina Marina 1930–45. Annapolis, Maryland: Naval Institute Press. ISBN 978-1-59114-544-8.
- Fraccaroli, Aldo (1968). Italian Warships of World War II. Shepperton, UK: Ian Allan. ISBN 0-7110-0002-6.
- Roberts, John (1980). "Italy". In Chesneau, Roger (ed.). Conway's All the World's Fighting Ships 1922–1946. New York: Mayflower Books. pp. 280–317. ISBN 0-8317-0303-2.
- Rohwer, Jürgen (2005). Chronology of the War at Sea 1939–1945: The Naval History of World War Two (Third Revised ed.). Annapolis, Maryland: Naval Institute Press. ISBN 1-59114-119-2.
- Whitley, M. J. (1988). Destroyers of World War 2: An International Encyclopedia. Annapolis, Maryland: Naval Institute Press. ISBN 1-85409-521-8.
