= Italian destroyer Mitragliere =

Destroyer of the Regia Marina

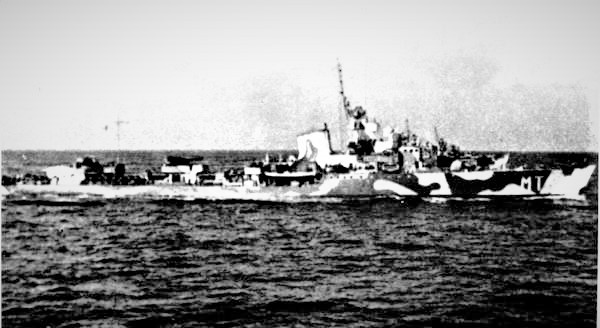

History

Kingdom of Italy
- Name: Mitragliere
- Namesake: Machine gunner
- Builder: Cantieri Navali Riuniti, Ancona
- Laid down: 7 October 1940
- Launched: 28 September 1941
- Completed: 1 February 1942
- Stricken: 14 July 1948
- Fate: Transferred to France as war reparations, 15 July 1948

General characteristics (as built)
- Class & type: Soldati-class destroyer
- Displacement: 1,820–1,850 long tons (1,850–1,880 t) (standard); 2,450–2,550 long tons (2,490–2,590 t) (full load)
- Length: 106.7 m (350 ft 1 in) (o/a); 101.6 m (333 ft 4 in) (p/p)
- Beam: 10.15 m (33 ft 4 in)
- Draught: 3.15–4.3 m (10 ft 4 in – 14 ft 1 in)
- Installed power: 3 Yarrow boilers; 44,000 shp (33,000 kW)
- Propulsion: 2 shafts; 2 geared steam turbines
- Speed: 32–33 knots (59–61 km/h; 37–38 mph)
- Range: 2,500 nmi (4,600 km; 2,900 mi) at 14 knots (26 km/h; 16 mph)
- Complement: 206
- Armament: 2 × twin, 1 × single 120 mm (4.7 in) guns; 8–12 × 20 mm (0.8 in) AA guns; 2 × triple 533 mm (21 in) torpedo tubes; 2–4 × depth charge throwers; 48 mines

Mitragliere was one of nineteen Soldati-class destroyers built for the Regia Marina (Royal Italian Navy) in the late 1930s and early 1940s. Completed in early 1942, she was the first ship to be finished of the second batch of seven ships.

== Design and description ==
The Soldati-class destroyers were slightly improved versions of the preceding Oriani class. They had a length between perpendiculars of 101.6 meters (333 ft 4 in) and an overall length of 106.7 meters (350 ft 1 in). The ships had a beam of 10.15 meters (33 ft 4 in) and a mean draft of 3.15 meters (10 ft 4 in) and 4.3 meters (14 ft 1 in) at deep load. The Soldatis displaced 1,830–1,850 metric tons (1,800–1,820 long tons) at normal load, and 2,450–2,550 metric tons (2,410–2,510 long tons) at deep load. Their wartime complement during was 206 officers and enlisted men.

Mitragliere was powered by two Belluzzo geared steam turbines, each driving one propeller shaft using steam supplied by three Yarrow boilers. Designed for a maximum output of 44,000 shaft horsepower (33,000 kW) and a speed of 32–33 knots (59–61 km/h; 37–38 mph) in service, the second batch of Soldati-class ships reached speeds of 34–36 knots (63–67 km/h; 39–41 mph) during their sea trials while lightly loaded. They carried enough fuel oil to give them a range of 2,500 nautical miles (4,600 km; 2,900 mi) at a speed of 14 knots (26 km/h; 16 mph) and 885 nmi (1,639 km; 1,018 mi) at a speed of 34 knots (63 km/h; 39 mph).

Mitragliere's main battery consisted of five 50-caliber 120-millimeter (4.7 in) guns in two twin-gun turrets, one each fore and aft of the superstructure and the fifth gun was mounted on a platform amidships. Anti-aircraft (AA) defense for the second-batch Soldatis was provided by eight to twelve 20-millimeter (0.8 in) Breda Model 1935 guns. The ships were equipped with six 533-millimeter (21 in) torpedo tubes in two triple mounts amidships. Although they were not provided with a sonar system for anti-submarine work, they were fitted with one or two pairs of depth charge throwers. The ships could carry 48 mines.

== Bibliography ==
- Brescia, Maurizio (2012). Mussolini's Navy: A Reference Guide to the Regina Marina 1930–45. Annapolis, Maryland: Naval Institute Press. ISBN 978-1-59114-544-8.
- Dodson, Aidan & Cant, Serena (2020). Spoils of War: The Fate of Enemy Fleets after Two World Wars. Barnsley, UK: Seaforth Publishing. ISBN 978-1-5267-4198-1.
- Fraccaroli, Aldo (1968). Italian Warships of World War II. Shepperton, UK: Ian Allan. ISBN 0-7110-0002-6.
- Roberts, John (1980). "Italy". In Chesneau, Roger (ed.). Conway's All the World's Fighting Ships 1922–1946. New York: Mayflower Books. pp. 280–317. ISBN 0-8317-0303-2.
- Rohwer, Jürgen (2005). Chronology of the War at Sea 1939–1945: The Naval History of World War Two (Third Revised ed.). Annapolis, Maryland: Naval Institute Press. ISBN 1-59114-119-2.
- Smigielski, Adam (1995). "Italy". In Chumbley, Stephen (ed.). Conway's All the World's Fighting Ships 1947-1995. Annapolis, Maryland: Naval Institute Press. pp. 195–218. ISBN 1-55750-132-7.
- Whitley, M. J. (1988). Destroyers of World War 2: An International Encyclopedia. Annapolis, Maryland: Naval Institute Press. ISBN 1-85409-521-8.
