= Ian McGeoch =

Royal Navy Vice-Admiral (1914–2007)

Vice-Admiral Sir Ian McGeoch KCB DSO DSC
- Born: 26 March 1914; Helensburgh, Dunbartonshire
- Died: 12 August 2007 (aged 93)
- Military career
- Allegiance: United Kingdom
- Branch: Royal Navy
- Service years: 1931–1970
- Rank: Vice-Admiral
- Commands: HMS Ursula; HMS Splendid; HMS Fernie; 4th Submarine Squadron; 3rd Submarine Squadron; Royal Naval College, Greenwich
- Conflicts: World War II: Siege of Malta; Operation Torch; Prisoner of war (escaped); British Pacific Fleet
- Awards: Mention in dispatches DSO DSC CB
- Other work: MPhil, Editor of Naval Review, Author of An Affair of Chances: a Submariner's Odyssey, 1939-44 and Earl Mountbatten, The Princely Sailor, member of the Queen’s Bodyguard for Scotland

Vice-Admiral Sir Ian Lachlan Mackay McGeoch, KCB, DSO, DSC (26 March 1914 – 12 August 2007) was a commissioned officer in the Royal Navy of the United Kingdom. He commanded the submarine HMS Splendid during the Second World War, and was later Flag Officer Submarines (FOSM) and Flag Officer Scotland and Northern Ireland (FOSNI).

== Early life ==
McGeoch was born in Helensburgh, on the north shore of the Firth of Clyde. A burly figure, he was educated at Pangbourne Nautical College, and joined the Royal Navy in 1931 as a special entry cadet. From 1933, he served as a midshipman on the battleship HMS Royal Oak, then on the destroyer HMS Boadicea, and then the heavy cruiser HMS Devonshire. He volunteered to serve on submarines, and attended the course at HMS Dolphin in 1936. Promoted to lieutenant, he joined HMS Clyde, based in Malta, as navigator and third hand.

== Second World War ==
McGeoch was serving with HMS Clyde when the Second World War broke out, returning to England in January 1940. He then served as 1st lieutenant (second-in-command) of the old H-class submarine HMS H43, engaged in landing secret agents on Guernsey. He was appointed as second-in-command of the new submarine HMS Triumph in July 1940, but was selected for the Commanding Officers' Qualifying Course before he saw active service. The course, still run, is known as the "perisher" due to its high failure rate, and that failure means an end to a career on submarines. He passed and was returned to the 10th Submarine Flotilla on Malta as a "spare" commanding officer, to cover for illness or injury.

McGeoch took command of HMS Ursula on one patrol, but was not confident in his own abilities, so, unusually, elected to return to England to take the "perisher" a second time. He passed again, and took command of the new S-class submarine P228, just launched at Chatham Dockyard on 13 January 1942. He and his brand new ship (named HMS Splendid January 1943) were posted to Gibraltar to take part in Operation Torch, and then back to Malta.

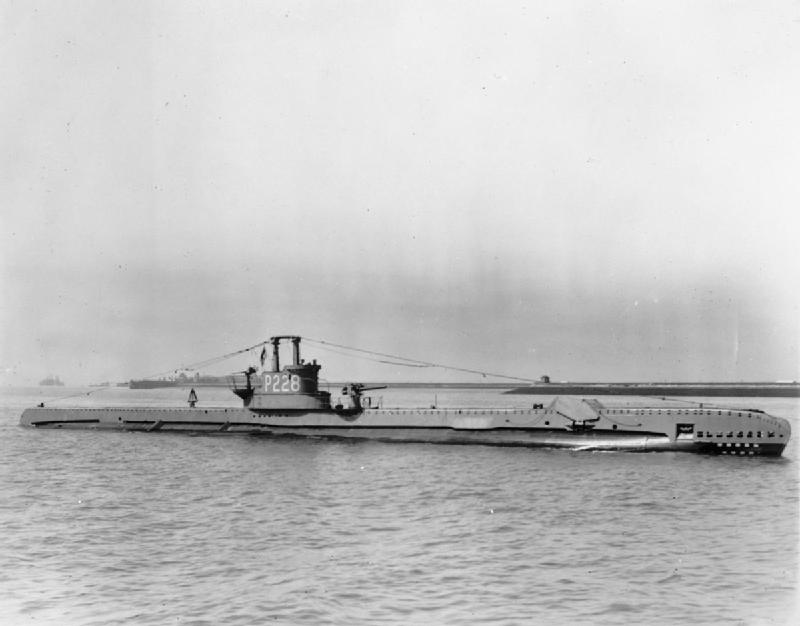
HMS Splendid, photographed on 18 August 1942, ten days after she was commissioned.

From November 1942 to May 1943 (the Operation Torch landings to the defeat of Axis forces in North Africa), Splendid sank more tonnage on its six patrols than any other submarine. Lieutenant McGeoch was awarded the DSO after his fourth patrol, and the DSC after his fifth. Under McGeoch's command, Splendid sank the Italian auxiliary submarine chaser San Paolo, the Italian merchants Luigi Favorita, Devoli, and XXI Aprile, the small Italian merchant Commercio, the Italian auxiliary minesweeper No. 107 / Cleopatra, and the Italian tanker Giorgio.

Splendid also sank the Italian Soldati-class destroyer Aviere, escorting the German transport ship Ankara with her sister ship Camicia Nera - Splendid also attacked Ankara, but missed her. Splendid also sank the Italian merchant Emma, despite her being heavily escorted by the Italian torpedo boats Groppo, Uragano and Clio. The German merchant Sienna (the former French Astrée) was missed in the same attack. Splendid also torpedoed and damaged the Italian destroyer Velite.

Splendid left Malta for the last time on 17 April 1943. Her sixth patrol would take her to the waters off Naples and Corsica. Off Capri on 21 April 1943, she ran into the German destroyer Hermes (formerly the British-built Greek destroyer Vasilefs Georgios). Splendid's periscope was spotted in the calm conditions in the Tyrrhenian Sea. Three accurately-dropped patterns of depth charges forced Splendid to the surface, where McGeoch ordered the crew to abandon ship and scuttled the vessel. Five officers, including McGeoch, and 25 ratings were picked up; 18 men were lost with the ship. McGeoch suffered a wound to his right eye, and never recovered its sight.

McGeoch and the other survivors from her crew became prisoners of war in Italy. Despite blindness in one eye, McGeoch nevertheless made several escape attempts. After the surrender of Fascist Italy in September 1943, he was able to walk out of the camp gate and travelled 400 miles (600 km) to Switzerland, where a metal fragment was removed from his sightless right eye. He travelled across occupied south France in December 1943 to Spain. He was interned in Figueres, but British diplomats arranged for his release to Gibraltar, and he returned to England on the old battleship HMS Centurion. His escape won him a mention in dispatches.

Returning to duty, McGeoch attended the Naval Staff Course in 1944. Promoted to lieutenant commander, he became Staff Officer (Operations) for the 4th Cruiser Squadron in the British Pacific Fleet in the run up to the surrender of Japan on 2 September 1945.

== Post-war career ==
After helping to repatriate British prisoners of war, he returned to the United Kingdom in 1946 to take command of the Hunt-class destroyer HMS Fernie. Promoted to commander in 1947, he worked in operations in the Admiralty, commanded the 4th Submarine Squadron in Sydney from 1949. Promoted to captain on 30 June 1955, he served as naval liaison officer to RAF Coastal Command in 1955 and 1956, and commanded the 3rd Submarine Squadron in 1957 and 1958. He became Director of Undersurface Warfare in the Admiralty for two years, then studied at the Imperial Defence College in 1961. He commanded the cruiser HMS Lion from 1962 to 1964.

Promoted to rear-admiral in 1964, he became Admiral President of the Royal Naval College, Greenwich. He then served as Flag Officer Submarines (FOSM) from May 1965 to December 1967. During his time in this post, HMS Valiant - the Royal Navy's second nuclear attack submarine (and the first all-British) - was launched, as was the first Polaris ballistic missile submarine, HMS Resolution.

Promoted to vice-admiral in 1967, he became Flag Officer Scotland and Northern Ireland (FOSNI). He was appointed CB in 1966 and advanced to KCB in 1969. He retired in 1970.

== Later life ==
He studied social sciences at the University of Edinburgh from 1970, and received an MPhil in 1975 after the direction of historian Professor John Erickson, writing a thesis on the origins, procurement and effect of the Polaris programme. He edited the Naval Review from 1972 to 1980. He worked with other senior officers, including General Sir John Hackett, on The Third World War: The Untold Story (1978 and 1982). He published a memoir of his wartime service, An Affair of Chances: a Submariner's Odyssey, 1939-44 in 1991, and his biography of Earl Mountbatten of Burma, entitled Earl Mountbatten, The Princely Sailor, was published in 1996.

He was a member of the Royal Company of Archers (the Queen's Bodyguard in Scotland) from 1969 to 2003. He was also a member of Royal Institute of Navigation, the Nautical Institute, the Honourable Company of Master Mariners, and the Royal Yacht Squadron. He was a trustee of the Imperial War Museum.

He married Eleanor Somers Farrie in 1937, the daughter of the Anglican vicar of Sliema. They had two daughters and two sons.

He died on 12 August 2007 and was survived by his wife and children.

Military offices
Preceded by Morgan Morgan-Giles	President, Royal Naval College, Greenwich; 1964–1965	Succeeded by Patrick Bayly
Preceded by Horace Law	Flag Officer Submarines; 1965–1967	Succeeded by Sir Michael Pollock
Preceded by Sir John Hayes	Flag Officer, Scotland and Northern Ireland; 1968–1970	Succeeded by David Dunbar-Nasmith
