= Italian destroyer Vittorio Alfieri =

Destroyer of the Regia Marina

History

Kingdom of Italy
- Name: Vittorio Alfieri
- Namesake: Vittorio Alfieri
- Builder: O.T.O., Livorno
- Laid down: 4 April 1935
- Launched: 20 December 1936
- Completed: 1 December 1937
- Fate: Sunk during the Battle of Cape Matapan, 28 March 1941

General characteristics (as built)
- Class & type: Oriani-class destroyer
- Displacement: 1,700–1,750 long tons (1,730–1,780 t) (standard); 2,400–2,450 long tons (2,440–2,490 t) (full load)
- Length: 106.7 m (350 ft 1 in) (o/a)
- Beam: 10.15 m (33 ft 4 in)
- Draught: 3.42–4.8 m (11 ft 3 in – 15 ft 9 in)
- Installed power: 3 Thornycroft boilers; 48,000 hp (36,000 kW)
- Propulsion: 2 shafts; 2 geared steam turbines
- Speed: 33 knots (61 km/h; 38 mph)
- Range: 2,600–2,800 nmi (4,800–5,200 km; 3,000–3,200 mi) at 18 knots (33 km/h; 21 mph)
- Complement: 207
- Armament: 2 × twin 120 mm (4.7 in) guns; 2 × single 120 mm (4.7 in) star shell guns; 4 × twin 13.2 mm (0.52 in) machine guns; 2 × triple 533 mm (21 in) torpedo tubes; 56 mines

Vittorio Alfieri was one of four Oriani-class destroyers built for the Regia Marina (Royal Italian Navy) in the mid-1930s. Completed in 1937, she served in World War II. She was sunk at the battle of Matapan on 28 March 1941 with the loss of 211 of her 246 crew including her commanding officer, Captain Salvatore Toscano.

== Design and description ==
The Oriani-class destroyers were slightly improved versions of the preceding Maestrale class. They had a length between perpendiculars of 101.6 meters (333 ft 4 in) and an overall length of 106.7 meters (350 ft 1 in). The ships had a beam of 10.15 meters (33 ft 4 in) and a mean draft of 3.15 meters (10 ft 4 in) and 4.3 meters (14 ft 1 in) at deep load. They displaced 1,700–1,750 metric tons (1,670–1,720 long tons) at normal load, and 2,400–2,450 metric tons (2,360–2,410 long tons) at deep load. Their complement during wartime was 206 officers and enlisted men.

The Orianis were powered by two Parsons geared steam turbines, each driving one propeller shaft using steam supplied by three Thornycroft boilers. Designed for a maximum output of 48,000 shaft horsepower (36,000 kW) and a speed of 32–33 knots (59–61 km/h; 37–38 mph) in service, the ships reached speeds of 38–39 knots (70–72 km/h; 44–45 mph) during their sea trials while lightly loaded. They carried enough fuel oil to give them a range of 2,600–2,800 nautical miles (4,800–5,200 km; 3,000–3,200 mi) at a speed of 18 knots (33 km/h; 21 mph) and 690 nmi (1,280 km; 790 mi) at a speed of 33 knots (61 km/h; 38 mph).

Their main battery consisted of four 50-caliber 120-millimeter (4.7 in) guns in two twin-gun turrets, one each fore and aft of the superstructure. Amidships were a pair of 15-caliber 120-millimeter star shell guns. Anti-aircraft (AA) defense for the Oriani-class ships was provided by four 13.2-millimeter (0.52 in) machine guns. The ships were equipped with six 533-millimeter (21 in) torpedo tubes in two triple mounts amidships. Although they were not provided with a sonar system for anti-submarine work, they were fitted with a pair of depth charge throwers. The ships could carry 56 mines.

== Bibliography ==
- Brescia, Maurizio (2012). Mussolini's Navy: A Reference Guide to the Regina Marina 1930–45. Annapolis, Maryland: Naval Institute Press. ISBN 978-1-59114-544-8.
- Fraccaroli, Aldo (1968). Italian Warships of World War II. Shepperton, UK: Ian Allan. ISBN 0-7110-0002-6.
- Roberts, John (1980). "Italy". In Chesneau, Roger (ed.). Conway's All the World's Fighting Ships 1922–1946. New York: Mayflower Books. pp. 280–317. ISBN 0-8317-0303-2.
- Rohwer, Jürgen (2005). Chronology of the War at Sea 1939–1945: The Naval History of World War Two (Third Revised ed.). Annapolis, Maryland: Naval Institute Press. ISBN 1-59114-119-2.
- Whitley, M. J. (1988). Destroyers of World War 2: An International Encyclopedia. Annapolis, Maryland: Naval Institute Press. ISBN 1-85409-521-8.
