= Italian destroyer Geniere =

Geniere has been borne by at least two ships of the Italian Navy and may refer to:

- Italian destroyer Geniere (1938), a Soldati-class destroyer launched in 1938 and destroyed in 1943.
- Italian destroyer Geniere (D 555), a Fletcher-class destroyer launched in 1942 as USS Prichett and transferred to Italy in 1970. She was scrapped in 1975.
