= HMS Splendid (P228) =

Submarine

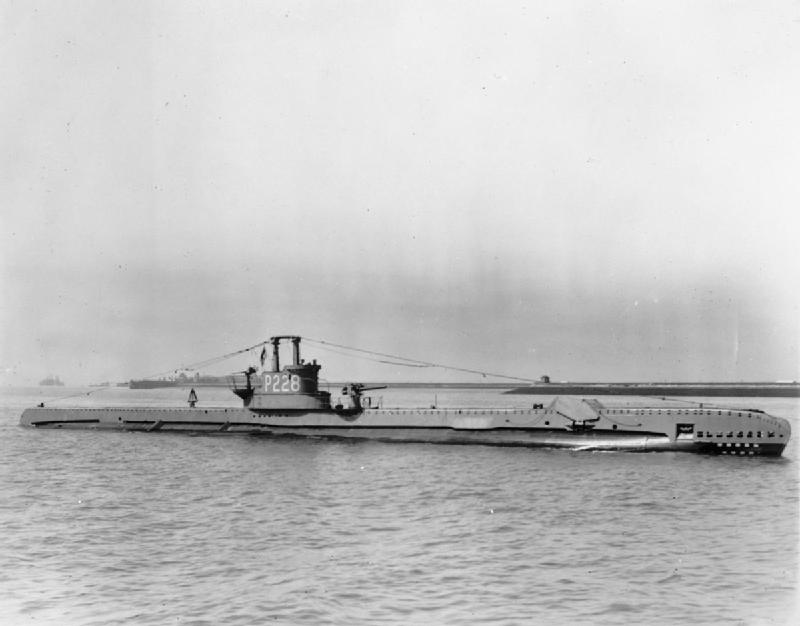
- Splendid underway off Sheerness on 18 August 1942, ten days after she was commissioned

History

United Kingdom
- Name: Splendid
- Builder: Chatham Dockyard
- Laid down: 7 March 1941
- Launched: 19 January 1942
- Commissioned: 8 August 1942
- Motto: Splendidly Audacious
- Fate: Scuttled, 21 April 1943
- Badge

General characteristics
- Class & type: S-class submarine
- Displacement: 865 long tons (879 t) (surfaced); 990 long tons (1,010 t) (submerged)
- Length: 217 ft (66.1 m)
- Beam: 23 ft 9 in (7.2 m)
- Draught: 14 ft 8 in (4.5 m)
- Installed power: 1,900 bhp (1,400 kW) (diesel); 1,300 hp (970 kW) (electric)
- Propulsion: 2 × diesel engines; 2 × electric motors
- Speed: 15 kn (28 km/h; 17 mph) (surfaced); 10 kn (19 km/h; 12 mph) (submerged)
- Range: 6,000 nmi (11,000 km; 6,900 mi) at 10 knots (19 km/h; 12 mph) (surfaced); 120 nmi (220 km; 140 mi) at 3 knots (5.6 km/h; 3.5 mph) (submerged)
- Test depth: 300 ft (91.4 m)
- Complement: 48
- Sensors & processing systems: Type 129AR or 138 ASDIC; Type 291 early-warning radar
- Armament: 7 × 21 in (533 mm) torpedo tubes (6 × bow, 1 × stern); 1 × 3 in (76 mm) deck gun; 1 × 20 mm (0.8 in) AA gun

HMS Splendid was a third-batch S-class submarine built for the Royal Navy during World War II. She was laid down on 7 March 1941 and launched on 19 January 1942. After an initial patrol through the Bay of Biscay to Gibraltar, Splendid conducted two patrols in the Mediterranean Sea; one was abandoned after technical problems and on the other she sank two Italian ships. On her next patrol, the submarine attacked two Italian convoys, sinking an Italian destroyer in the second attack. Based in Algiers, the boat operated north of Sicily, sinking six Italian ships, including two tankers and two heavy merchant ships. Splendid was detected by a German destroyer on 21 April 1943 while patrolling off Naples, Italy; the submarine was attacked with depth charges by the destroyer and forced to surface, after which she was scuttled and her surviving crew members taken prisoner. She was the most successful British submarine by tonnage sunk between November 1942 and May 1943.

== Design and description ==
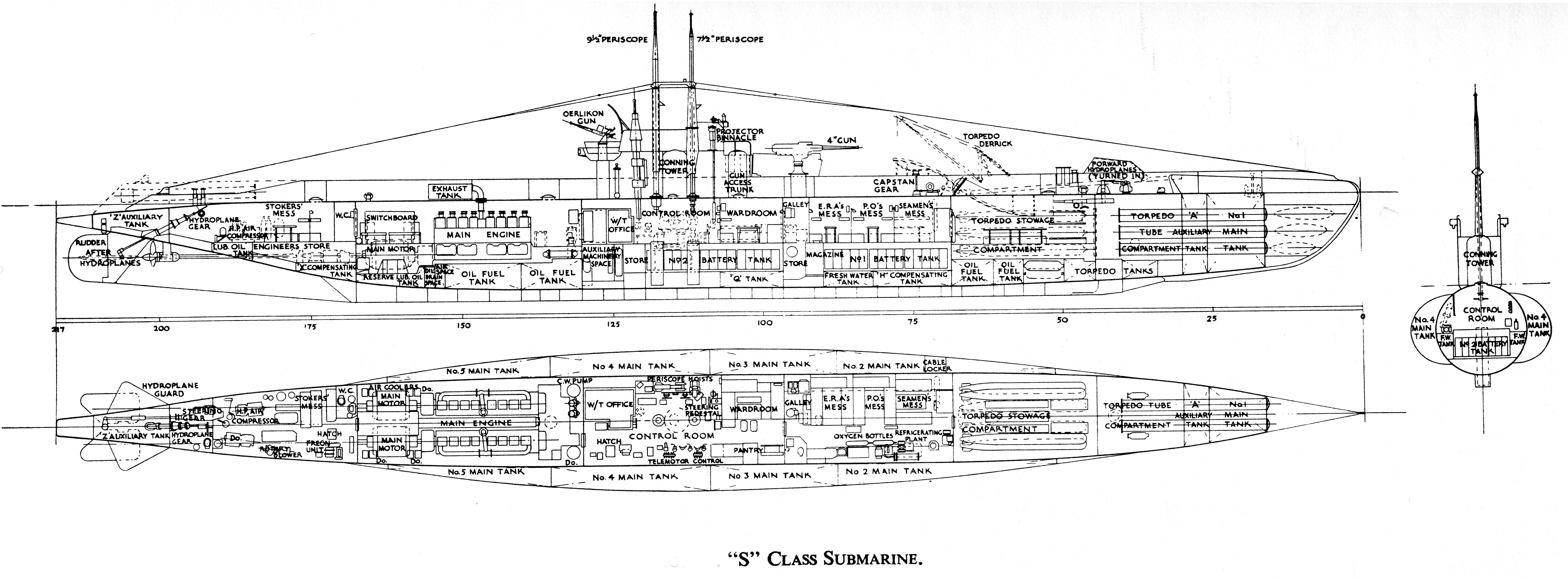
Schematic drawing of a S-class submarine

The S-class submarines were designed to patrol the restricted waters of the North Sea and the Mediterranean Sea. The third batch was slightly enlarged and improved over the preceding second batch of the S class. The submarines had a length of 217 feet (66.1 m) overall, a beam of 23 feet 9 inches (7.2 m) and a draught of 14 feet 8 inches (4.5 m). They displaced 865 long tons (879 t) on the surface and 990 long tons (1,010 t) submerged. The S-class submarines had a crew of 48 officers and ratings. They had a diving depth of 300 feet (91 m).

For surface running, the boats were powered by two 950-brake-horsepower (708 kW) diesel engines, each driving one propeller shaft. When submerged each propeller was driven by a 650-horsepower (485 kW) electric motor. They could reach 15 knots (28 km/h; 17 mph) on the surface and 10 knots (19 km/h; 12 mph) underwater. On the surface, the third-batch boats had a range of 6,000 nautical miles (11,000 km; 6,900 mi) at 10 knots (19 km/h; 12 mph) and 120 nmi (220 km; 140 mi) at 3 knots (5.6 km/h; 3.5 mph) submerged.

The boats were armed with six 21-inch (533 mm) torpedo tubes in the bow, and one external tube mounted in the stern. They carried six reload torpedoes for the bow tubes for a total of thirteen torpedoes. Twelve mines could be carried in lieu of the internally stowed torpedoes. They also had a 3-inch (76 mm) deck gun. It is uncertain if Splendid was completed with a 20-millimetre (0.8 in) Oerlikon light AA gun or had one added later. The third-batch S-class boats were fitted with either a Type 129AR or 138 ASDIC system and a Type 291 or 291W early-warning radar.

== Construction and career ==
HMS Splendid was a third-group S-class submarine and was ordered as part of the 1941 Naval Programme on 14 October 1940. She was laid down in the Chatham Dockyard on 7 March 1941 and launched on 19 January 1942. On 8 August 1942, Splendid, under the command of Lieutenant Ian McGeoch, was commissioned into the Royal Navy. Splendid was the third Royal Navy ship with this name.

After a period of training, Splendid departed Holy Loch on 3 October 1942, together with her sister ship, HMS Sibyl. After ten days at sea, Splendid spotted smoke shortly after midday and gave chase to the unidentified ship; four hours later, she stopped and boarded the vessel, which turned out to be the Allied Gaizka, running behind schedule. Later in the day, the submarine spotted a U-boat, but could not identify it and did not attack. Splendid safely arrived in Gibraltar on 16 October.

=== Gibraltar ===
Splendid left Gibraltar on 31 October to patrol off Toulon, France; however, the boat encountered problems with her aft diving planes and had to return to port and abandon the patrol.

The submarine again departed port on 7 November to patrol off Toulon; she was transferred the following week to operate off Naples instead. On 16 November, Splendid fired six torpedoes at a German U-boat, but missed. Later that day, the British submarine surfaced and sank with gunfire the Italian anti-submarine schooner San Paolo northwest of Gorgona, Italy. Splendid fired her six remaining bow torpedoes at the Italian submarine Aradam on 20 November, but all missed. The next day, the boat attacked the Italian Soldati-class destroyer Velite with her single unreloadable aft torpedo; the plan was to surface once the destroyer was sunk and engage the merchant ships with the deck gun on the surface. The torpedo hit and damaged Velite, but the unexpected presence of two additional destroyers foiled the planned surface attack. While returning from her patrol on 23 November, Splendid encountered the Italian merchant Favorita northwest of Sardinia and sank her with gunfire on the surface, having expended all of her torpedoes. The submarine finally ended her patrol on 28 November.

On 8 December, Splendid started another patrol, north of Tunisia. On 14 December, the boat attacked an Italian convoy with four torpedoes and claimed a hit; this was not the case, as a few hours later both merchant ships in the convoy were sunk by HMS Sahib and HMS Unruffled. On 17 December, Splendid sighted another convoy and fired six torpedoes at the heavy German transport Ankara; one torpedo passed 10 metres (33 ft) in front of the ship's bow and another 13 metres (43 ft) behind the ship's stern. The Italian destroyer Aviere was less lucky and was hit twice, going down in ten seconds with 220 dead. The British submarine HMS Saracen observed the attack and confirmed the sinking. Splendid fired her last working torpedo at the Italian submarine Galatea, but missed. The boat then ended her patrol in Algiers on Christmas 1942.

=== Algiers ===
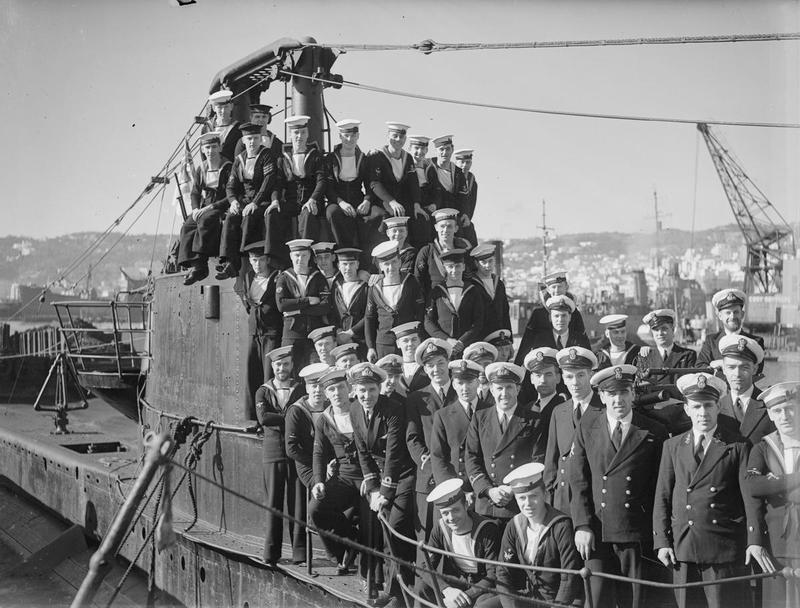
Ship's company of HMS Splendid, Algiers, 7–10 February 1943

Splendid's next patrol started on 5 January 1943, operating off Sardinia. After patrolling for four days, the boat landed two Special Operations Executive men on Sardinia's eastern coast. The submarine was then ordered to patrol off Naples instead, and set course for her new patrol area. On 15 January, Splendid sighted an Italian convoy and fired five torpedoes at the merchant ship Emma, which was transporting 950 tons of supplies and ten tanks. One torpedo hit, and the merchant ship was stopped dead in the water. However, the ship did not sink, and the submarine stayed close by to attack the ship again in daylight. During the night, the Italian ships attempted to tow Emma, but could not due to rough seas, and the submarine attacked the next morning with one torpedo, which sank the ship. A brief counter-attack with depth charges followed, but Splendid evaded the destroyers and was not damaged. The submarine later sank the Italian minesweeper Cleopatra with gunfire east of Sardinia, then damaged the armed trawler Violette with gunfire, and went on to sink the Italian merchant Commercio with torpedoes on the same day, 19 January. Splendid returned to Algiers on 22 January.

On 13 February, the boat departed Algiers again for another patrol in the same area as before, north of Sicily. Splendid sighted an Italian convoy on 17 February and sank the Italian merchant ship XXI Aprile, which was laden with 300 tons of ammunition, 150 tons of supplies, and 50 motorised vehicles. One week later, the submarine attacked another Italian convoy, expending all her torpedoes, but did not sink any ships. Splendid ended her patrol on 28 February in Algiers.

Splendid commenced another patrol on 11 March, north of Sicily as in previous patrols. After patrolling for five days, the boat sank the heavily escorted Italian tanker Devoli, then sank the tanker Giorgio four days later northeast of Cefalù, Sicily. The submarine ended patrol in Malta on 28 March. Splendid's commanding officer, Lieutenant McGeoch, was awarded the Distinguished Service Order following this patrol. Between her first patrol in the Mediterranean in November 1942 and her sinking on 21 April 1943, Splendid was the most successful British submarine in total tonnage sunk between the invasion of French North Africa, codenamed Operation Torch, in November 1942 and the surrender of Axis forces in Tunisia in May 1943.

=== Sinking ===
Location of Splendid's wreck

Splendid departed Malta on 18 April 1943 for a patrol off Naples which was her last. Three days later the submarine's periscope was spotted by the German destroyer Hermes, which also detected the submarine on sonar. Hermes was the largest German ship in the Mediterranean Sea except for auxiliary minesweepers. The destroyer made three attack runs with depth charges, dropping 41 in total; Splendid attempted to escape by diving to 500 feet (150 m), but the last eleven depth charges started leaks inside the submarine's pressure hull, and the boat was forced to surface. She was fired upon by the destroyer's surface guns, which killed 18 crew members and wounded the commanding officer. Splendid was scuttled to prevent her capture by enemy forces, and her surviving crew were imprisoned in Italian prisoner-of-war camps. Splendid's commander, Ian McGeoch, despite having lost the use of one eye during the submarine's sinking, made two escape attempts, the second of which was successful; he arrived in Switzerland to have a metal splinter removed from his eye, then travelled through France and Spain to England.

== Summary of raiding history ==
During her service with the Royal Navy, Splendid sank eight Axis ships as well as the an Italian destroyer Aviere for a total of 25,234 GRT.

| Date | Name of ship | Tonnage | Nationality | Fate and location |
|---|---|---|---|---|
| 16 November 1942 | San Paolo | 209 | Kingdom of Italy | Sunk with gunfire at 43°34′N 09°37′E |
| 23 November 1942 | Favorita | 3,576 | Kingdom of Italy | Sunk with gunfire at 39°00′N 11°11′E |
| 17 December 1942 | Aviere | – | Kingdom of Italy | Italian warship torpedoed and sunk at 37°53′N 10°05′E |
| 16 January 1943 | Emma | 7,931 | Kingdom of Italy | Torpedoed and sunk 40°25′N 13°56′E |
| 19 January 1943 | Cleopatra | 72 | Kingdom of Italy | Sunk with gunfire 39°41′N 09°43′E |
| 19 January 1943 | Commercio | 766 | Kingdom of Italy | Torpedoed and sunk 40°25′N 13°56′E |
| 13 February 1943 | XXI Aprile | 4,787 | Kingdom of Italy | Torpedoed and sunk 38°13′N 12°43′E |
| 17 March 1943 | Devoli | 3,006 | Kingdom of Italy | Torpedoed and sunk 38°13′N 12°43′E |
| 21 March 1943 | Giorgio | 4,887 | Kingdom of Italy | Torpedoed and sunk 38°05′N 14°10′E |
