= Soldati-class destroyer =

Italian navy destroyer ship class

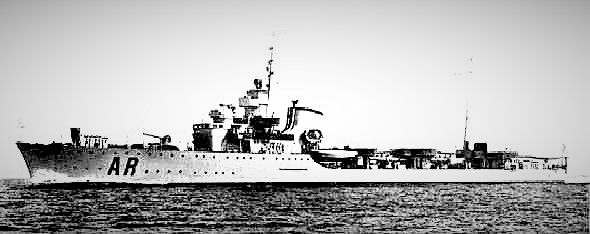
- Artigliere

Class overview
- Name: Soldati class
- Operators: Regia Marina; Marina Militare; Marine nationale; Soviet Navy
- Preceded by: Oriani class
- Succeeded by: Comandanti Medaglie d'Oro class (planned); San Giorgio class / Artigliere class (actual)
- Built: 1938–1943
- In commission: 1939–1965
- Planned: 19
- Completed: 17
- Canceled: 2
- Lost: 10

General characteristics (1st batch, as built)
- Type: Destroyer
- Displacement: 1,820–1,850 long tons (1,850–1,880 t) (standard); 2,450–2,550 long tons (2,490–2,590 t) (full load)
- Length: 106.7 m (350 ft 1 in) (o/a); 101.6 m (333 ft 4 in) (pp)
- Beam: 10.15 m (33 ft 4 in)
- Draught: 3.15–4.3 m (10 ft 4 in – 14 ft 1 in)
- Installed power: 3 Yarrow boilers; 48,000 shp (36,000 kW)
- Propulsion: 2 shafts; 2 geared steam turbines
- Speed: 34–35 knots (63–65 km/h; 39–40 mph)
- Range: 2,340 nmi (4,330 km; 2,690 mi) at 14 knots (26 km/h; 16 mph)
- Complement: 206
- Armament: 2 × twin 120 mm (4.7 in) guns; 1 × 120 mm (4.7 in) star shell gun; 8 × 20 mm (0.8 in) AA guns; 2 × triple 533 mm (21 in) torpedo tubes; 2 × depth charge throwers; 48 mines

The Soldati class (also known as Camicia Nera class, meaning Blackshirt) were a group of destroyers built for the Regia Marina (Royal Italian Navy) during World War II. The ships were named after military professions (Artigliere, for example, meaning gunner). There were two batches; twelve ships were built in 1938–1939 and a second batch of seven ships were ordered in 1940, although only five were completed.

Ten ships of the class were lost during the war. Three of the survivors were transferred to the French Navy and two to the Soviet Navy as war reparations, while two served in the Italian post-war navy, the Marina Militare.

== Design ==
In 1936, the Italian Regia Marina placed an order for twelve examples of a new destroyer design, the Soldati class. The design was essentially a repeat of the previous Oriani destroyer design, which was itself a development of the Maestrale class. The design featured an identical main gun armament of four 120 mm/50 calibre guns in two twin turrets, one forward and one aft, while torpedo armament was two triple 21-inch (533 mm) torpedo tubes. A short (15 calibre) 120 mm gun was mounted on a pedestal between the banks of torpedo tubes for firing starshell, while the anti-aircraft armament consisted of twelve 13.2 mm (0.52 in) machine guns. Carabiniere was completed with a fifth 120 mm 50 calibre gun replacing the star shell gun. The ships' powerplant, with two geared steam turbines driving two shafts and generating 48,000 shaft horsepower (36,000 kW), and with one large funnel, was similar to that in the Oriani class and was sufficient to propel the destroyers to 38 knots (70 km/h; 44 mph).

Orders for a second batch of seven destroyers were placed in 1940. All except one of these ships were to carry the five main gun armament of Carabiniere. (Note: Velite was completed with the star shell gun.)

== Construction and modifications ==
The first batch of ships were laid down in 1937, being completed between 1938 and 1939, with the second batch being laid down in 1940–1941, with five completing in 1942.

Four more of the first batch (Ascari, Camicia Nera, Geniere and Lanciere) were modified in 1941–1942 by replacing the star shell gun with a full power 120 mm gun. The anti-aircraft machine guns were gradually replaced by 20 mm cannon, with up to 10–12 being fitted by 1943. Five ships (Carabiniere, Granatiere, Fuciliere, Legionario and Velite) had the aft set of torpedo tubes replaced by two 37 mm (1.5 in) 54 cal. guns, while Fuciliere and Velite also had their star shell guns replaced by a further pair of 37 mm cannon. Fuciliere and Velite were fitted with Italian radar, while Legionario was fitted with a German radar.

The Germans captured Squadrista incomplete in September 1943, and transferred the ship, renamed TA33, to Genoa for completion as a fighter direction ship carrying a long-range Freya radar and German 105 mm and 20 mm guns, but she was sunk by Allied bombing in 1944.

The two destroyers remaining in Italian service after the war were rebuilt as anti-submarine escorts in 1953–1954, with their torpedo tubes removed and the anti-aircraft armament changed to six 40 mm/39 pom-pom guns.

== Ships ==
=== Batch 1 ===
Construction data for Batch 1
Ship	Hull letters	Builder	Laid down	Launched	Commissioned	Fate
Alpino	AP	CNR, Ancona	2 May 1937	18 September 1938	20 April 1939	Lost after bombing by USAAF aircraft in La Spezia Harbour, 19 April 1943
Artigliere	AR	O.T.O., Livorno	15 February 1937	12 December 1937	14 November 1938	Lost 13 October 1940, sunk by HMS York after being damaged at the Battle of Cape Passero the previous day. The wreck was discovered in 2017.
Ascari	AI	O.T.O., Livorno	11 December 1937	31 July 1938	6 May 1939	Sank 24 March 1943 after striking three mines
Aviere	AV	O.T.O., Livorno	16 January 1937	19 September 1937	31 August 1937	Torpedoed and sunk by the British submarine HMS Splendid on 17 December 1942
Bersagliere	BG	CNR, Palermo	21 April 1937	3 July 1938	1 April 1939	Lost after being bombed in Palermo harbour, 7 January 1943;
Camicia Nera (later Artigliere)	CN (AR)	O.T.O., Livorno	21 January 1937	8 August 1937	30 June 1938	Renamed Artigliere, 30 July 1943; survived the war, given to the Soviet Navy as war reparations as Lovky (Russian: Ловкий); retired 1960
Carabiniere	CB	CT, Riva Trigoso	1 February 1937	23 July 1938	20 December 1938	Survived the war and served in the post war Italian Navy (Marina Militare), decommissioned, 18 January 1965
Corazziere	CZ (CR)	O.T.O., Livorno	7 October 1937	22 May 1938	4 March 1939	Scuttled at Genoa following Italian Armistice, 9 September 1943; raised by Germans but sunk by air raid, 4 Sep 1944
Fuciliere	FC	CNR, Ancona	2 May 1937	31 July 1938	10 January 1939	Survived the war, given to the Soviet Navy as war reparations, serving as Lyogky (Russian: Лёгкий); retired 1960
Geniere	GE	O.T.O., Livorno	26 August 1937	27 February 1938	14 December 1938	Sunk by USAAF bombing while in drydock in Palermo, 1 March 1943
Granatiere	GN	CNR, Palermo	5 April 1937	24 April 1938	1 February 1939	Survived the war and served in the post war Italian Navy; stricken 1 July 1958
Lanciere	LN	CT, Riva Trigoso	1 February 1937	18 December 1938	25 March 1939	Capsized and sank in heavy storm following Second Battle of Sirte, 23 March 1942

=== Batch 2 ===
Construction data for Batch 2
Ship	Hull letters	Builder	Laid down	Launched	Commissioned	Fate
Bombardiere	BR	CNR, Ancona	7 October 1940	23 March 1942	15 July 1942	Sunk 17 January 1943 by HMS United
Carrista	CR	O.T.O., Livorno	11 September 1941	N/A		Captured on slipway by Germans following Italian armistice; given prospective name TA34 but scrapped incomplete. (Note: German naval historian Erich Gröner states that no TA number was allotted to Carrista by the Kriegsmarine.)
Corsaro	CA	O.T.O., Livorno	23 January 1941	16 November 1941	16 May 1942	Sunk by mines laid by HMS Abdiel, 9 January 1943
Legionario	LG	O.T.O., Livorno	21 October 1940	16 April 1941	1 March 1942	Joined Allies 1943; transferred to France as war reparation, 15 August 1948; renamed Duchaffault; stricken 12 June 1954
Mitragliere	MT	CNR, Ancona	7 October 1940	28 September 1941	1 February 1942	Interned Mahón, Mallorca 1943; to Allies 1944; to France as Jurien de la Gravière, 8 Aug 1948; stricken 12 June 1954
Squadrista	SQ	O.T.O., Livorno	4 September 1941	12 September 1942	—N/a	Captured incomplete by Germany, September 1943; towed to Genoa for completion as TA33; sunk while undergoing trials at La Spezia, 4 September 1944
Velite	VL	O.T.O., Livorno	19 April 1941	31 August 1941	31 August 1942	Badly damaged by torpedo from submarine HMS P228, 21 November 1942; repaired and joined Allies, 1943; transferred to France as Duperré, 24 July 1948; stricken 1961

== Bibliography ==
- Brescia, Maurizio (2012). Mussolini's Navy: A Reference Guide to the Regina Marina 1930–45. Annapolis, Maryland: Naval Institute Press. ISBN 978-1-59114-544-8.
- Campbell, John (1985). Naval Weapons of World War Two. Annapolis, Maryland: Naval Institute Press. ISBN 0-87021-459-4.
- Fraccaroli, Aldo (1968). Italian Warships of World War II. Shepperton, UK: Ian Allan. ISBN 0-7110-0002-6.
- Gröner, Erich (1990). German Warships: 1815–1945. Vol. 1: Major Surface Warships. Annapolis, Maryland: Naval Institute Press. ISBN 0-87021-790-9.
- Roberts, John (1980). "Italy". In Chesneau, Roger (ed.). Conway's All the World's Fighting Ships 1922–1946. New York: Mayflower Books. pp. 280–317. ISBN 0-8317-0303-2.
- Rohwer, Jürgen (2005). Chronology of the War at Sea 1939–1945: The Naval History of World War Two (Third Revised ed.). Annapolis, Maryland: Naval Institute Press. ISBN 1-59114-119-2.
- Smigielski, Adam (1995). "Italy". In Chumbley, Stephen (ed.). Conway's All the World's Fighting Ships 1947-1995. Annapolis, Maryland: Naval Institute Press. pp. 195–218. ISBN 1-55750-132-7.
- Whitley, M. J. (1988). Destroyers of World War 2: An International Encyclopedia. Annapolis, Maryland: Naval Institute Press. ISBN 1-85409-521-8.
