= Salvatore Toscano =

Italian naval officer during World War II

- Born: 5 July 1897; Imola, Italy
- Died: 28 March 1941 (aged 43); Aegean Sea, off Cape Matapan
- Military career
- Allegiance: Kingdom of Italy
- Branch: Regia Marina
- Service years: 1915–1941
- Rank: Capitano di Vascello (Captain)
- Commands: Borea (destroyer); Luigi Cadorna (light cruiser); Duilio (battleship); Luigi di Savoia Duca degli Abruzzi (light cruiser); Vittorio Alfieri (destroyer); 9th Destroyer Squadron
- Conflicts: World War I World War II: Mediterranean War; Battle of Cape Matapan †
- Awards: Gold Medal of Military Valor (posthumous)

Salvatore Toscano (5 July 1897 – 28 March 1941) was an Italian naval officer during World War II.

== Biography ==
Toscano was born in Imola, province of Bologna, in 1897. After graduating as ensign from the Naval Academy of Livorno in 1915, he served on various ships during World War I, being promoted to lieutenant in 1918. In 1926 he was promoted to lieutenant commander and in 1932, after commanding the destroyer Borea for two years, he was promoted to commander and appointed vice deputy commander of the Naval Academy of Livorno.

In 1935 he was transferred to the Royal Hydrographic Institute of Genoa and in 1937 he was promoted to captain, holding in succession the command of the light cruiser Luigi Cadorna, the battleship Duilio and the light cruiser Luigi di Savoia Duca degli Abruzzi. In November 1938 he was appointed president of the Commission for the Experimentation of War Material (Mariperman) in La Spezia, and from 12 April 1940 to 10 March 1941 he served as Chief of Staff of the Naval Command of Messina.

He was then given command of the 9th Destroyer Squadron, with Vittorio Alfieri as flagship. A few weeks later, he participated in the battle of Cape Matapan, in which the 1st Naval Division, of which the 9th Destroyer Squadron was part, was annihilated by the battleships of the Mediterranean Fleet in a nocturnal engagement. Alfieri, under the command of Toscano, was the only Italian ship that was able to put up a reaction, firing her guns and some torpedoes at the attackers before being hit and disabled by British gunfire. Toscano then ordered the survivors to set off the scuttling charges and abandon ship; declining his subordinates' request to join them on the rafts, he withdrew to the bridge and went down with the ship. He was posthumously awarded the Gold Medal of Military Valor.
