= HMS Abdiel (M39) =

Royal Navy minelayer (1940)

Coordinates: 40°26′35″N 17°15′6″E

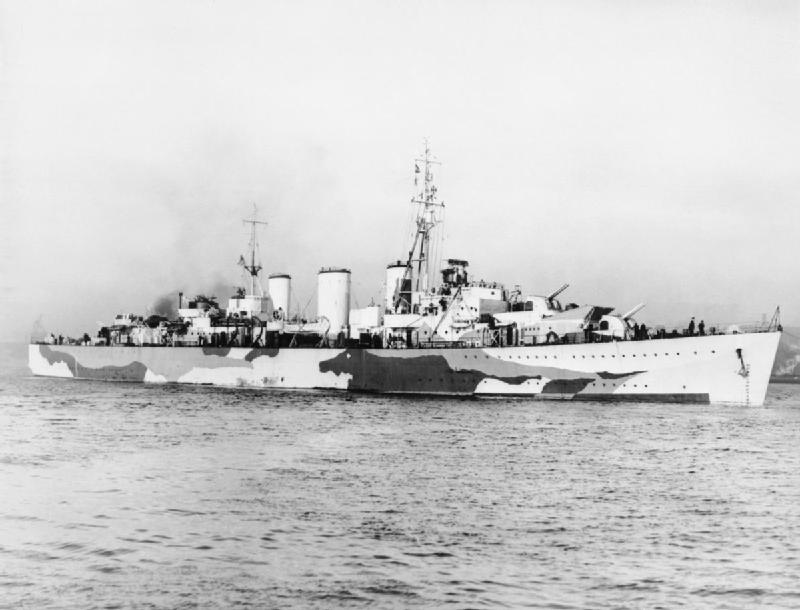

History

United Kingdom
- Name: HMS Abdiel
- Builder: J. Samuel White, Cowes
- Laid down: 29 March 1939
- Launched: 23 April 1940
- Commissioned: 15 April 1941
- Identification: Pennant number M39
- Honours and awards: BISCAY 1941, CRETE 1941, LIBYA 1941, SICILY 1943
- Fate: Lost, 10 September 1943

General characteristics
- Class & type: Abdiel-class minelayer
- Displacement: 2,650 tons (standard); 4,000 tons (full load)
- Length: 127.4 m (418 ft) (overall)
- Beam: 12.2 m (40 ft)
- Draught: 3.4 m (11 ft)
- Propulsion: Two shafts; Geared turbines; Four Admiralty 3-drum boilers; 72,000 shp
- Speed: 40 knots (74 km/h)
- Range: 5,800 mi (9,334 km) at 15 knots (28 km/h)
- Complement: 244
- Armament: As built: 6 × QF 4-inch (100 mm) Mark XVI guns on twin mounts HA/LA Mk.XIX; 4 × QF 2-pounder (40 mm) Mk.VIII on quadruple mount Mk.VII; 8 × 0.5-inch (12.7 mm) Vickers machine guns on quadruple mount Mk.I; 156 mines
- Armour: Magazine box protection, deck, side-plating, turrets and bulkheads, belt, internal boiler room sides (added 1936–1940).

HMS Abdiel was an Abdiel-class minelayer that served with the Royal Navy during World War II. She served with the Mediterranean Fleet (1941), Eastern Fleet (1942), Home Fleet (1942–43), and the Mediterranean Fleet (1943). Abdiel was sunk by German mines in Italy's Taranto harbour in 1943. Although designed as a fast minelayer her speed and capacity made her suitable for employment as a fast transport.

== Service ==
=== Channel ===
On 22 March 1941, Abdiel (Captain Hon. Edward Pleydell-Bouverie) had acceptance trials interrupted and was ordered to lay mines with the objective of preventing the German battleships Scharnhorst and Gneisenau breaking out from Brest. In operation 'GV', 'GX' and 'GY', Abdiel with the destroyers Intrepid, Impulsive and Icarus escorted by Kipling, Kelly and Jackal on 23 and 28 March laid mines in the vicinity of Little Sole Bank and 40 mi (64 km) WSW of Brest.

From 17 to 30 April 1941 Abdiel attempted to complete her trials programme but this was again abandoned when the ship was ordered to join the cruiser Dido and the destroyers Kelly, Kipling, Kelvin, Jackal and Jersey. This group was then transferred from Plymouth to Gibraltar, having loaded military stores destined for Malta. The ships subsequently joined the Mediterranean Fleet.

=== Mediterranean ===
On 24 to 28 April 1941 they formed part of "Operation Dunlop". Dido, Abdiel and destroyers Janus, Jervis and Nubian, having discharged naval stores at Malta, proceeded to Alexandria.

On 21 May 1941 Abdiel laid a field of 150 mines off Akra Dhoukaton (Cape Dukato, southern tip of Lefkada island, Ionian Sea). Later that day the Italian destroyer Carlo Mirabello (1,840 tons), was sunk on the minefield with the gunboat Pellegrino Matteucci and the German transports Kybfels (7,764 GRT) and Marburg (7,564 GRT) which were transporting a large contingent of the 2nd Panzer Division from Patras in Greece across the Adriatic Sea to the port of Taranto in Italy.

On the night of 26/27 May, Abdiel, escorted by the destroyer Hero and the Australian destroyer HMAS Nizam, landed 800 Commandos at Suda Bay. On 31 May 1941, Abdiel sailed from Alexandria for Sfakia, Crete with the light cruiser Phoebe and three destroyers. During the following night these ships removed 4,000 troops from Crete. Between December 1942 and April 1943 Abdiel, in cooperation with the mine laying submarine Rorqual and Abdiel's sister ship Welshman, laid several minefields with about 2,000 mines in the Strait of Sicily.

On 9 January 1943, after Abdiel laid a minefield across the Axis evacuation route from Tunisia, the escort of an Italian convoy ran into it and the destroyer Corsaro [1,645 long tons (1,671 t)] was sunk, while the destroyer Maestrale [1,440 long tons (1,460 t)] was severely damaged. On 3 February 1943 another Italian convoy's escort fouled another of her minefields south of Marettimo island, off the western tip of Sicily, losing the destroyer Saetta [1,225 long tons (1,245 t)] and the torpedo boat Uragano [910 long tons (920 t)].

On 8 March 1943, Abdiel again laid a minefield on the Axis evacuation route, 30 nmi (56 km; 35 mi) north of Cap Bon, Tunisia. On 24 March a convoy entered the field, and the Italian destroyers Ascari [1,645 long tons (1,671 t)] and Lanzerotto Malocello [2,125 long tons (2,159 t)] were lost. On 3 April 1943 Abdiel laid a minefield between the Italian fields X-2 and X-3, whose location was known to the Allies through Ultra intercepts and captured documents. On 7 March a convoy ran afoul the field, losing one of their escorts, the Italian torpedo boat Ciclone [910 long tons (920 t)].

== Sinking ==
Abdiel, was sunk by mines in Taranto harbour, Italy on 10 September 1943, during Operation Slapstick. The mines had been laid just a few hours earlier by two German torpedo boats (S-54 and S-61), as they left the harbour. Abdiel, carrying troops of the British 1st Airborne Division (6th (Royal Welch) Parachute Battalion and 204 (Oban) Anti-Tank Battery, Royal Artillery), took the berth which had been declined earlier by the captain of the US cruiser USS Boise. Shortly after midnight, two mines detonated beneath Abdiel and the minelayer sank in three minutes, with great loss of life among both sailors and soldiers. The 1st Airborne Division lost 58 dead and around 150 injured, the Derbyshire Yeomanry lost a member of Popski's Private Army, Lieutenant McGillavray, 48 crew were also lost. There is a rumour that the ship's degaussing equipment had been turned off to reduce noise and to allow troops to sleep better. Commander F. Ashe Lincoln QC RNVR gives a different cause in his book "Secret Naval Investigator" (Wm Kimber London 1961, and pp. 132–133 of the 2017 reprint). A naval mine clearance expert, he found in the Germans' Taranto magazine a number of large wooden wheels fitted with depth charges, with a timing clock and explosive charge in the centre. He says that one of these devices had been sunk next to the mooring buoy Abdiel used when the Germans evacuated the previous night.

== Bibliography ==
- Caruana, Joseph (2012). "Emergency Victualling of Malta During WWII". Warship International. LXIX (4): 357–364. ISSN 0043-0374.
- Nicholson, Arthur (2015). Very Special Ships: Abdiel-Class Fast Minelayers of World War Two. Barnsley, UK: Seaforth Publishing. ISBN 978-1-84832-235-6.
- Warlow, Ben, Lt. Cdr., Royal Navy (2004) Battle Honours of the Royal Navy, Maritime Books: Liskeard, UK ISBN 1-904459-05-6
