= HMS United =

Submarine of the Royal Navy

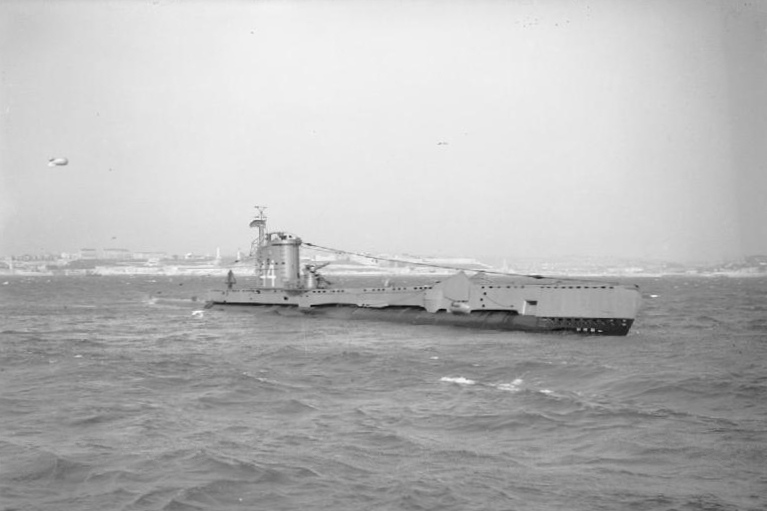
- HMS United underway in Plymouth Sound

History

United Kingdom
- Name: HMS United
- Builder: Vickers-Armstrongs, Barrow-in-Furness
- Laid down: 25 February 1941
- Launched: 18 December 1941
- Commissioned: 2 April 1942
- Fate: Scrapped February 1946
- Badge

General characteristics
- Class & type: U-class submarine
- Displacement: Surfaced - 540 tons Standard, 630 tons full load; Submerged - 730 tons
- Length: 58.22 m (191 ft)
- Beam: 4.90 m (16 ft 1 in)
- Draught: 4.62 m (15 ft 2 in)
- Propulsion: 2 shaft diesel-electric; 2 Paxman Ricardo diesel generators + electric motors; 615 / 825 hp
- Speed: 11.25 knots max surfaced; 10 knots max submerged
- Complement: 27-31
- Armament: 4 bow internal 21 inch (533 mm) torpedo tubes - 8 - 10 torpedoes; 1 - 3-inch (76 mm) gun

HMS United (P44) was a Royal Navy U-class submarine built by Vickers-Armstrongs at Barrow-in-Furness. So far she has been the only ship of the Royal Navy to bear the name United.

== Career ==
HMS United spent most of the war in the Mediterranean, where she sank the small Italian merchant Rostro, the Italian auxiliary submarine chaser V 39/Giovanna, the Italian destroyer Bombardiere, the French merchant Ste Marguerite (the former Norwegian Ringulv), and the Italian merchant Olbia. Whilst covering the Allied invasion of Sicily, United spotted the Italian transport submarine Remo on the surface. She launched four torpedoes, one of which hit the Remo amidships, sinking her within a few minutes. Only four survived, the three who were on the conning tower (amongst them the CO, Captain Vassallo), and Sergeant Dario Cortopassi who was able to come up from the control room. United also sank the Italian transport ship MS Rosolino Pilo, which had already been damaged in a previous attack by motor torpedo boats.

She also damaged the Italian tanker Petrarca, and further damaged the Italian merchant Ravenna. The Ravenna had been grounded after air attack and a fire on 29 September 1942. She also attacked the damaged Italian light cruiser Attilio Regolo, but missed her. The Attilio Regolo had lost her bow due to an attack the previous day by HMS Unruffled.

United survived the war and was scrapped at Troon from 12 February 1946.
