= Cantiere navale fratelli Orlando =

Historical Italian shipyard in Livorno

Coordinates: 43.5436°N 10.3004°E

- Industry: Shipbuilding
- Founded: 1861; 165 years ago
- Defunct: 2003; 23 years ago
- Fate: Absorbed
- Successor: Azimut-Benetti
- Headquarters: Livorno, Italy

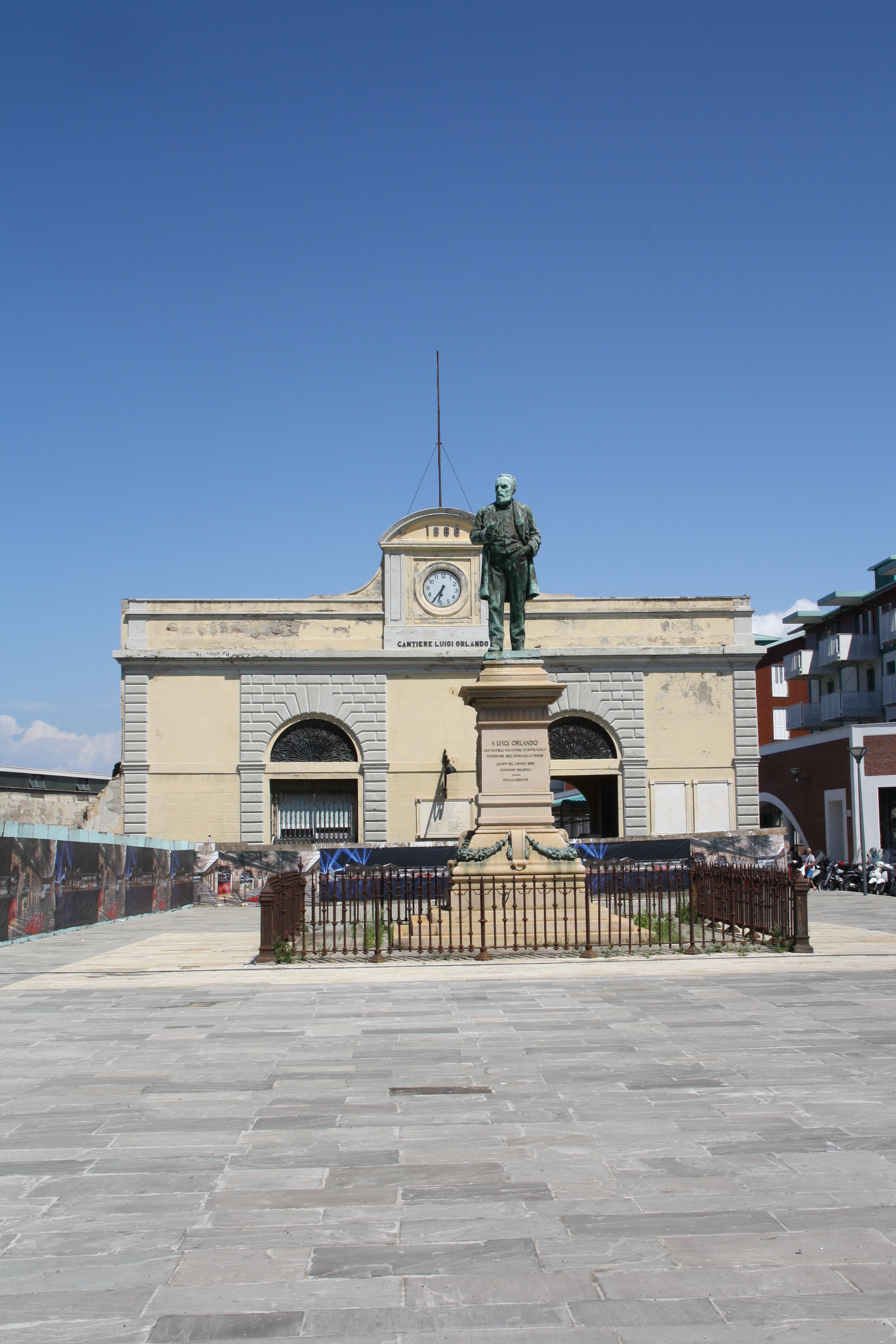
The historical gate of the shipyard and the statue of Luigi Orlando

Cantiere navale fratelli Orlando (Orlando Brothers Shipyard) is a historical Italian shipyard in Livorno.

== History ==
It was founded by Luigi Orlando and his brothers Giuseppe, Paolo and Salvatore who moved to Livorno from Genoa where in 1858 they had the management of Ansaldo which produced marine machines and cannons, in 1861 they directed the factory to the construction of ships.

=== Cantiere Navale Fratelli Orlando ===
Luigi Orlando on 31 August 1865 signed a thirty years concession for the buildings and the area of the former Lazzaretto di San Rocco (Saint Roch lazaret) which was transformed in an arsenal by Tommaso Mati in 1852. The shipyard entered into works the following year, and on July 29, 1867, the first ship was launched, the ironclad Conte Verde for the Regia Marina. The shipyard developed and built the gunboats Alfredo Cappellini (1868) and Faa di Bruno (1869) for the Regia Marina and on March 17, 1883 the most difficult launch was that of the ironclad Lepanto, on project by Benedetto Brin, because of the inadequacy of the dock. The Lepanto was entirely built by the shipyard in each part including the machineries and the armament. It was then decided to build the new Scalo Morosini (Morosini slipway) toward the entrance of the harbour in open sea to ease the launch of greater ships. The shipyard had 1,140 workers employed in 1886 and other 600 workers were occupied by Metallurgica Italiana founded by the Orlando Brothers and connected to the shipbuilding.

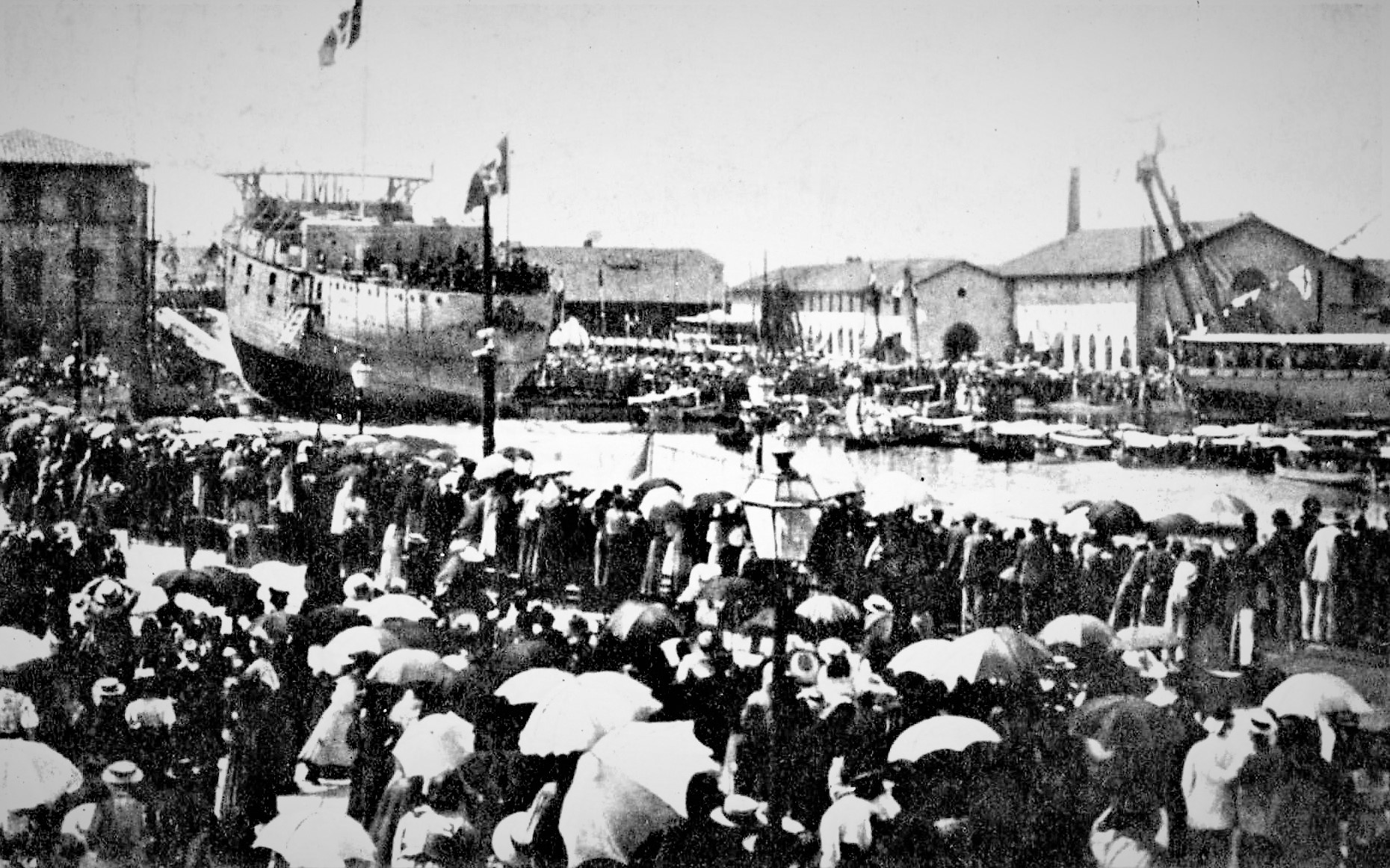
The launch of the cruiser Pisa from the Umbria slip

Luigi Orlando died on 14 June 1896, and the new management had to face a decrease in the production due to the markets. In 1904 the shipyard merged into the group Società degli Alti Forni, Fonderie e Acciaierie di Terni changing the denomination in “Cantiere Navale Fratelli Orlando & C.”. Until World War I, only few ships were built for the Regia Marina, among these the armored cruiser Varese (1899) and the Pisa (1907); the most part of the naval production was for the foreigner navy as the Argentinean General Belgrano (1896) and the armored cruiser Georgios Averof of the Royal Hellenic Navy built in 1911. Following the failure of the Cantieri Gallinari (Gallinari yard), the Orlando shipyard acquired the structures and the machineries enclosed the motor yacht Makook III for the Khedive of Egypt, which was modified respect to the Gallinari project. During World War I the shipyard built submarines, cruisers, destroyers and torpedo armed motorboats, and in 1925 the name was transformed in “Cantieri Navali Orlando Società Anonima”. With the advent of the Fascism the government launched a plan to develop and renew the fleet ordering to the shipyard the construction of the heavy cruiser Trento launched on October 4, 1927; the cruiser Veinticinco de Mayo was built in 1929 for the Argentine Navy.

=== OTO Cantiere di Livorno ===
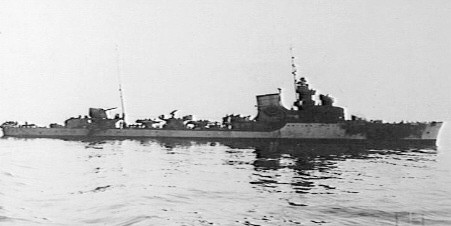
The Soldati-class destroyer Artigliere

Orlando shipyard was integrated in 1929 by the company “Odero Terni Orlando” abbreviated “OTO”, which reunited the Cantieri navali Odero, Cantiere navale del Muggiano and Vickers Terni with the management transferred to Genova; OTO was incorporated in the IRI in 1933. The shipyard received numerous orders from the Regia Marina for cruisers as Gorizia (1930), Pola (1931) and the destroyers of the Oriani-class and Soldati-class while in 1937 was built the destroyer Tashkent for the Soviet Navy. The shipyard during the World War II continued to build ships as Attilio Regolo, Scipione Africano, Legionario, Velite, Corsario, Antilope, Gazzella and Camoscio all finished, while others were never completed since 28 May 1943, the allied bombings over Livorno practically destroyed the shipyard, though some mechanical workshops had been transferred in another factory and by the Naval Academy. The Armistice took effect on September 8, 1943, and the German troops occupied the shipyard until July 1944, when the Allied troops arrived. In the post-war period the Genoa management thought that the Livorno plant had to be closed, but the workers and the population decided to restore the facility, which was the main industry in town. The new director, Marcello Orlando, grandson of Luigi, projected the reconstruction according to the system of prefabrication, and the IRI disposed in February 1949 the repairing of the Morosini slipway.

=== Ansaldo Stabilimento Luigi Orlando ===
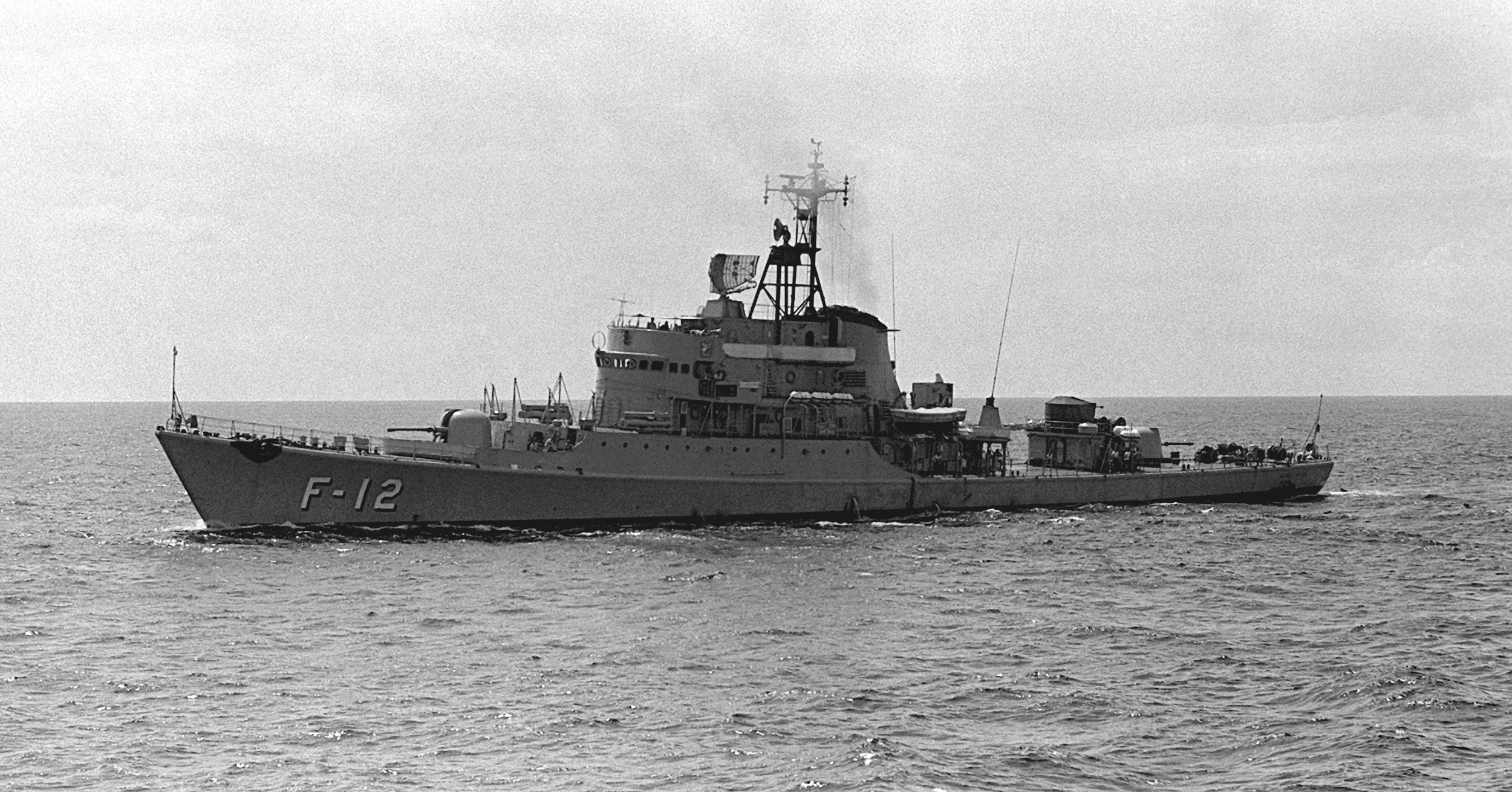
The Almirante Clemente-class destroyer General Jose Moran

The Livorno shipyard and the Cantiere navale del Muggiano were incorporated by Ansaldo in 1949 and was renamed to “Ansaldo S.p.A. Stabilimento Luigi Orlando”. The shipyard was equipped with new and powerful cranes able to move on rails along the docks and allowing the installation of large prefabricated elements. In that years about 2,000 workers were employed and were built ships like the tanker Mino d’Amico (1954), Adriana Fassio (1957), Antonietta Fassio (1960), the frigate Centauro (1954), the destroyers Indomito (1955) and Intrepido (1962) for the Italian Navy and the Almirante Clemente-class destroyer: Almirante Clemente (1954), General Jose J. Flores (1954), General Jose Moran (1955) and Almirante Brion (1955), General Juan de Austria (1956) and Almirante Garcia (1956) for the Venezuelan Navy.

=== Cantiere navale Luigi Orlando ===
In 1964 Ansaldo decided to dispose of the shipyard and it was acquired by “Cantiere navale Luigi Orlando S.p.A.” which returned to its own autonomy. The shipyard built frigates and corvettes for the Indonesian Navy, fishing boats for the South Korea, ferries for Italy, tankers, gas carriers, bulk carriers. In 1967 was projected to build a new large dry dock capable of repairing ships up to 300,000 tons, it is the major in the Mediterranean region. The shipyard slowed the production utilizing the Umbria slipway launching 13 Espresso-class ferries for Traghetti del Mediterraneo, ro-ro cargo, gas carriers and tankers.

=== Fincantieri Cantiere di Livorno ===
The shipyard was merged into Fincantieri on 1 January 1984 with the denomination “Fincantieri Cantieri Navali Italiani S.p.A. Stabilimento di Livorno”. The shipyard built fourteen ships as ro-ro containers, tankers and ferries. In order to be economical Fincantieri understood that was not possible to compete in the international market with an unfit plant to manufacture fast ferries, in 1995 decided to close the Livorno shipyard.

=== Cantiere navale fratelli Orlando ===
The "Cantiere navale fratelli Orlando s.c.r.l." was created on January 1, 1996 by a consortium of five cooperatives to start a society composed by the 360 employees of the shipyard. The new cooperative continued to produce and repair ships, were built: Monte Bello (1997), Giovanni Fagioli (1998), Mimmo Ievoli (1998), Ievoli Shine (1998), Isola Amaranto (1999), Montallegro (1999), Enrico Ievoli (1999), Isola Atlantica (2000), Mega Express (2001), Mega Express Two (2001), Gennaro Ievoli (2003) and the last one Pertinacia (2003). Despite the sacrifices of the workers other factors influenced the survival of the shipyard as the market crisis, the Asian competitors, the absence of an entrepreneurial tradition of the management and the building of the two Mega Express for Corsica Ferries - Sardinia Ferries which caused heavy financial losses leading to the closure of the shipyard in 2002. The historical shipyard was acquired by Azimut-Benetti, builders of luxury yachts in 2003.

== Ships built ==
- Adamastor
- Alce
- Vittorio Alfieri
- Almirante Briòn
- Almirante Clemente
- Almirante Garcia
- Animoso
- Antilope
- Ardente
- Ardito
- Artigliere
- Ascari
- Audace
- Georgios Averof
- Aviere
- Caio Mario
- Calatafimi
- Camicia Nera
- Camoscio
- Alfredo Cappellini
- Caprera
- Capriolo
- Giosuè Carducci
- Carrista
- Castelfidardo
- Centauro
- Cervo
- Confienza
- Conte Verde
- Corazziere
- Corsaro
- Curtatone
- Daino
- Emanuele Filiberto Duca d'Aosta
- Etruria
- Ettore Fieramosca
- Gazzella
- General Austria
- General Belgrano
- General Flores
- General Moran
- Geniere
- Vincenzo Gioberti
- Gorizia
- Indomito
- Intrepido
- Legionario
- Lepanto
- Monzabano
- Alfredo Oriani
- Palestro
- Pisa
- Pola
- Attilio Regolo
- Renna
- San Martín
- San Martino
- Scipione Africano
- Solferino
- Squadrista
- Stambecco
- Tashkent
- Claudio Tiberio
- Salvatore Todaro
- Trento
- Umbria
- Varese
- Veinticinco de Mayo
- Velite
- Vesuvio

== Bibliography ==
- Brescia, Maurizio (2012). Mussolini's Navy: A Reference Guide to the Regina Marina 1930–45. Annapolis, Maryland: Naval Institute Press. ISBN 978-1-59114-544-8.
