= Oriani-class destroyer =

Class of destroyers

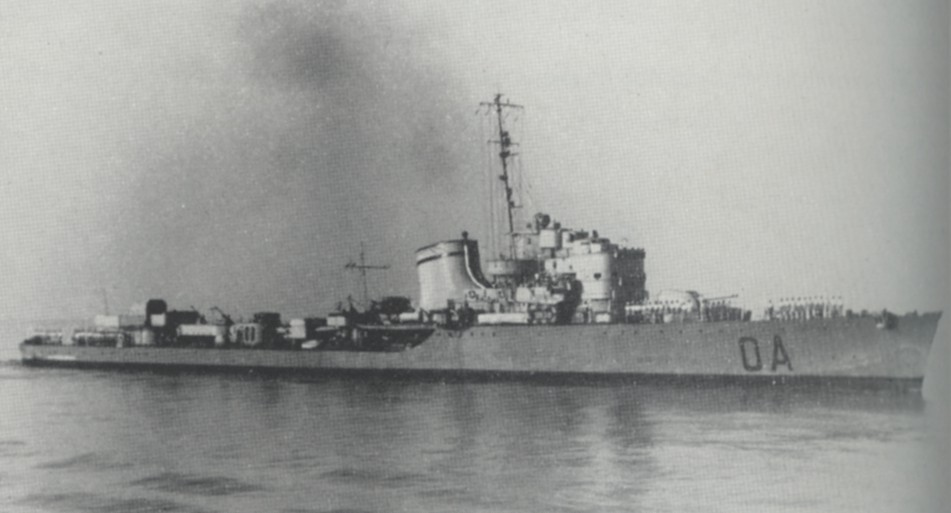
- Oriani

Class overview
- Name: Oriani class
- Operators: Regia Marina; French Navy
- Preceded by: Maestrale class
- Succeeded by: Soldati class
- Built: 1935–1936
- In commission: 1937–1954
- Completed: 4
- Lost: 3
- Scrapped: 1

General characteristics (as built)
- Type: Destroyer
- Displacement: 1,700–1,750 long tons (1,730–1,780 t) (standard); 2,400–2,450 long tons (2,440–2,490 t) (full load)
- Length: 106.7 m (350 ft 1 in)
- Beam: 10.15 m (33 ft 4 in)
- Draught: 3.42–4.8 m (11 ft 3 in – 15 ft 9 in)
- Installed power: 3 Thornycroft boilers; 48,000 hp (36,000 kW)
- Propulsion: 2 shafts; 2 geared steam turbines
- Speed: 33 knots (61 km/h; 38 mph)
- Range: 2,600–2,800 nmi (4,800–5,200 km; 3,000–3,200 mi) at 18 knots (33 km/h; 21 mph)
- Complement: 207
- Armament: 2 × twin 120 mm (4.7 in) guns; 2 × single 120 mm (4.7 in) star shell guns; 4 × twin 13.2 mm (0.52 in) machine guns; 2 × triple 533 mm (21 in) torpedo tubes; 56 mines

The Oriani class (also known as the Poeti class), were a group of four destroyers built for the Regia Marina (Royal Italian Navy) in the mid-1930s. They were improved versions of the Maestrale-class destroyers and had increased machinery power and a different anti-aircraft armament. The increase in power, however, disappointed in that there was only a marginal speed improvement. The obsolete 40 mm/39 pom-pom anti-aircraft guns were finally discontinued, being replaced by extra 13.2 mm (0.52 in) machine guns; otherwise armament was unchanged.

== Modifications ==
Significant upgrades were made to the weapons systems of the two ships that survived Matapan, similar to those made to the Maestrales. One torpedo tube mounting was replaced by two 37 mm (1.5 in)/54 guns; 20 mm (0.79 in) cannon, a 120 mm star-shell gun and depth charge throwers were also installed. Before the end of the war, one ship, Oriani had a German Seetakt radar and an additional 20 mm cannon.

== Ships ==
All four ships were built by O.T.O. Livorno and named after poets:

| Ship | namesake | Launched | Completed | Notes |
|---|---|---|---|---|
| Alfredo Oriani | Alfredo Oriani | 30 July 1936 | 15 July 1937 | Damaged in the Battle of Cape Matapan, she took part in the successful attack on Harpoon convoy in June 1942. The ship escaped from La Spezia during the Italian Armistice in 1943 and was interned in Malta. She was given to the French Navy as a war reparation, where she served as the D'Estaing until 1954 |
| Vittorio Alfieri | Vittorio Alfieri | 20 December 1936 | 1 December 1937 | Sunk on 28 March 1941 in the Battle of Cape Matapan |
| Giosuè Carducci | Giosuè Carducci | 28 October 1936 | 1 November 1937 | Sunk 28 March 1941 in the Battle of Cape Matapan |
| Vincenzo Gioberti | Vincenzo Gioberti | 19 September 1936 | 27 October 1937 | Sunk on 9 August 1943 by the British submarine HMS Simoom |

== Bibliography ==
- Brescia, Maurizio (2012). Mussolini's Navy: A Reference Guide to the Regina Marina 1930–45. Annapolis, Maryland: Naval Institute Press. ISBN 978-1-59114-544-8.
- Campbell, John (1985). Naval Weapons of World War Two. Annapolis, Maryland: Naval Institute Press. ISBN 0-87021-459-4.
- Fraccaroli, Aldo (1968). Italian Warships of World War II. Shepperton, UK: Ian Allan. ISBN 0-7110-0002-6.
- Roberts, John (1980). "Italy". In Chesneau, Roger (ed.). Conway's All the World's Fighting Ships 1922–1946. New York: Mayflower Books. pp. 280–317. ISBN 0-8317-0303-2.
- Rohwer, Jürgen (2005). Chronology of the War at Sea 1939–1945: The Naval History of World War Two (Third Revised ed.). Annapolis, Maryland: Naval Institute Press. ISBN 1-59114-119-2.
- Smigielski, Adam (1995). "Italy". In Chumbley, Stephen (ed.). Conway's All the World's Fighting Ships 1947-1995. Annapolis, Maryland: Naval Institute Press. pp. 195–218. ISBN 1-55750-132-7.
- Whitley, M. J. (1988). Destroyers of World War 2: An International Encyclopedia. Annapolis, Maryland: Naval Institute Press. ISBN 1-85409-521-8.
