= List of 120 mm Italian naval guns =

Italian 120 millimetre naval guns were standard main armament on Italian destroyers and were widely used on various other ships and coastal artillery. The 50-calibre guns used a charge of 9.7 kilograms (21 lb) of smokeless powder to push a 23.49-kilogram (51.8 lb) projectile to a velocity of 950 metres per second (3,100 ft/s). Velocity was later reduced to 920 metres per second (3,000 ft/s), which gave a maximum range of 19.6 kilometres (12.2 mi) at 45° elevation or 18.2 kilometres (11.3 mi) at 35° elevation. Variants of similar designs were built by Ansaldo, OTO, Vickers, Schneider, Canet and Armstrong. Older and shorter-barreled guns have different ballistics as noted below.

Closely mounting these twin 12-centimetre (4.7 in) guns in a common cradle tended to increase dispersion of fall of shot.

== 40-caliber Armstrong 1889 and 1891 ==
These were British QF Mark I and III guns used as coastal artillery and as star shell guns aboard Littorio-class battleships.

== 50-calibre M1909 ==
These guns formed the original secondary battery of Andrea Doria and Conte di Cavour-class battleships and were later used for coastal artillery. They fired a 22.75-kilogram (50.2 lb) projectile at 840 metres per second (2,800 ft/s).

== 45-caliber Armstrong 1918 ==
These guns were developed from the older 40-calibre models and installed as coastal artillery and aboard troopships and armed merchant cruisers. They fired a 51-pound (23 kg) projectile at 750 metres per second (2,500 ft/s). Range was 12.6 kilometres (7.8 mi) at the maximum elevation of 30°.

== 45-calibre Schneider-Canet-Armstrong 1918 ==
These guns with a maximum elevation of 30° were installed as coastal artillery and aboard auxiliary ships.

== 45-calibre Schneider-Canet-Armstrong 1918/19 ==
This gun was a twin mounting of the 1918 gun with maximum elevation increased to 32° . These guns were the main armament of Leone-class destroyers and the sloop Eritrea.

== 45-calibre Vickers Terni 1924 ==
These guns were the main armament of Sauro-class destroyers. A charge of 7.6 kilograms (17 lb) of smokeless powder pushed 51-pound (23 kg) projectiles at 850 metres per second (2,800 ft/s) to a range of 15.5 kilometres (9.6 mi) at the maximum elevation of 33°; but dispersion was increased by using a common cradle for the 16.6-ton twin mount.

== 27-calibre OTO 1924 ==
These were the original deck guns aboard Ettore Fieramosca and the Balilla-class submarines. When replaced by the 45-caliber OTO 1931, these guns were installed as an anti-aircraft battery at Messina where they fired 42.7-pound (19.4 kg) projectiles at a velocity of 730 metres per second (2,400 ft/s) to a ceiling of 7.8 kilometres (26,000 ft).

== 45-calibre OTO 1926 ==
These guns were the OTO version of the Vickers Terni 1924 guns. Turbine-class destroyers were built with these guns as the main armament, and Sella-class destroyers were re-armed with these guns.

== 50-calibre Ansaldo 1926 ==
These horizontal sliding breech block guns in 20-tonne common-cradle twin mountings with maximum elevation of 45° were the main armament of the Navigatori, Freccia, and Folgore-class destroyers.

== 45-calibre OTO 1931 ==
These 3.2-ton quick-firing guns with a horizontal sliding breech block were mounted aboard Ettore Fieramosca, Pietro Micca, Balilla, and Calvi-class submarines. They fired a 22-kilogram (49 lb) projectile at 730 metres per second (2,400 ft/s). Range was 14 kilometres (8.7 mi) at the maximum elevation of 32°.

== 50-calibre OTO 1931 ==
These horizontal sliding breech block guns in common-cradle twin mountings with maximum elevation of 33° were the main armament of Maestrale-class destroyers.

== 50-calibre OTO 1933 ==
These horizontal sliding breech block guns in 34-tonne common-cradle twin turrets with maximum elevation of 42° formed the secondary battery of the rebuilt Conte di Cavour-class battleships.

== 15-calibre OTO 1933 and 1934 ==
These were star shell howitzers installed aboard Zara-class cruisers and Maestrale, Oriani and Soldati-class destroyers. The guns elevated to 50° to fire a 19.8-kilogram (44 lb) shell at 400 metres per second (1,300 ft/s) to an effective range of 4 kilometres (2.5 mi).

== 50-calibre OTO 1936 ==
These horizontal sliding breech block guns in common-cradle twin mountings weighing 22.8 tonnes with maximum elevation of 35° were the main armament of Oriani-class destroyers.

== 50-calibre Ansaldo 1936 ==
These horizontal sliding breech block guns in common-cradle twin mountings weighing 21.6 tonnes with maximum elevation of 40° were the main armament of some Soldati-class destroyers.

== 50-caliber Ansaldo 1937 ==
These horizontal sliding breech block guns in common-cradle twin mountings weighing 21.6 tonnes with maximum elevation of 42° were the main armament of other Soldati-class destroyers.

== 50-caliber Ansaldo 1940 ==
These horizontal sliding breech block guns in 12-tonne single mounts with maximum elevation of 45° replaced the star shell howitzer of Soldati-class destroyers Bombardiere, Camicia Nera, Carabiniere, Corsaro, Geniere, Lanciere, Legionario, and Mitragliere.
