= HMS Stubborn =

Submarine of the Royal Navy

Coordinates: 35°58.962′N 14°26.773′E

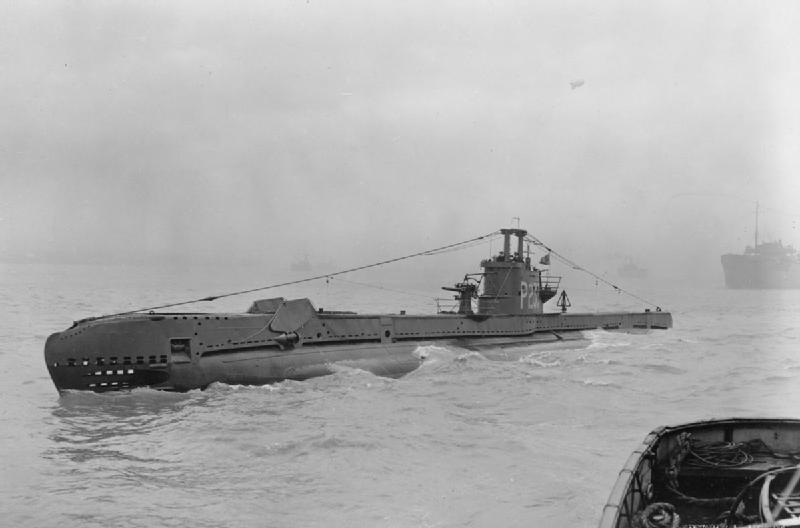
- HMS Stubborn

History

United Kingdom
- Name: HMS Stubborn
- Builder: Cammell Laird & Co Limited, Birkenhead
- Laid down: 10 September 1941
- Launched: 11 November 1942
- Commissioned: 20 February 1943
- Fate: Sunk as ASDIC target, 30 April 1946
- Badge

General characteristics
- Class & type: S class
- Displacement: 814-872 tons surfaced; 990 tons submerged
- Length: 217 ft (66 m)
- Beam: 23 ft 6 in (7.16 m)
- Draught: 11 ft (3.4 m)
- Speed: 14.75 knots surfaced; 8 knots submerged
- Complement: 48 officers and men
- Armament: 6 × forward 21 inch (533 mm) torpedo tubes, one aft; 13 torpedoes; one three-inch (76 mm) gun (QF 4-inch on later boats); one 20 mm cannon; three .303-calibre machine gun

HMS Stubborn was an S-class submarine of the Royal Navy, and part of the Third Group built of that class. She was built by Cammell Laird and launched on 11 November 1942. So far she has been the only ship of the Royal Navy to bear the name Stubborn.

== Career ==
Stubborn spent the war in home waters, operating off the Scandinavian coast, and in the Pacific Far East.

=== Home waters ===
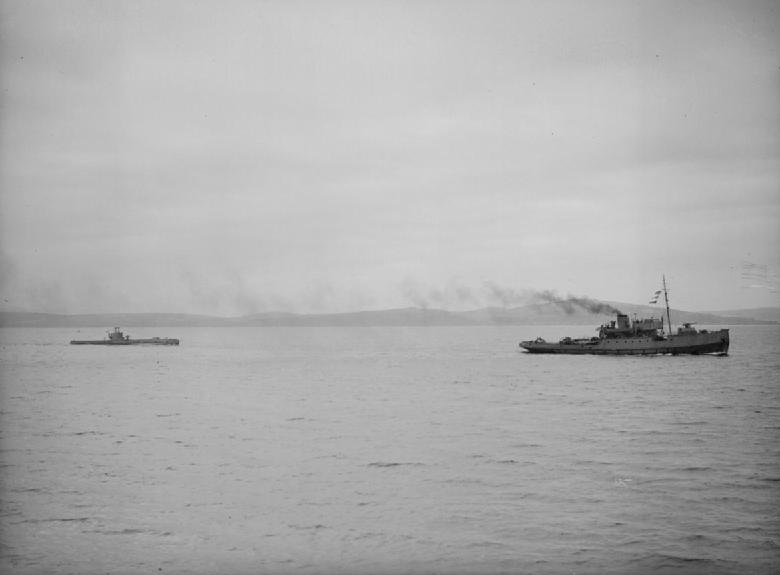
HMS Stubborn being towed by a tug off Greenock, after being damaged by depth charges

While on patrol in the Bay of Biscay, she fired torpedoes at a group of three German submarines (U-180, U-518, U-530) escorted by two destroyers. The torpedoes however missed their targets and the attack was not observed by the Germans. The two escorts were identified by Stubborn as Narvik-class destroyers. The German submarines were returning from patrol and were bound for Bordeaux.

Stubborn also made an unsuccessful attack on a German convoy off the Follafjord, west of Namsos, Norway, and on 11 February 1944, she sank the German merchant Makki Faulbaum and torpedoed and damaged the German merchant Felix D. some 25 miles north-west of Namsos, Norway. She later made an unsuccessful attack on a German convoy of five ships off the Folda Fjord, Norway. Stubborn fired six torpedoes but none found their target. Stubborn was heavily damaged by the German escort ships which jammed her aft hydroplanes "hard-adive", flooded an internal tank and damaged one of her propellers. As a result of this, Stubborn fell to 400 feet and her Captain, Lt. A. A. Duff, RN, was forced to blow main ballast to get her to the surface. She broke the surface only to dive hard again to a depth of 500 feet - 200 feet deeper than her designed maximum depth. Eventually the Germans broke off the attack and Duff struck for home, considerably hampered by the damage sustained and further hampered when the rudder disconnected itself. Stubborn was met by the destroyers HMS Swift and HMS Meteor and was eventually towed home to Lerwick, with her crew acting as human "balance weights" to maintain the submarine on an even keel. She was then sent to Devonport for major repairs, where Lt. Cdr Alastair Mars saw her and described her thus:

"I myself, then busy with the fitting-out of Thule, met Duff after arrival and examined Stubborn in the drydock. She gave the impression of a skeleton's chest; for her ribs protruded whilst between them, her steel plates had been pressed inwards to form concave curves, this bizarre effect providing unforgettable tribute to the workmanship of the men who built her."

=== Pacific Far East ===
Stubborn was transferred, arriving in mid 1945, but had a distinguished career there before the war ended. She sank the Japanese patrol vessel Patrol Boat No.2 (the former destroyer Nadakaze) in the Java Sea. The survivors were ordered to be shot in the water due to suspicious behaviour. Before this order was carried out, Stubborn was forced to dive by a circling aircraft and the survivors were left alive. She went on to sink a Japanese sailing vessel and an unidentified small Japanese vessel.

== Post war ==
Stubborn survived the Second World War and was sunk on 30 April 1946 as an ASDIC target off Malta. The wreck is located about 3 nautical miles (5.6 km) north-east of St Paul’s Bay and sits upright at a depth of 57 metres (187 ft).
