= Edward Archdale =

Edward Archdale may refer to:

- Sir Edward Archdale, 1st Baronet (1853–1943), Member of Parliament for Fermanagh North, 1898–1903 and 1916–1921
- Sir Edward Archdale, 3rd Baronet (1921–2009), Royal Navy officer
- Sir (Nicholas) Edward Archdale, 2nd Baronet (1881–1955), of the Archdale baronets
