= MV Nino Bixio =

Italian cargo ship

History
- Name: Nino Bixio
- Namesake: Nino Bixio (1821–73)
- Owner: SA Cooperativa di Navigazione
- Operator: Gruppo Garibaldi
- Port of registry: (Kingdom of Italy) Genoa (1941–42); (Italy) Genoa (1952–70)
- Builder: Gio. Ansaldo & C., Genoa
- Yard number: 323
- Launched: 19 October 1940
- Completed: December 1941
- Identification: Italian official number 2327 (1941–42); IMO number: 5252880 (1952–70)
- Fate: Scrapped August 1971

General characteristics
- Tonnage: 7,137 GRT; 10,100 DWT
- Length: 134 m (440 ft) p/p; 144 m (472 ft) o/a
- Beam: 18.6 m (61 ft)
- Propulsion: diesel engine, single screw
- Speed: 15 knots (28 km/h)

MV Nino Bixio was an Italian cargo ship. Giovanni Ansaldo and Company of Genoa built her in 1941 for the Garibaldi group, a Genoese shipping company. A Royal Navy submarine torpedoed and damaged her in 1942, killing 336 Allied prisoners of war who were aboard her. The ship survived, was repaired, and continued in merchant service until 1970. She was scrapped at La Spezia in 1971.

== Building ==
Giovanni Ansaldo and Company built the ship in 1941 for the Garibaldi group, which assigned her to its shipowning subsidiary SA Cooperativa di Navigazione. She was named after Nino Bixio a 19th-century Italian soldier and politician who served under Giuseppe Garibaldi.

Nino Bixio was completed in November 1941. She was a modern cargo ship, with a diesel engine driving her single screw and giving her a speed of 15 knots (28 km/h).

== Attack and rescue ==
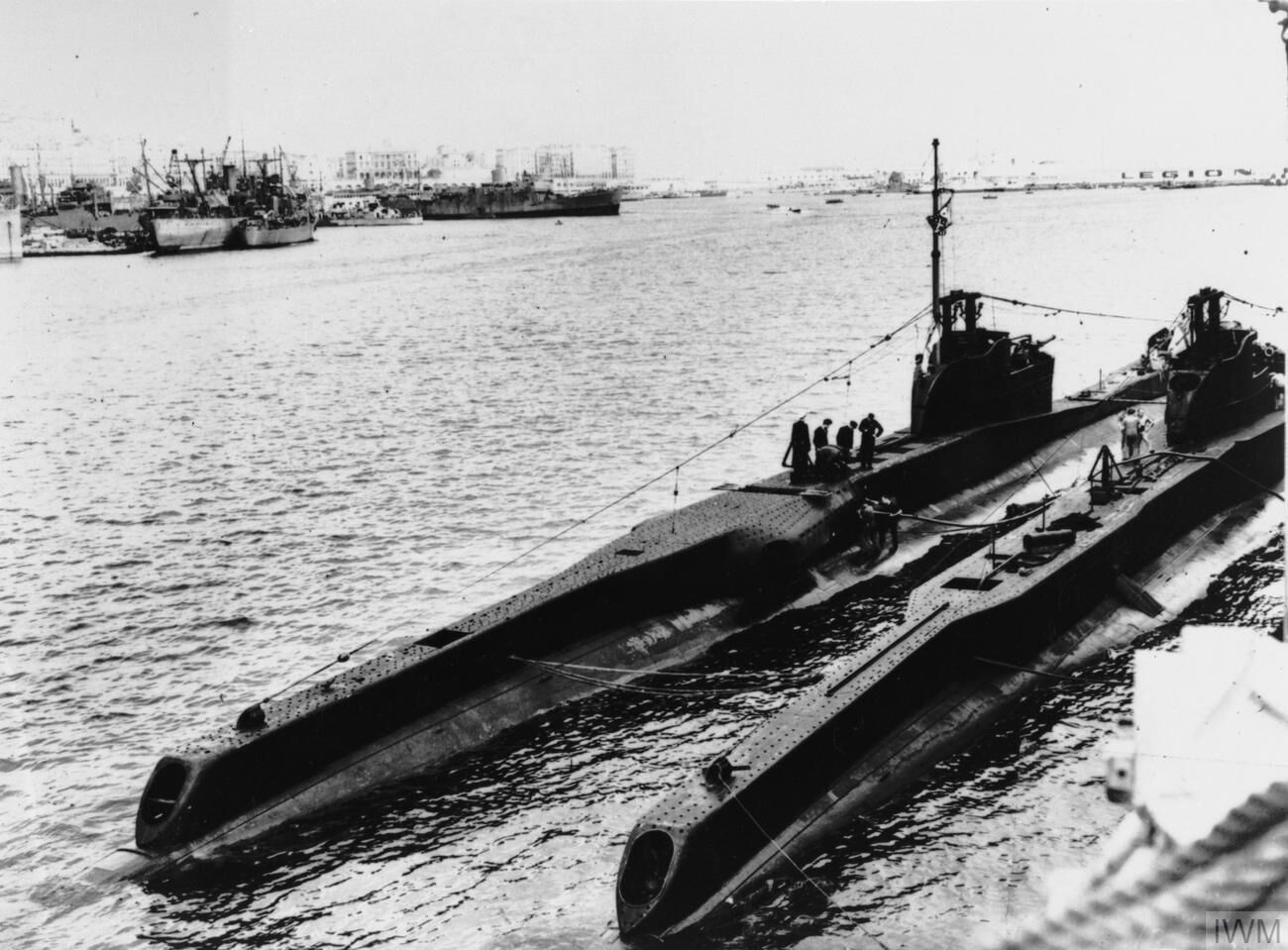
HMS Turbulent

On 16 August 1942 Nino Bixio and another Italian cargo ship, Sestriere, embarked several thousand UK, Dominion and Allied prisoners of war from the North African Campaign at Benghazi in Libya. The PoWs were divided alphabetically by surname: A–L aboard Sestriere and M–Z aboard Nino Bixio. Most of the prisoners were crowded into the ships' cargo holds. 3,200 of the PoWs were aboard Nino Bixio.

The two ships sailed for Brindisi in Italy, escorted by the destroyers Saetta and Nicoloso da Recco and the torpedo boats Castore and Orione.

Approximate position where Nino Bixio was torpedoed

The British T-class submarine HMS Turbulent sailed to intercept the convoy, whose escort was reinforced by several aircraft. At 16:33 on Monday 17 August Turbulent fired a spread of four torpedoes at the two cargo ships, and then dived deep to evade counter-attack. One torpedo suffered a gyroscope fault and went in circles, passing above the submerged submarine three times.

Sestriere escaped unharmed, but three torpedoes hit Nino Bixio. One exploded in her No 1 hold and another in her engine room. The third did not explode but grazed her rudder badly enough to disable her steering. Nino Bixio settled in the water but her bulkheads held and she remained afloat.

One source states that the Italian Navy escorts tried to depth charge Turbulent, whereas another claims that there was no counter-attack. Either way, the submarine escaped. Saetta took Nino Bixio in tow while Castore and Orione searched the sea for survivors. The cruiser Luigi Cadorna later arrived to help in the search, and a hospital ship came to receive the wounded.

Saetta towed Nino Bixio to the Peloponnesian port of Pylos in Italian-occupied Greece, where the damaged ship was beached. Later she was towed to Venice where she was sunk as a block ship to protect the port. Surviving passengers were transferred via Corinth to Bari in Italy. They were moved to prisoner of war Camp 57 at Grupignano/San Mauro, about 9 miles (15 km) east of Udine in north-eastern Italy.

== Casualties and monuments ==
The attack killed 336 Allied PoWs and wounded many others. Nino Bixio had shelter deck holds. In No. 1 hold, the two wooden ladders from the shelter deck to the lower level of the hold were destroyed in the explosion, hampering the rescue of survivors from the flooded part. The two ladders from the upper part of the hold to the deck survived, so prisoners from that level were able to escape. Many, including a lot of British Indian Army PoWs, jumped overboard. However, as it became clear that the ship would survive, many others stayed aboard.

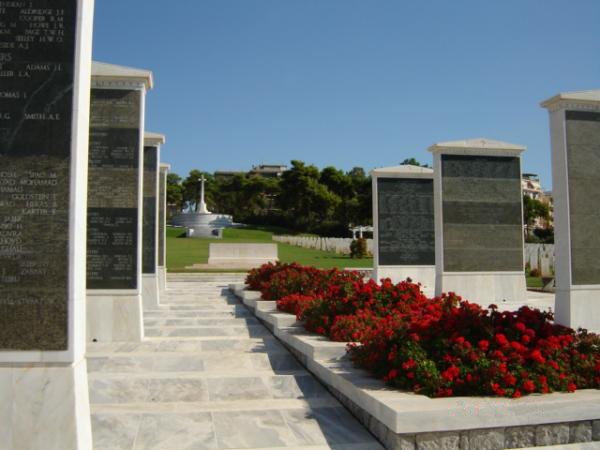
Part of the Athens Memorial in the CWGC's Phaleron War Cemetery

184 of the dead were from No. 1 hold: 116 New Zealanders, 41 Australians, 16 from the UK and 11 South Africans. Seven Free French PoWs in No. 2 hold were also killed. There were Indian Army PoWs in No. 3 hold, but the number of casualties among them is not known. A number of Italian guards who were on deck were also killed.

The bodies of some of the dead were brought ashore. 20 New Zealand soldiers are buried at Pylos and their names are included on the CWGC's Phaleron War Memorial in Athens. The majority of the dead have no grave but the sea, and are therefore commemorated on the Alamein Memorial in Western Egypt.

A chapel at PoW Camp 57 was built in 1943 and consecrated a few days before the Armistice of Cassibile. The camp was demolished after the war but the chapel was restored in the 1990s. A white marble tablet commemorating the 116 New Zealanders and 41 Australians among Ninio Bixio's dead was installed in the chapel in the 21st century.

== Peacetime career ==
In 1952 Nino Bixio was raised, re-fitted and returned to civilian service. In her peacetime career she visited a number of New Zealand ports including Wellington, where on 25 January 1955 a wreath-laying ceremony was held aboard her foredeck.

The ship was withdrawn from commercial service in 1970 and arrived at La Spezia on 28 November. Work to scrap her began in August 1971.

== See also ==
- Sebastiano Veniero, an Italian merchant ship that a Royal Navy submarine sank in December 1941, killing at least 300 UK and Dominion PoWs.
- Loreto, an Italian cargo ship that a Royal Navy submarine sank in October 1942, killing 130 Indian PoWs.
- Scillin, an Italian cargo ship that a Royal Navy submarine sank in November 1942, killing 830 Allied PoWs.
- SS Van Imhoff a Dutch ship carrying German internees to Ceylon, sunk by the Japanese.
- Hell Ships
