= Veniero =

Veniero may refer to:

- Italian ship Sebastiano Veniero, several ships named in honour of Sebastiano Venier
- MV Sebastiano Veniero (1940) (a.k.a. Jantzen, or SS Sebastian Venier), a 6,310 GRT cargo and passenger motor ship, built in Fiume
- Peter Veniero, also known as Verniero (born 1959), American lawyer and jurist
- Veniero Colasanti (1910–1996), Italian costume designer, set decorator and art director
- Veniero's, an Italian bakery that was established in 1894 in New York City

== See also ==
- Venier
