= HMS Sahib =

S-class submarine of the Royal Navy

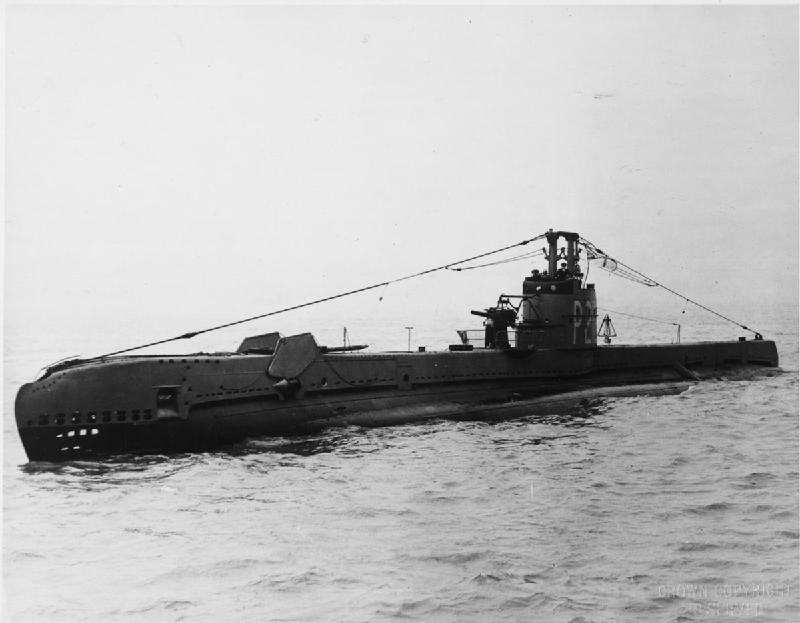
- Sahib on the surface

History

United Kingdom
- Name: Sahib
- Ordered: 23 January 1940
- Builder: Cammell Laird, Birkenhead
- Laid down: 5 July 1940
- Launched: 19 January 1942
- Commissioned: 13 May 1942
- Identification: Pennant number: P212
- Fate: Sunk, 24 April 1943
- Badge

General characteristics
- Class & type: S-class submarine
- Displacement: 842 long tons (856 t) (surfaced); 990 long tons (1,010 t) (submerged)
- Length: 217 ft (66.1 m)
- Beam: 23 ft 9 in (7.2 m)
- Draught: 14 ft 8 in (4.5 m)
- Installed power: 1,900 bhp (1,400 kW) (diesel); 1,300 hp (970 kW) (electric)
- Propulsion: 2 × diesel engines; 2 × electric motors
- Speed: 15 kn (28 km/h; 17 mph) (surfaced); 10 kn (19 km/h; 12 mph) (submerged)
- Range: 6,000 nmi (11,000 km; 6,900 mi) at 10 knots (19 km/h; 12 mph) (surfaced); 120 nmi (220 km; 140 mi) at 3 knots (5.6 km/h; 3.5 mph) (submerged)
- Test depth: 300 ft (91.4 m)
- Complement: 48
- Sensors & processing systems: Type 129AR or 138 ASDIC; Type 291 early-warning radar
- Armament: 7 × 21 in (533 mm) torpedo tubes (6 × bow, 1 × stern); 1 × 3 in (76 mm) deck gun

HMS Sahib was a third-batch S-class submarine built for the Royal Navy during the Second World War. She was launched on 19 January 1942 and commissioned on 13 May 1942. She was the only British naval vessel to bear the name Sahib.

After an initial patrol in the Arctic Ocean off Norway, Sahib sailed to Gibraltar, then patrolled the Alboran Sea, sinking one ship and damaging another. Sahib then transited to Malta, from which she conducted three war patrols. On the second one, Sahib sank the Italian transport SS Scillin, which was transporting Allied prisoners of war; Scillin sank with the loss of 787 men. On her next patrol, Sahib sank a large Italian merchant ship, then damaged a coastal trading vessel. The submarine was then assigned to join another submarine flotilla and operated from Algiers in French North Africa. In her next patrols, Sahib sank the German submarine U-301, two Italian merchant ships, and two small sailing vessels.

On 24 April 1943, Sahib sank a heavily protected Italian merchant; however, she was then attacked with depth charges and forced to surface. The crew of Sahib were evacuated and rescued with only one casualty by the Italian ships while the submarine was scuttled and sank.

== Design and description ==
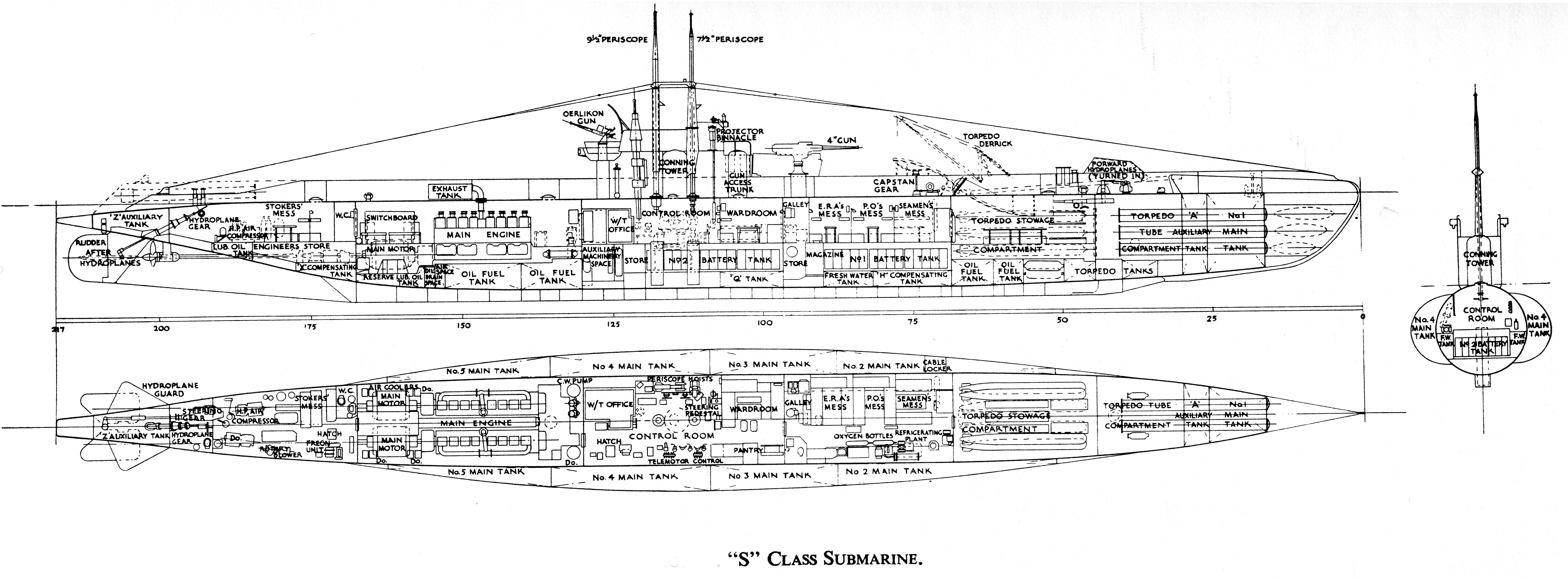
Schematic drawing of a S-class submarine

The S-class submarines were designed to patrol the restricted waters of the North Sea and the Mediterranean Sea. The third batch was slightly enlarged and improved over the preceding second batch of the S class. The submarines had a length of 217 feet (66.1 m) overall, a beam of 23 feet 9 inches (7.2 m) and a draught of 14 feet 8 inches (4.5 m). They displaced 842 long tons (856 t) on the surface and 990 long tons (1,010 t) submerged. The S-class submarines had a crew of 48 officers and ratings. They had a diving depth of 300 feet (91.4 m).

For surface running, the boats were powered by two 950-brake-horsepower (708 kW) diesel engines, each driving one propeller shaft. When submerged each propeller was driven by a 650-horsepower (485 kW) electric motor. They could reach 15 knots (28 km/h; 17 mph) on the surface and 10 knots (19 km/h; 12 mph) underwater. On the surface, the third-batch boats had a range of 6,000 nautical miles (11,000 km; 6,900 mi) at 10 knots (19 km/h; 12 mph) and 120 nmi (220 km; 140 mi) at 3 knots (5.6 km/h; 3.5 mph) submerged.

The third-batch submarines were armed with seven 21-inch (533 mm) torpedo tubes. A half-dozen of these were in the bow and there was one external tube in the stern. They carried six reload torpedoes for the bow tubes for a total of thirteen torpedoes. Twelve mines could be carried in lieu of the internally stowed torpedoes. They were also armed with a 3-inch (76 mm) deck gun. The third-batch S-class boats were fitted with either a Type 129AR or 138 ASDIC system and a Type 291 or 291W early-warning radar.

== Construction and career ==
HMS Sahib was a third-group S-class submarine and was ordered by the Admiralty on 23 January 1940. She was laid down in the Cammell Laird Shipyard in Birkenhead on 5 July 1940 and was launched on 19 January 1942. On 10 May 1942, Sahib, under the command of Lieutenant J. H. Bromage, sailed from the shipbuilding yards to Holy Loch, where she was commissioned into the Royal Navy three days later. Sahib was a term used in colonial British India to address Europeans with official or social statuses.

Between 11 May and 24 June 1942, Sahib underwent a period of training, then departed for her first war patrol. She was ordered to operate off Northern Norway and protect the Arctic Convoys PQ 17 and QP 13 to and from northern Russian ports. On 11 July, Sahib fired six torpedoes at the German submarine U-658 but missed, then ended her patrol in Lerwick the next day.

On 3 August, Sahib, along with HMS Talisman set sail for Gibraltar. After six days at sea, she sighted the German submarine U-84 and launched five torpedoes at it; they missed, however, and Sahib surfaced and engaged the submarine with the 3-inch deck gun from a range of 5,000 yards (4,600 m). U-84's captain decided not to engage in a gunnery duel with the British submarine and dived before Sahib could fire more than three shells. Sahib arrived in Gibraltar on 14 August.

=== Gibraltar ===
After conducting exercises off Gibraltar with HMS Lightning, Sahib conducted a short patrol in the Alboran Sea from 27 August to 1 September 1942. Sahib departed port on 6 September to conduct her third war patrol, off the west coast of Sardinia. On 12 September, she sighted the Italian vessel Ida S and attacked it with her deck gun after surfacing. The vessel's crew then abandoned their ship, leaving its sails set and engines running; Sahib boarded the ship and sank it with demolition charges. Two days afterwards, Sahib fired a torpedo into the Italian harbour of Buggerru, Sardinia. The torpedo hit the port's mole, killing two and injuring several others. On 16 September, Sahib attacked an Italian fishing vessel with its deck gun and claimed to have sunk it; according to Italian sources it was heavily damaged but returned to port with two dead. Sahib returned to Gibraltar on 21 September.

=== Malta ===
Between 2 and 9 October, Sahib transited to Malta, where she joined the 10th Submarine Flotilla. On 16 October, she commenced another war patrol, this time west of Greece. Sahib was attacked by enemy aircraft en route to her patrol area but was not damaged. On 22 October, Sahib launched four torpedoes at the heavy cargo/passenger ship Calino but missed, and was subsequently attacked with depth charges by the Italian destroyer Antonio Mosto but escaped unscathed. Sahib ended her patrol in Malta on 26 October.

On 3 November 1942, Sahib along with her sister ships Safari and Saracen, departed Malta for a patrol off North Africa to protect the Allied landings in North Africa. On her way to the patrol area, Sahib was fruitlessly attacked by German Messerschmitt Bf 109 fighter-bomber aircraft. On the evening of 14 November 1942, Sahib sighted the Italian transport SS Scillin off Libya, which was transporting Allied prisoners of war (POWs). Sahib first fired two shells at the cargo ship and then launched a single torpedo, which hit Scillin's hold and rapidly sank her. Prisoners in the hold had little chance of survival. Sahib rescued 27 POWs (26 British and one South African), Scillin's captain and 34 Italian crew and soldiers. Sahib was then forced to depart after she detected Sonar echo pings and sighted an unidentified ship approaching. Out of approximately 944 men aboard Scillin, 787 were not rescued and drowned. Another source states that 806 POWs were killed, as well as 79 Italians. A memorial plaque at the National Memorial Arboretum has been dedicated to the 2000+ British POWs who died at sea during World War II, of which 787 were killed aboard Scillin. Sahib landed the survivors in Malta the next day, then patrolled the Gulf of Sirte until 25 November.

Sahib departed Malta on 7 December to patrol off Naples, Italy; her orders were changed five days later to patrol the Gulf of Tunis instead. On 14 December, northwest of Cape Bon, Tunisia, Sahib sighted the Italian merchant ships Honestas and Castelverde escorted by two Italian torpedo boats and several aircraft. Honestas was carrying 1,000 tons of ammunition and 50 vehicles; Sahib fired five torpedoes at it. One struck, and Honestas sank. After evading the merchants' escorts, Sahib returned to periscope depth and spotted the other merchant, but it was blown up by another Royal Navy submarine, Unruffled, before Sahib could attack it. On 20 December, she attacked and damaged the Italian coastal trading vessel Ist no.23 with gunfire and torpedoes; the torpedoes however ran under the ship and did not explode. Ist no.23 was later taken in tow back to harbour. On 25 December, Sahib ended her patrol in Algiers, joining the 8th Submarine Flotilla.

=== Algiers ===
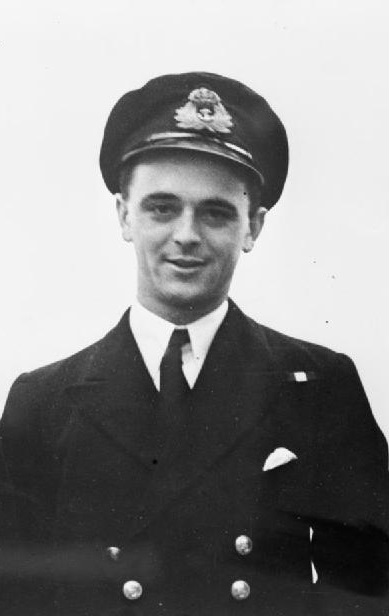
Lieutenant Ian Edward Fraser, who was awarded the Distinguished Service Cross for his action during the sinking of U-301

On 10 January 1943, Sahib departed Algiers to conduct another patrol, her seventh since her commissioning; she was to patrol the Gulf of Genoa. After patrolling for four days, Sahib torpedoed and sank the German merchant ship Oued Tiflet southwest of Savona, Italy. In the early morning of 20 January, Sahib bombarded an Italian seaplane hangar with her deck gun at Finale Ligure, Italy, but was forced to dive when coastal batteries opened fire upon Sahib. The next day, Sahib torpedoed and sank the German submarine U-301 west of Bonifacio, Corsica, in position 41°27′N 07°04′E. According to Sahib's log the U-boat was first spotted proceeding on the surface early that morning at a distance of 4.5 miles (7.2 km). Sahib closed to 2.6 miles (4.2 km) and into a more favourable position before firing a full salvo of six torpedoes at five second intervals. Three minutes later three explosions were heard, a large cloud of smoke was seen and it was noted that radio transmissions stopped. Sahib closed and recovered the only survivor from the 46 crew, 19-year-old Fähnrich zur See Wilhelm Rahn. Lieutenant Ian Edward Fraser was subsequently awarded the Distinguished Service Cross for his actions aboard Sahib during the sinking of U-301. Sahib continued patrolling until 25 January, when she returned to Algiers.

Sahib's next patrol started on 5 February, with orders to operate off the Aeolian Islands, in the Tyrrhenian Sea. She attacked and damaged with gunfire the Italian vessels Francesco Padre and Santa Teresa no.233 off Capo d'Orlando, Sicily on 18 February, then on the 21st ended her patrol in Malta. She then returned to Algiers with supplies on 13 March.

On 18 March 1943, Sahib commenced another patrol, north of Sicily. Six days later, she torpedoed and sank the Italian merchant Tosca west of Cape Calava, Sicily. On 27 March, Sahib closed in on the coastal town of Milazzo, and fired tree torpedoes into its harbour. The old merchant ship Sidamo carrying a cargo of salt, was hit twice and sank; another ship was slightly damaged. Sahib next attacked five sailing vessels with her deck gun on 30 March; she sank Santa Maria Del Salvazione and San Vincenzo and damaged two others. Sahib then returned to Algiers on 4 April.

=== Last patrol and sinking ===
Sahib departed Algiers on 16 April, again to patrol north of Sicily; this was to be her last patrol. At midday on 23 April, Sahib sank the Italian tug Valente with gunfire south of Cape Vaticano. On 24 April 1943, Sahib sighted the Italian merchant ship Galiola 2 miles (3.2 km) off Capo di Milazzo, Sicily. Galiola was travelling from Reggio to Bizerta and was carrying 1,737 tons of cargo, mostly coal. Galiola was escorted by the torpedo boats Climene and Angelo Bassini, and the Gabbiano-class corvettes Gabbiano and Euterpe, as well as two aircraft. Sahib decided to attack, and launched four torpedoes at the merchant ship. One hit was made, and Galiola sank in less than five minutes. A patrolling aircraft then noticed Sahib nearly breaking the surface, and dropped a bomb at the submarine, but missed. Seconds later, Climene found Sahib on its sonar. Gabbiano narrowly evaded the torpedoes then attacked Sahib underwater with 21 depth charges. Sahib attempted to escape by diving deep at more than 270 feet (82.3 m) but additional depth charges from Euterpe breached the submarine's pressure hull and forced Sahib to surface after 11 minutes; Sahib was engaged by the destroyers' and torpedo boats' guns, as well as the aircraft's machine guns. As the Italian ships approached, Sahib's crew was evacuated and the submarine was scuttled to prevent her capture by Italian forces. Forty-seven men were picked up by the Italians; only one crew member died.

Many of Sahib's former crew escaped from prison camps in September 1943 and hid in the countryside hills until the liberation of Italy by the Allies.

== Summary of raiding history ==
During her service with the Royal Navy, Sahib sank ten Axis ships for a total of 12,383 GRT as well as a German u-boat.

Date	Name of ship	Tonnage	Nationality	Fate and location
12 September 1942	Ida S	24	Kingdom of Italy	Sunk with gunfire and demolition charges at 40°14′N 08°27′E
14 November 1942	SS Scillin	1,579	Kingdom of Italy	Torpedoed and sunk at 35°14′N 11°18′E
14 December 1942	Honestas	4,960	Kingdom of Italy	Torpedoed and sunk at 37°29′N 10°46′E
14 January 1943	Oued Tiflet	1,194	Nazi Germany	Torpedoed and sunk at 44°08′N 08°18′E
21 January 1943	U-301	-	Nazi Germany	Torpedoed and sunk at 41°27′N 07°04′E
24 March 1943	Tosca	474	Kingdom of Italy	Torpedoed and sunk at 38°11′N 14°54′E
27 March 1943	Sidamo	2,384	Kingdom of Italy	Torpedoed and sunk at 38°13′N 15°14′E
30 March 1943	Santa Maria Del Salvazione	25	Kingdom of Italy	Sunk with gunfire at 38°22′N 15°25′E
30 March 1943	San Vincenzo	29	Kingdom of Italy	Sunk with gunfire at 38°22′N 15°25′E
23 April 1943	Valente	286	Kingdom of Italy	Sunk with gunfire three miles south of Cape Vaticano, Italy
24 April 1943	Galiola	1,428	Kingdom of Italy	Torpedoed and sunk at 38°20.5′N 15°11.9′E
