= SS Loreto =

History

France, Italy
- Name: Astrée (1912–33); Loreto (1933–42)
- Owner: G Lamy & Cie, Caen (1912–33); Giovanni Longobardo (1933–34); Giuseppe Parisi (1935); Achille Lauro (1937–42)
- Operator: Société Navale Caennaise (1912–33); Lauro Lines (1933–42)
- Port of registry: (France) Caen; (Kingdom of Italy) Naples
- Builder: Sunderland Shipbuilding Co, Sunderland
- Yard number: 268
- Launched: 25 January 1912
- Completed: 1912
- Identification: Italian official number 390; code letters NWHE (1933); Call sign IPOK (from 1934)
- Fate: Sunk, 13 October 1942

General characteristics
- Tonnage: 1,069 GRT; tonnage under deck 864; 427 NRT
- Length: 223.0 ft (68.0 m)
- Beam: 33.0 ft (10.1 m)
- Depth: 13.8 ft (4.2 m)
- Installed power: 127 NHP
- Propulsion: 3-cylinder triple-expansion steam engine; single screw
- Speed: 11 knots (20 km/h)

SS Loreto, formerly Astrée, was a 1,069 GRT cargo steamship that was built in England in 1912 for French owners and bought in 1933 by Italian owners who renamed her Loreto. In 1942 a Royal Navy submarine sank her in the Tyrrhenian Sea, killing 130 British Indian Army prisoners of war who were aboard.

== Building and career ==
The Sunderland Shipbuilding Company of Sunderland, County Durham built the ship in 1912 as Astrée for G Lamy et Compagnie of Caen, France. She was managed for G Lamy by the Société Navale Caennaise. In 1933 Italian owners bought her, renamed her Loreto and appointed Lauro Lines to manage her. She passed through at least two individual owners until by 1937 Lauro Lines itself owned the ship.

The ship had a three-cylinder triple-expansion steam engine built by the North Eastern Marine Engineering Company of Newcastle. It developed 127 NHP, drove a single screw and gave the ship a speed of 11 knots (20 km/h).

== Loss ==
On 9 October the UK Government Code and Cypher School intercepted an enemy signal about Loreto and transmitted an Ultra warning:

"Loreto will sail from Tripoli at 9.00 a.m. of the 9th, speed 7 knots, and should arrive to Naples at 07.30 a.m. of the 13th. It will transport 350 POWs."

On 13 October 1942 Loreto was in the Tyrrhenian Sea about 8 nautical miles (15 km) west of Capo Gallo, near Palermo, Sicily. At 1732 hrs the British U-class submarine HMS Unruffled torpedoed and sank her, killing 130 British Indian Army POWs who were on the cargo ship. Unruffled may not have received the signal, or she may not have identified Loreto before firing.

== See also ==
- Sebastiano Veniero, an Italian merchant ship that a Royal Navy submarine sank in December 1941, killing at least 300 UK and Dominion PoWs.
- Nino Bixio, an Italian cargo ship that a Royal Navy submarine sank in August 1942, killing 336 UK, Dominion and Allied PoWs.
- Scillin, an Italian cargo ship that a Royal Navy submarine sank in November 1942, killing 830 Allied PoWs.
- SS Van Imhoff a Dutch ship carrying German internees to Ceylon, sunk by the Japanese.
- MS Rigel a Norwegian vessel used as a German prisoner of war (POW) transport during World War II which was sunk by British Fleet Air Arm aircraft off Norway on 27 November 1944 with more than 2,500 dead, mostly POWs.
- SS Thielbek, SS Deutschland and SS Cap Arcona, which were crowded with prisoners from the Neuengamme, Stutthof, and Mittelbau-Dora concentration camps, were sunk by the RAF.
- Hell Ships

== Sources ==
- Greene, Jack; Massignani, Alessandro (1994). Rommel's North Africa Campaign: September 1940–November 1942. Cambridge, MA: Perseus Books Group. p. 183. ISBN 1-58097-018-4.
