= George Nurse =

George Nurse may refer to:

- George Nurse (VC recipient) (1873–1945), Irish soldier
- George Nurse (footballer) (born 1999), British footballer
