= Sir Edward Archdale, 3rd Baronet =

British Royal Navy officer (1921–2009)

Captain Sir Edward Archdale Bt, DSC
- Captain Sir Edward Archdale, 3rd Baronet c.1960s
- Born: 8 September 1921; Portsmouth, Hampshire
- Died: 31 July 2009 (aged 87); Caterham, Surrey
- Military career
- Allegiance: United Kingdom
- Branch: Royal Navy
- Service years: 1935–1971
- Rank: Captain
- Conflicts: Second World War: Dunkirk evacuation; Operation Aerial
- Awards: Distinguished Service Cross; Mentioned in Despatches
- Other work: Politics

Captain Sir Edward Folmer Archdale, 3rd Baronet DSC (8 September 1921 – 31 July 2009) was a British baronet, Royal Navy officer, submariner during the Second World War and local politician in Northern Ireland.

== Early life ==
Edward Folmer Archdale was born on 8 September 1921 to Royal Navy officer and later Vice Admiral Sir Nicholas Archdale, 2nd Baronet, Aide-de-Camp to King George V of the United Kingdom. His mother was from Denmark.

Nicknamed "Teddy", he joined the Royal Navy after attending Copthorne Primary School in Sussex. He was in the Rodney class of 1935 at Dartmouth Naval College. After graduation, he was promoted to midshipman and served into the start of the war.

== War service ==
He served aboard HMS Vindictive and HMS Edinburgh. By May 1940, he was serving aboard HMS Sabre under Lieutenant Commander Brian Dean.

=== Operation Dynamo ===
HMS Sabre was conspicuous in the evacuation of British and French soldiers from the beaches of beaches at Malo-Les-Bains and the harbour mole during the Dunkirk evacuation. During nine days and nights of the evacuation, despite being damaged in an air attack, Sabre made ten round trips to Dunkirk. An example of her activity at this time:

In the early hours of 28 May, three ships boats from HMS Sabre picked up 100 men in two hours, from the beaches at Malo-Les-Bains to the east of the harbour mole. Then it was full speed to Dover with a turnaround of only 58 minutes, and the ship was back again at the Dunkirk harbour mole at 11.00am, where they loaded a further 800 men. Departing at 12.30pm, by now the ships weight had increased considerably, lowering her propeller draft. This meant because of the falling tide and a defective echo sounder, Lieutenant-Commander Dean had to slowly edge her passage through the shallows. She arrived back in Dover at 6.20pm. Refuelled, she was back to the Dunkirk mole at 10.30pm, the third trip of the day. This time, the ship stayed for only 35 minutes picking up another 500 troops.

Finally on Tuesday 4 June just after two in the afternoon the Admiralty announced the end of Operation Dynamo. All together an armada of over 860 ships including 39 destroyers had taken part in the evacuation of troops from the beaches and harbour. The Admiralty calculated the total British and Allied troops landed in England amounted to 338,226 troops rescued.

HMS Sabre had made more round trips than most and brought back to Dover a total of 5,765 soldiers – amongst the highest number for any individual ship. Lieutenant Commander Dean was awarded a Distinguished Service Order on 6 June. Archdale, Sabre's midshipman, was mentioned in despatches.

=== Operation Aerial ===
After Dunkirk there were still Allied forces to be evacuated from other French ports along the coast westward so the navy had further work to do. 'Operation Cycle' launched on 10 June rescued some 11,000 from the Channel port of Le Havre. Then on the 12th HMS Sabre was deployed to help with the evacuation of still more British and Allied forces in 'Operation Aerial' from the rest of France. It began with the evacuation of Cherbourg and continued for the next ten days, moving south to St Nazaire, Bordeaux, and right down to the Franco-Spanish border. Sabre was sent to Alderney the northerly island amongst the Channel Islands on 23 June and helped evacuate around 1,400 islanders to safety in Weymouth.

=== Rescuing children from SS Volendam ===
In September 1940 Archdale was with HMS Sabre, detailed to meet the first slow Atlantic convoy, as it approached the United Kingdom from Canada. A Finnish merchant ship, Elle 3,868 tons was torpedoed at 04.25hrs on the 28th and Sabre joined the hunt for the German U-boat (U-101) without success. Then two days later, during the evening of 30 August off Malin Head Sabre helped rescue the survivors of a torpedoed (by German submarine U-60) Dutch ship the 15,000 tons Holland America line, SS Volendam. She was in an outward bound convoy OB 205 for Canada, carrying 600 passengers, including 321 children under the Children's Overseas Reception Board scheme some as young as five, together with a crew of 250. They were taken to various west coast ports in Scotland. In January 1941 Dean was badly injured in heavy seas and Sabre put into Larne, Northern Ireland. Lieutenant Peter Gretton took command from 11 January 1941.

Archdale completed his training in HMS Hood and HMS Bulldog, later famous for her capture of the Enigma machine, before volunteering to serve in submarines. He served from 1942 to 1943 aboard HMS Unbroken under Alistair Mars, where he served as gunnery officer. He was awarded the Distinguished Service Cross in October 1943.

== Post-war service ==
After submarine service, he taught at the stone frigate HMS Excellent as a gunnery instructor. He was the gunnery officer of HMS Daring, served at the Royal Naval Tactical School from 1959 to 1962, He attended the Joint Service Defence College at Latimer, and the Canadian National Defence College at Kingston, Ontario. He retired from the Royal Navy and worked in defence sales after retirement.

== Political career ==
After he retired from the Ministry of Defence, Sir Edward became involved in local politics in Northern Ireland. He often wrote to newspapers about Naval policy. He was a Conservative Party member until joining the United Kingdom Independence Party later in life.

== Arms ==
Coat of arms of Sir Edward Archdale, 3rd Baronet

Notes
Granted 4 October 1928 by Sir Nevile Rodwell Wilkinson, Ulster King of Arms.
Crest
Out of a ducal crest coronet Or an heraldic tiger's head maned tufted and armed Sable.
Escutcheon
Quarterly 1st & 4th Azure a chevron Ermine between three talbots passant Or (Archdale) 2nd Or a chevron Sable (Mervyn) 3rd grandquarterly 1st & 4th Azure three fleurs-de-lis Or 2nd & 3rd Gules three gem-rings Gold all within a bordure Or charged with a tressure flory counterflory Gules in the centre point an inescutcheon Argent charged with a tilting spear and sword saltireways points upwards Proper (Montgomery).
Motto
Data Fata Secuta

Baronetage of the United Kingdom
Preceded by Edward Archdale	Baronet (of Riversdale, Fermanagh); 1955–2009	Succeeded by Nicholas Archdale
