= Italian ship Sebastiano Veniero =

Sebastiano Veniero or simply Veniero was the name of at least two ships of the Italian Navy named in honour of Sebastiano Venier and may refer to:

- Italian submarine Sebastiano Veniero, a Provana-class submarine launched in 1918 and sunk by collision in 1925
- Italian submarine Veniero, a Marcello-class submarine launched in 1938 and sunk in 1942
- MV Sebastiano Veniero (1940), a cargo and passenger motor ship launched 1940 and torpedoed and beached in 1941
