= HMS Turbulent (N98) =

Submarine of the Royal Navy

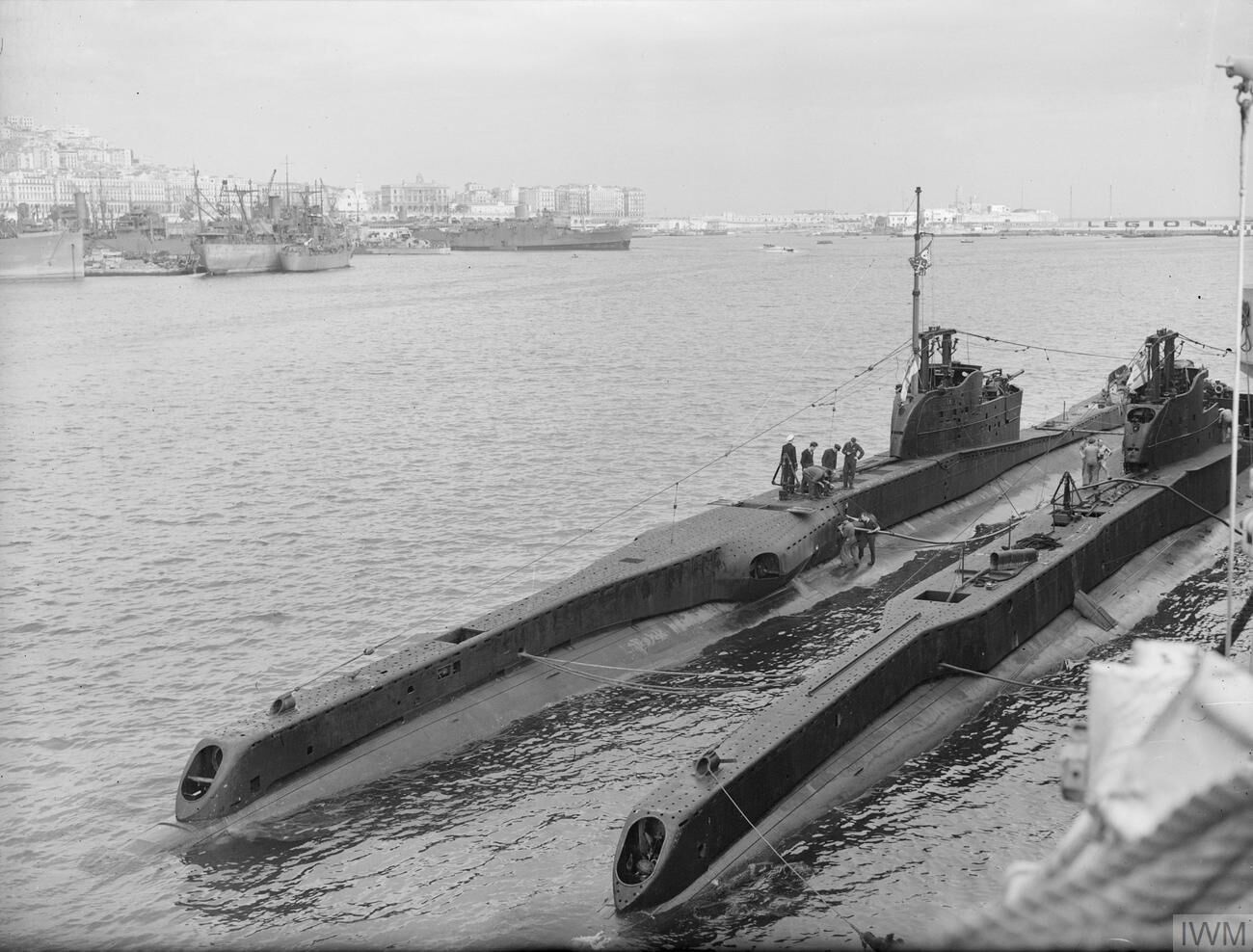
- HMS Turbulent on the outboard side, moored up

History

United Kingdom
- Name: HMS Turbulent
- Builder: Vickers-Armstrongs, Barrow
- Laid down: 15 March 1940
- Launched: 12 May 1941
- Commissioned: 2 December 1941
- Identification: Pennant number N98
- Fate: Sunk, March 1943
- Badge

General characteristics
- Class & type: British T class submarine
- Displacement: 1,090 tons surfaced; 1,575 tons submerged
- Length: 275 ft (84 m)
- Beam: 26 ft 6 in (8.08 m)
- Draught: 16.3 ft (5.0 m)
- Propulsion: Two shafts; Twin diesel engines 2,500 hp (1.86 MW) each; Twin electric motors 1,450 hp (1.08 MW) each
- Speed: 15.25 knots (28.7 km/h) surfaced; 9 knots (20 km/h) submerged
- Range: 4,500 nautical miles at 11 knots (8,330 km at 20 km/h) surfaced
- Test depth: 300 ft (91 m) max
- Complement: 61
- Armament: 6 internal forward-facing 21-inch (533 mm) torpedo tubes; 2 external forward-facing torpedo tubes; 3 external sternward-facing torpedo tubes; 6 reload torpedoes; 1 x 4-inch (102 mm) deck gun; 3 anti-aircraft machine guns

HMS Turbulent (N98) was a T-class submarine of the Royal Navy. It was laid down by Vickers-Armstrongs, Barrow and launched in May 1941.

== Career ==
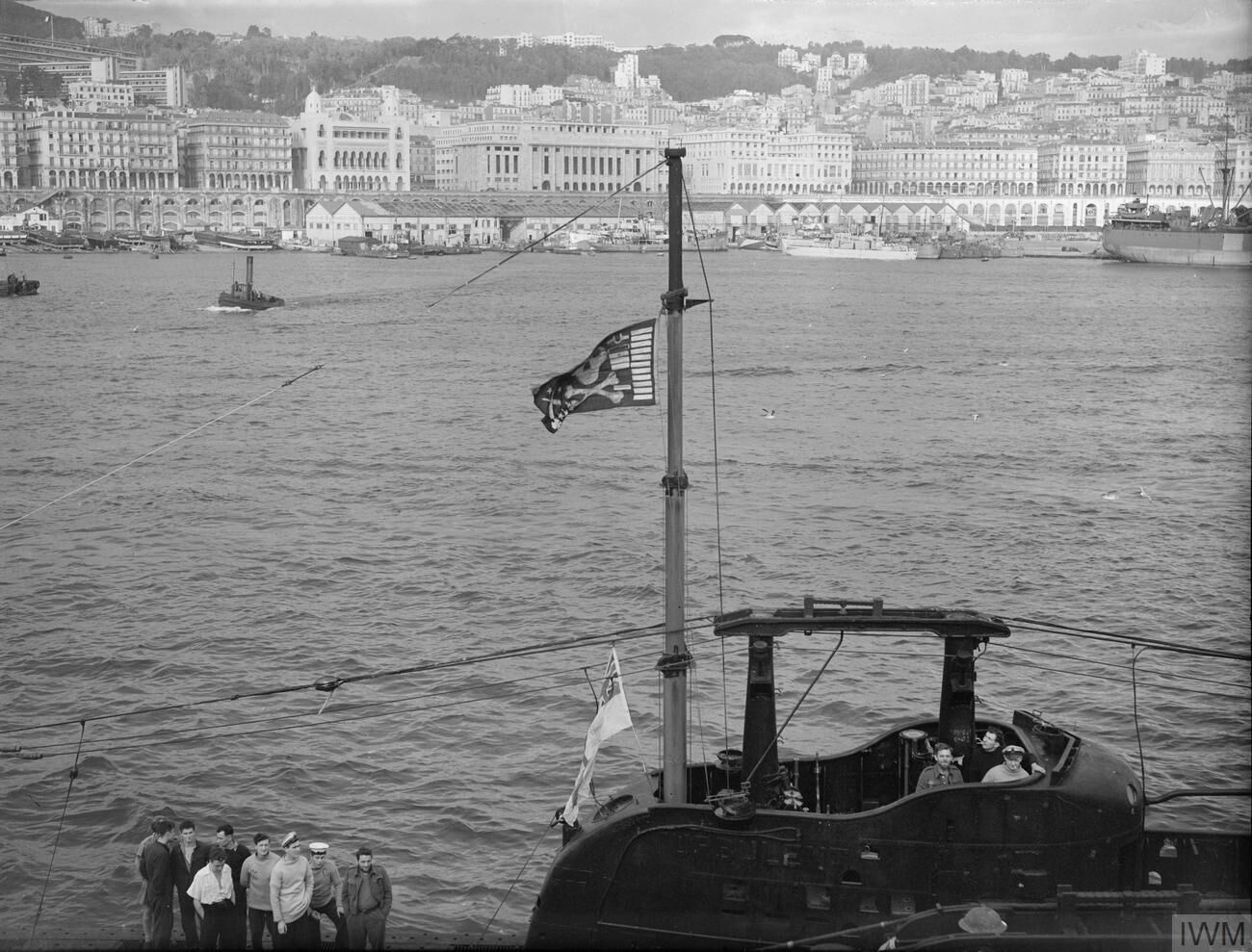
Turbulent flying a Jolly Roger flag, with symbols indicating successful engagements.

Turbulent spent most of her career serving in the Mediterranean. In that time she sank the following ships:

- Six Greek sailing vessels: the Prodromos, Aghios Apostolos, Aghios Yonizov, Evangelista, Aghios Dyonysios and Aghia Traio.
- Nine Italian merchants: Rosa M., Delia, Bolsena, Capo Arma, Regulus, Marte, Vittoria Beraldo, Pozzuoli and San Vincenzo
- The Italian sailing vessels Franco, San Giusto, Gesù Giuseppe e Maria and Pier Delle Vigne
- The Italian Navigatori-class destroyer Emanuele Pessagno
- The wreck of the Strale which had grounded near Cape Bon on 1 June 1942 and was finally destroyed by Turbulent
- The German ship Kreta
- The German auxiliary submarine tender Bengasi
- The Italian tanker Utilitas

Turbulent also damaged the Italian tanker Pozarica and the Italian cargo ship Nino Bixio. Nino Bixio was carrying more than 3,000 Allied prisoners of war, of whom 336 were killed by either the explosion or drowning.

She also launched unsuccessful attacks on the following ships:

- An unidentified submarine off Fiume
- The Italian merchantmen Anna Maria Gualdi and Sestriere
- The German submarine U-81, in two attacks
- The German transport Ankara
- The Italian armed merchant cruiser Ramb III which was damaged by Turbulent while in Benghazi harbour
- The small Italian passenger / cargo vessel Principessa Mafalda

== Sinking ==
On 23 February 1943 Turbulent sailed from Algiers for a patrol in the Tyrrhenian Sea. On 1 March is assumed that she torpedoed and sank the steamer San Vincenzo. On 3 March she shelled and sank the Italian motorsailers Gesù Giuseppe e Maria and Pier Delle Vigne. On 12 March the anti-submarine trawler Teti II sighted the periscope and conning tower of a submarine and attacked. Although the success of the attack is not sure, as a matter of fact Turbulent did not respond to any further messages and did not return when expected on 23 March. So, it was thought for a long time that either Turbulent fell victim of the Teti II attack or of a mine off Maddalena, Sardinia. This was actually refuted in a letter from Lt-cdr P K Kemp of the Royal Navy Historical Branch to Admiral Fioravanzo of the Italian Navy in February 1959 . The letter is held in the files of Ufficio Storico. M. M. More recent research, however, suggests that the action of 12 March 1943 was actually against the French submarine Casabianca (which survived) and that Turbulent may have been sunk on 6 March 1943 by depth charges dropped by the Italian torpedo boat Ardito off Punta Licosa, south of Naples.

== Aftermath ==
Turbulent sank a huge amount of enemy shipping and endured numerous attacks. The Royal history saying "Turbulent sank over 90,000 tons of enemy shipping. She was depth charged on over 250 occasions by enemy forces hunting her.

In recognition of this achievement, and the gallantry of Turbulent's crew, her commander, John Wallace Linton, DSO DSC RN was posthumously awarded the Victoria Cross in May 1943.

The King has been graciously pleased to approve of the grant of the Victoria Cross for great valour in command of HM Submarines to Commander John Wallace Linton, DSO, DSC, Royal Navy. From the outbreak of War until H.M.S. Turbulent's last patrol Commander Linton was constantly in command of submarines, and during that time inflicted great damage on the Enemy. He sank one Cruiser, one Destroyer, one U-boat, twenty-eight Supply Ships, some 100,000 tons in all, and destroyed three trains by gun-fire. In his last year he spent two hundred and fifty-four days at sea, submerged for nearly 'half the time, and his ship was hunted thirteen times and had two hundred and fifty depth charges aimed at her. His many and brilliant successes were due to his constant activity and skill, and the daring which never failed him when there was an Enemy to be attacked. On one occasion, for instance, in H.M.S. Turbulent, he sighted a convoy of two Merchantmen and two Destroyers in mist and moonlight. He worked round ahead of the convoy and dived to attack it as it passed through the moon's rays. On bringing his sights to bear he found himself right ahead of a Destroyer. Yet he held his course till the Destroyer was almost on top of him, and, when his sights came on the convoy, he fired. His great courage and determination were rewarded. He sank one Merchantman and one Destroyer outright, and set the other Merchantman on fire so that she blew up.

— London Gazette 25 May 1943
