= Capo Milazzo Lighthouse =

Lighthouse in Sicily, Italy

Capo Milazzo
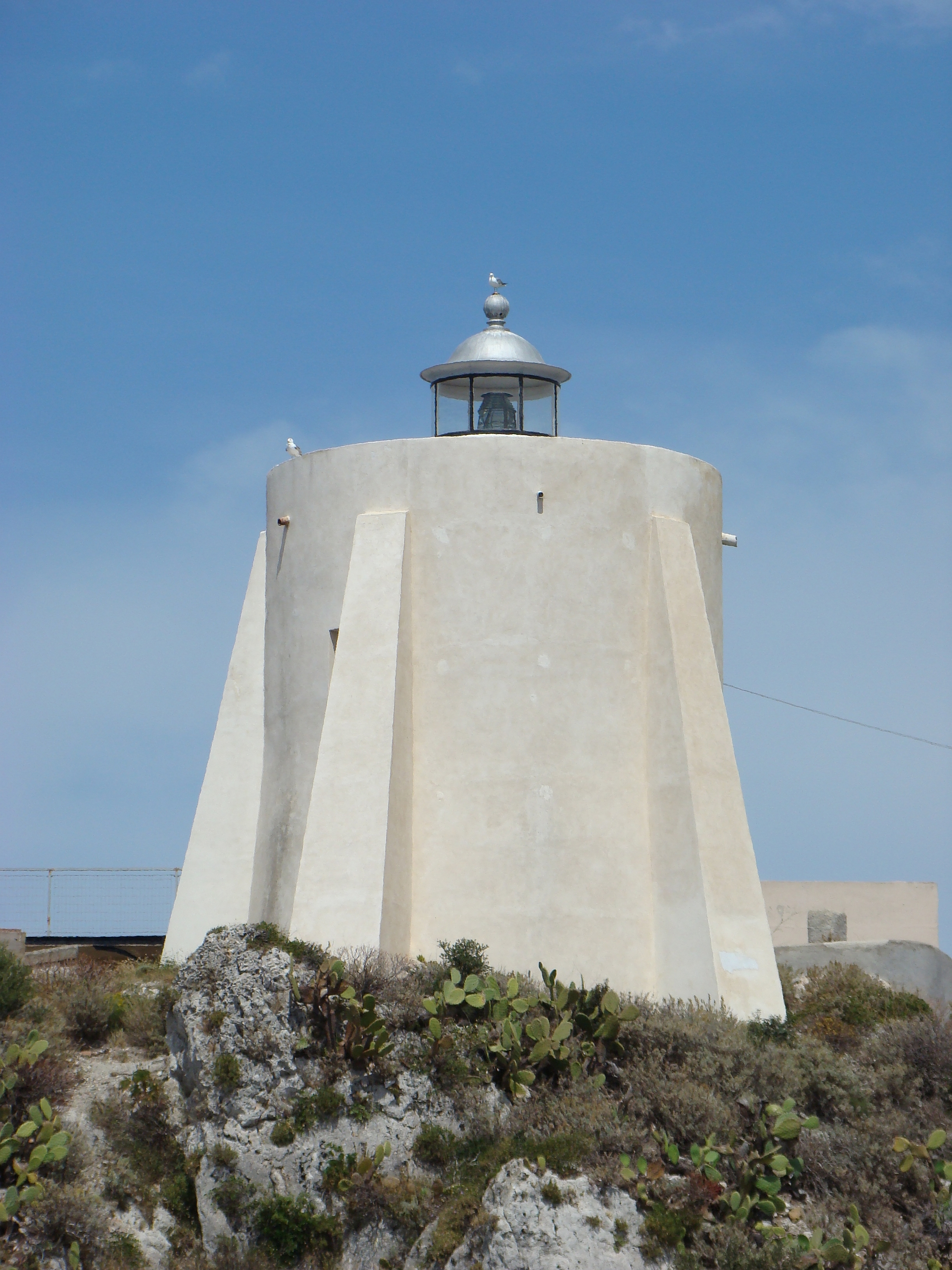
- Capo Milazzo Lighthouse
- Location: Capo di Milazzo; Milazzo; Sicily; Italy
- Coordinates: 38°16′14″N 15°13′52″E

Tower
- Constructed: 1853 (first)
- Foundation: concrete base
- Construction: concrete tower
- Height: 34 metres (112 ft)
- Shape: massive cylindrical tower with four buttresses and lantern
- Markings: white tower, grey metallic lantern dome
- Power source: mains electricity
- Operator: Marina Militare
- Heritage: Italian national heritage

Light
- First lit: 1891 (current)
- Focal height: 90 metres (300 ft)
- Lens: type OF
- Intensity: main: AL 1000 W reserve: LABI 100 W
- Range: main: 16 nautical miles (30 km; 18 mi) reserve: 12 nautical miles (22 km; 14 mi)
- Characteristic: L Fl W 6s.
- Italy no.: 3268 E.F.

Capo Milazzo Lighthouse (Italian: Faro di Capo Milazzo) is an active lighthouse located at the northern extremity of the peninsula of Capo di Milazzo which extends toward the Tyrrhenian Sea in the province of Milazzo.

== Description ==
The first lighthouse was built in 1853, than rebuilt in 1891 and recently restored in 2013. It consists of a massive white cylindrical tower with four buttresses, 34 metres (112 ft) high, with balcony and lantern The lantern, painted in grey metallic, is positioned at 90 metres (300 ft) above sea level and emits one long white flash in a 6 seconds period, visible at 16 nautical miles (30 km; 18 mi) of distance. The lighthouse is fully automated, powered by a solar unit and is operated by the Marina Militare and is identified by the code number 3268 E.F.

== See also ==
- List of lighthouses in Italy
- Capo di Milazzo
