= HMS Unbroken =

Submarine of the Royal Navy

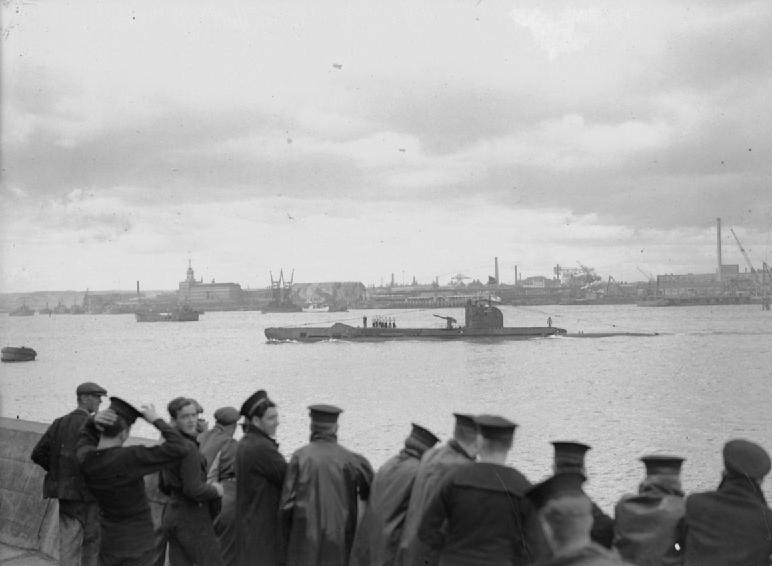
- Ratings on shore watch HMS Unbroken as she enters Portsmouth harbour after eighteen months duty in the Mediterranean

History

United Kingdom
- Name: HMS Unbroken
- Builder: Vickers-Armstrongs, Barrow-in-Furness
- Laid down: 30 December 1940
- Launched: 4 November 1941
- Christened: 1 February 1943
- Commissioned: 29 January 1942
- Out of service: transferred to Soviet Navy 26 June 1944
- Identification: P42
- Fate: Scrapped May 1950
- Badge

Soviet Union
- Name: V-2 (В-2)
- Acquired: 26 June 1944
- Fate: Returned to Royal Navy in 1949

General characteristics
- Class & type: U-class submarine
- Displacement: Surfaced - 540 tons standard, 630 tons full load; Submerged - 730 tons
- Length: 58.22 m (191 ft 0 in)
- Beam: 4.90 m (16 ft 1 in)
- Draught: 4.62 m (15 ft 2 in)
- Propulsion: 2 shaft diesel-electric; 2 Paxman Ricardo diesel generators + electric motors; 615 / 825 hp
- Speed: 11.25 knots (20.8 km/h) max surfaced; 10 knots (19 km/h) max submerged
- Complement: 27-31
- Armament: 4 bow internal 21 inch (533 mm) torpedo tubes - 8 - 10 torpedoes; 1 - 3-inch (76 mm) gun

HMS Unbroken (P42) was a Royal Navy U-class submarine built by Vickers-Armstrongs at Barrow-in-Furness; it was part of the third group of that class and has been the only vessel of the Royal Navy to bear the name. She entered service as P42 and was renamed Unbroken on 1 February 1943.

== Career ==
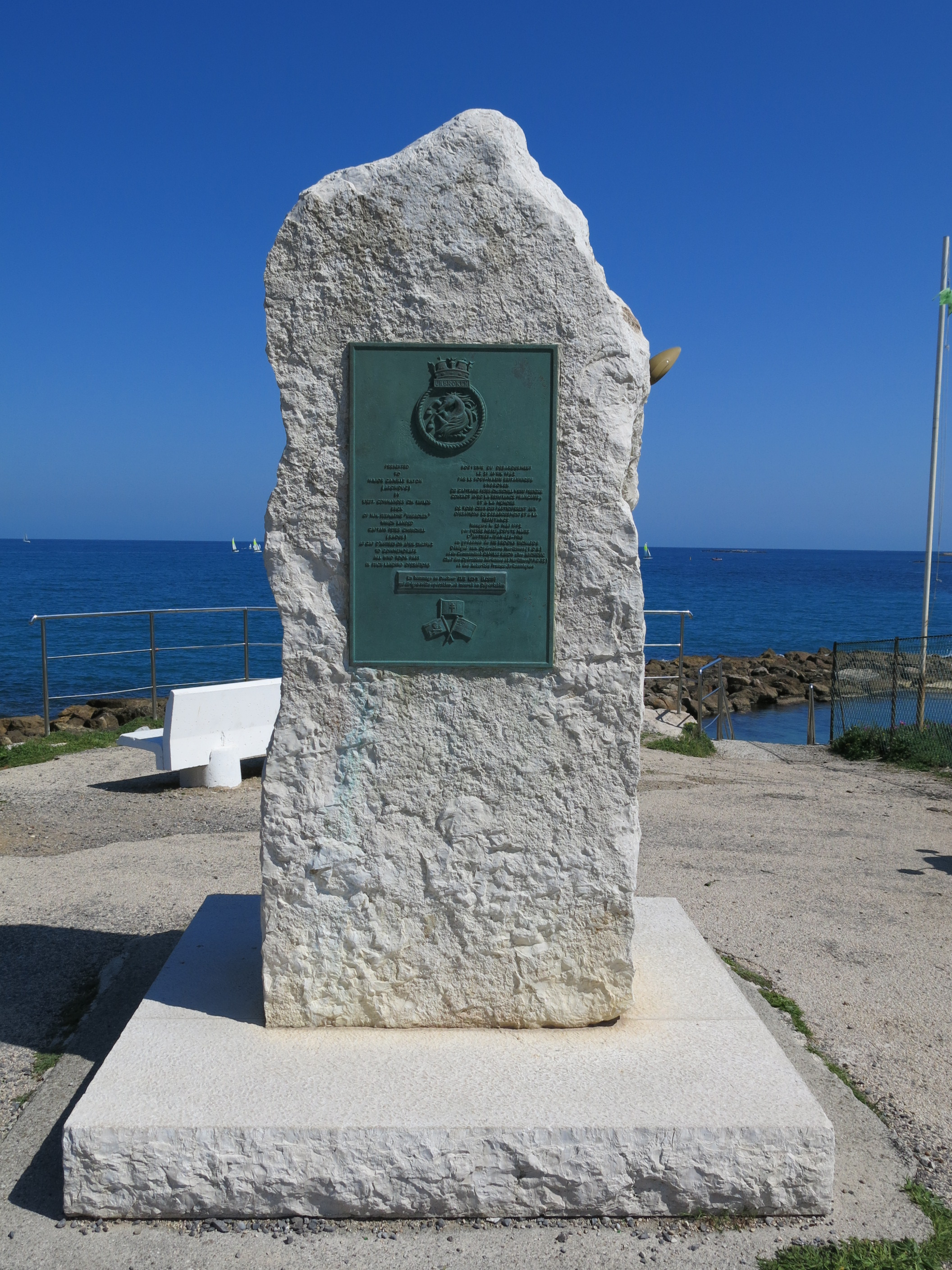
Monument in memory of the landing by Peter Churchill and his party from Unbroken in April 1942.

Unbroken was commissioned on 29 January 1942 as P42. After work up trials in Holy Loch, Unbroken went out to join the 10th Flotilla at Malta, with a work-up patrol from Gibraltar. She spent most of her wartime career in the Mediterranean. She landed saboteurs under the command of Captain Peter Churchill at Antibes in the south of France. She then proceeded to Malta to reform the 10th Flotilla in June 1942. She was the only submarine operating from Malta until United, Unruffled and Unrivalled joined. She took part in Operations Harpoon and Vigorous, in June 1942. In July 1942, Unbroken attacked the main west coast railway line on the Italian mainland, and succeeded in blocking the line for 24 hours. However, she received return fire from coastal artillery and sustained a hit on the battery, forcing her to return to Malta. She was badly damaged in October 1942, by a counter-attack by Italian escorts after hitting a tanker, and was again repaired at Malta.

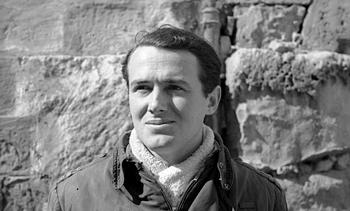
Lieutenant Alastair C G Mars, DSO, RN, commanding officer of HMS Unbroken

During her time in the Mediterranean, she sank the Italian merchants Edda and Bologna (the former French Monaco), the Italian pilot vessel F 20 / Enrica, and the Italian auxiliary minesweeper No. 17/Milano. She also damaged the Italian sailing vessel Vale Formoso II, the German (former Norwegian) tanker Regina, and most significantly, the Italian heavy cruiser Bolzano and the Italian light cruiser Muzio Attendolo during Operation Pedestal. Bolzano was hit in her oil tanks and set ablaze; she had to be beached at Panarea island; the Attendolo lost sixty feet of bow. Bolzano was out of action for the rest of the war.

Unbroken also attacked the Italian merchant Algerino, but missed her with her torpedoes. She later damaged the Italian merchant Titania, north-west of Tripoli, Libya. Titania was taken in tow by the Italian destroyer Ascari. Titania was sunk early the next day by HMS Safari. Unbroken returned to the UK in December 1943.

=== In Soviet service ===
Unbroken was transferred on loan to the Soviet Union on 26 June 1944, where she was renamed V-2 (Cyrillic: В-2). Sailing under Soviet flag she sank the German submarine chaser UJ-1220 on 12 October 1944. She spent four years in Soviet service before being returned to the Royal Navy in 1949. She was scrapped at Gateshead from 9 May 1950.

== Bibliography ==
- "HMS Unbroken (P 42)". uboat.net.
- "Ultimatum to Unbroken". British submarines of World War II. Archived from the original on 11 July 2007.
- Colledge, J. J.; Warlow, Ben (2006) [1969]. Ships of the Royal Navy: The Complete Record of All Fighting Ships of the Royal Navy from the 15th Century to the Present (3rd Rev ed.). London: Chatham Publishing. ISBN 978-1-86176-281-8. OCLC 67375475.
- Crabb, Brian James (2014). Operation Pedestal: The story of Convoy WS21S in August 1942. England: Shaun Tyas. ISBN 978-1-907730-19-1.
- Submarines, War Beneath The Waves, From 1776 To The Present Day, by Robert Hutchinson
