= John Linton =

Welsh military officer (1905–1943)

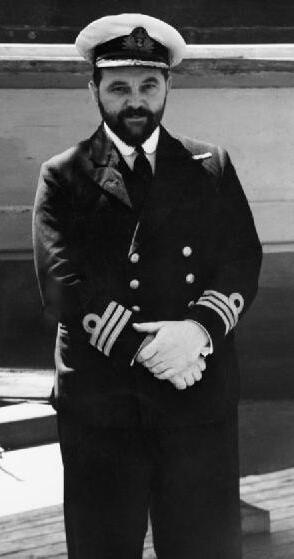
- Born: 15 October 1905; Newport, Wales
- Died: 23 March 1943 (aged 37); La Maddalena Harbour, Italy
- Military career
- Allegiance: United Kingdom
- Branch: Royal Navy
- Service years: 1926–1943
- Rank: Commander
- Nickname: "Tubby"
- Commands: HMS Pandora; HMS Turbulent
- Conflicts: Second World War: Mediterranean War
- Awards: Victoria Cross; Distinguished Service Order; Distinguished Service Cross

Commander John Wallace Linton, VC, DSO, DSC (15 October 1905 – 23 March 1943) was a Royal Navy submariner and a Welsh recipient of the Victoria Cross, the highest award for gallantry in the face of the enemy that can be awarded to British and Commonwealth forces. Nicknamed "Tubby", he was a Rugby football forward, playing for the Royal Navy, United Services, and Hampshire County teams.

== Naval career ==
Acting Sub-Lieutenant Linton was promoted to sub-lieutenant on 15 July 1926 and then lieutenant on 15 July 1928, with his seniority in rank subsequently adjusted. Found suitable for further promotion, he was promoted lieutenant commander on 1 July 1936.

In 1940 Linton was commander of the submarine Pandora operating in the Far East and in May 1940 brought her to Alexandria and on to Malta, where she was destroyed in the bombing attacks by the Luftwaffe on 1 April 1942.

=== Victoria Cross ===
Linton was 37 years old, and a commander in the Royal Navy during the Second World War, when the following deed took place for which he was awarded the Victoria Cross.

From the outbreak of the war in September 1939 to March 1943, which was the month of HMS Turbulent's last patrol in the Mediterranean, Commander Linton was responsible for sinking over 90,000 tons of enemy shipping, including a cruiser, a destroyer, a U-boat and 28 other ships. In addition Turbulent destroyed three trains by gun fire. In his last year Commander Linton spent 254 days at sea, submerged for nearly half the time, his ship was hunted 13 times and had 250 depth charges aimed at her.

Turbulent had sunk a huge amount of enemy shipping and endured numerous attacks. The Royal Navy states that:

Turbulent sank over 90,000 tons of enemy shipping. She was depth charged on over 250 occasions by enemy forces hunting her.

In recognition of this achievement, and the gallantry of Turbulent's crew, Linton was posthumously awarded the Victoria Cross on 25 May 1943. The citation read:

Commander Linton has been in command of submarines throughout the War. He has been responsible for the destruction of 1 cruiser, 1 destroyer, 20 merchant vessels, 6 schooners and 2 trains. A total of 81,000 tons of enemy shipping sunk. From 1st January 1942 to 1st January 1943 he spent 254 days at sea, including 2,970 hours diving. During this period he was hunted 13 times and had 250 depth charges dropped on him. His career has been one of conspicuous gallantry and extreme devotion to duty in the presence of the enemy.

Linton was reportedly killed in action in La Maddalena Harbour, Italy, on 23 March 1943. This has not been proven and the wreck of the submarine has never been found. Until it is, the cause and location of his death can only be surmised.

== Honours and awards ==
On 6 May 1941 Lieutenant-Commander John Wallace Linton of HMS Pandora was awarded the Distinguished Service Cross:

For courage and determination in sinking two Italian supply ships.

— London Gazette

On 15 September 1942 Commander John Wallace Linton, DSC, was appointed a Companion of the Distinguished Service Order:

For courage and skill in successful submarine patrols in HMS Turbulent.

— London Gazette

On 25 May 1943 Commander John Wallace Linton, DSO, DSC, was posthumously awarded the Victoria Cross for valour in command of HM Submarines:

From the outbreak of War until H.M.S. Turbulent's last patrol Commander Linton was constantly in command of submarines, and during that time inflicted great damage on the Enemy. He sank one Cruiser, one Destroyer, one U-boat, twenty-eight Supply Ships, some 100,000 tons in all, and destroyed three trains by gun-fire. In his last year he spent two hundred and fifty-four days at sea, submerged for nearly 'half the time, and his ship was hunted thirteen times and had two hundred and fifty depth charges aimed at her. His many and brilliant successes were due to his constant activity and skill, and the daring which never failed him when there was an Enemy to be attacked. On one occasion, for instance, in H.M.S. Turbulent, he sighted a convoy of two Merchantmen and two Destroyers in mist and moonlight. He worked round ahead of the convoy and dived to attack it as it passed through the moon's rays. On bringing his sights to bear he found himself right ahead of a Destroyer. Yet he held his course till the Destroyer was almost on top of him, and, when his sights came on the convoy, he fired. His great courage and determination were rewarded. He sank one Merchantman and one Destroyer outright, and set the other Merchantman on fire so that she blew up.

— London Gazette

The convoy attack specified in the citation occurred off Libya on 28/29 May 1942.

== Legacy ==
Linton's body was not recovered and his name appears on the Portsmouth Naval Memorial, Portsmouth, Hampshire, England. Panel 72. Column 3. His Victoria Cross is on display in the Lord Ashcroft Gallery at the Imperial War Museum, London. A JD Wetherspoon's public house has been renamed in his honour in his hometown of Newport.

Linton was not the only member of his family to be lost aboard a Royal Navy submarine. His eldest son, Sub-Lieutenant William F. Linton, was among the 75 men who perished when the A-class submarine HMS Affray was lost in a training exercise on 16 April 1951.

== See also ==
- List of Welsh Victoria Cross recipients
