= SS Scillin =

1903 cargo ship

History
- Name: H W Pellatt (1903–20); Memling (1920–24); Nicole le Borgne (1925–34); Giuliana Pagan (1934–35); Scillin Secundo (1935–37); Scillin (1937–42)
- Owner: Wm Petersen Ltd, Newcastle (1903–05); Canadian Lake & Ocean Nav Co, Newcastle (1905–11); Merchants Mutual Line, Newcastle (1911–17); Canadian Northern Steamships, London (1917–18); Canadian Steamship Lines, Montreal (1918–20); Société Belge d'Armament Maritime (1920–24); Cie. Charles le Borgne, Marseille (1925–34); Giuseppe Pagan, Venice (1934–35); Aurora SA di Nav, Genoa (1935–); Fratelli Bianchi Soc Di Nav, Genoa (–1942)
- Port of registry: (United Kingdom) Newcastle (1903–17); (United Kingdom) London (1917–18); (Canada) Montreal (1918–20); (Belgium) (1920–24); (France) Marseille (1925–34); (Kingdom of Italy) Venice (1934–35); (Kingdom of Italy) Genoa (1935–42)
- Builder: Russell and Company, Greenock, Scotland
- Yard number: 511
- Launched: 9 April 1903
- Completed: 1903
- Identification: UK official number 114446 (1903–20); Italian official number 263 (1934–35); Italian official number 2019 (1935–40); code letters OURC (1925–33); Call sign IOEK (1935–37); call sign IUFG (1937–42)
- Fate: Sunk, 14 November 1942

General characteristics
- Tonnage: 1,591 GRT; 951 NRT
- Length: 240.1 ft (73.2 m)
- Beam: 36.8 ft (11.2 m)
- Depth: 21.7 ft (6.6 m)
- Installed power: 196 NHP
- Propulsion: 3-cylinder triple-expansion steam engines; single screw
- Speed: 11 knots (20 km/h)

SS Scillin was a 1,591 GRT cargo steamship that was built in Scotland in 1903, passed through a succession of owners of various nationalities and had a succession of different names. She was built as H. M. Pellatt but was successively called Memling, Nicole Le Borgne, Giuliana Pagan, and Scillin Secondo before becoming Scillin in 1937.

By the time of the Second World War the ship was in Italian ownership. In 1942, a Royal Navy submarine sank her in the Mediterranean Sea when she was transporting over 800 Allied prisoners of war (POWs) from North Africa to Italy, killing nearly all of them. The United Kingdom kept the cause of her sinking secret until 1996, more than 50 years after the event.

== History ==
Russell and Company of Greenock, Renfrewshire built the ship in 1903 as H. M. Pellatt for William Petersen Ltd of Newcastle-upon-Tyne. She had a three-cylinder triple-expansion steam engine built by David Rowan and Company of Glasgow. It developed 196 NHP and drove her single screw, giving her a speed of 11 knots (20 km/h).

The Canadian Lake and Ocean Navigation Co of Newcastle bought H. M. Pellatt in 1905 and sold her in 1911 to the Merchants Mutual Line, also of Newcastle. Canadian Northern Steamships of London bought her in 1917 and sold her in 1918 to Canada Steamship Lines Ltd of Montreal. In 1920 the Société Belge d'Armement Maritime bought the ship and renamed her Memling. In 1924 or 1925 the Compagnie Charles Le Borgne of Marseille bought the ship and renamed her Nicole Le Borgne. In 1934 Giuseppe Pagan of Venice bought the ship and renamed her Giuliana Pagan. In 1935 Aurora SA di Navigazione of Genoa bought the ship and renamed her Scillin Secondo. In 1837 the company shortened her name to Scillin. By 1941 she was owned by Fratelli Bianchi Societá Di Navigazione of Genoa.

== Final voyage ==
In November 1942, in Tripoli, Libya, 814 Allied POWs were embarked in Scillin's hold, which, reportedly, was suitable for only about 300. The result was severe overcrowding and unsanitary conditions. More prisoners would have been embarked, but the British military doctor (Captain Gilbert, RAMC) made vehement and repeated protests. Some reports state that a further 195 POWs were embarked before Scillin sailed and that there were some 200 Italian troops aboard; others dispute these points saying that the only Italian troops aboard were guards and gun crews and the surplus POWs were never actually embarked. She sailed on 13 November 1942.

A British S-class submarine, HMS Sahib, intercepted Scillin on the night of 14 November off the coast of Tunisia. Sahib first fired two shells at the cargo ship and then launched a single torpedo, which hit Scillin's hold and rapidly sank her. Prisoners in the hold had little chance of survival. Sahib rescued 27 POWs (26 British and one South African), Scillin's captain and 34 Italian crew and soldiers before the arrival of an Italian warship obliged her to leave. Only when Sahib's crew heard survivors speaking English did they realise the ship's purpose.

== Official reaction ==
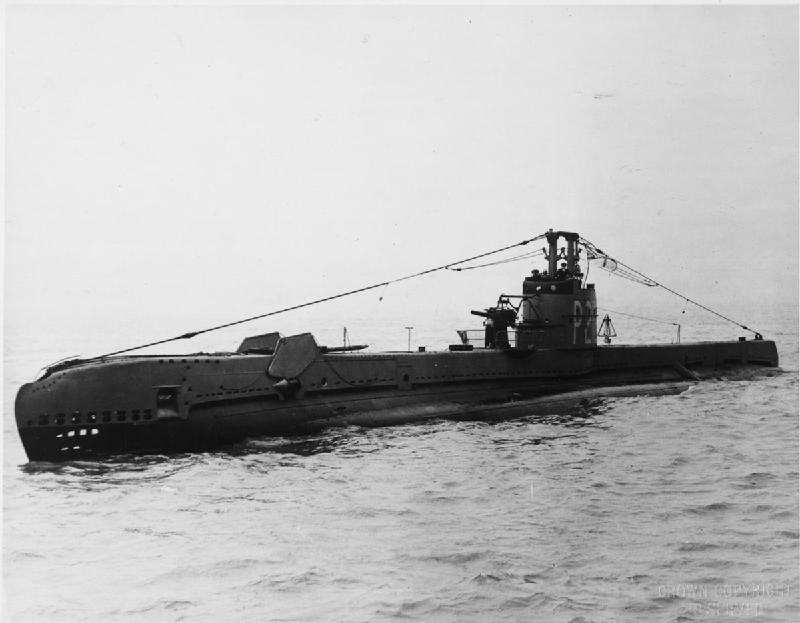
HMS Sahib

Royal Navy submarine commanders had been ordered not to attack enemy civilian ships that were en route from North Africa to Italy. In an inquiry, Sahib's commander (Lt John Bromage) was cleared of culpability, since he claimed that Scillin had borne no lights, he had believed that Scillin was carrying Italian troops, had appeared to be en route to Africa and had not responded to the initial shelling (two rounds), intended to halt her. In his log Lt Bromage never claimed to have fired any warning shots.

"Fired 12 rounds with the 3" gun and registered with 10". The ship was brought to. Closed to 750yds and fired one Torpedo into the engine room.
Sgt W D Heath R.T.R. (survivor) mistook the missed rounds as warning shots."

The patrol report clearly indicates that the Sahib was put on a course to intercept Scillin. The order came from Malta and was received during a radio listening watch as recorded in Lt Bromage's log.

Consideration was given to the prosecution of Italians for war crimes because of Scillin's lack of life-saving equipment and Italian attempts to batten down (i.e. close) her hatches where the POWs were kept, thus preventing their escape. Prosecution was abandoned due to lack of evidence. 787 or 788 POWs died aboard Scillin. Another source mentions 806 POWs lost, as well as 79 Italians.

== Secrecy and disclosure ==
The details of Scillin's loss and the circumstances of the death of the Allied POWs were kept secret for more than 50 years until persistent inquiries by relations and historians brought a more open response. The reasons for such official reticence for such a long period are not clear, but there are claims that it was deemed necessary to protect intelligence sources.

The first time information was made public was in 1996 when the Ministry of Defence records department put an account of the sinking and a list of POWs into an existing file at The National Archives. (WO311/304) Both the account of the sinking and the list of casualties were factually flawed. When the mistakes were pointed out the MoD accepted the errors, but no alterations have been made.

It was deemed important to conceal the source of the intelligence (Ultra) that so accurately predicted Scillin's position and schedule, enabling Sahib to intercept her, and also revealed that POWs were aboard. It should be remembered that Ultra was highly secret and great efforts were made to prevent the Axis discovering or disclosing that their signals were being read; Ultra's existence was not publicly disclosed until the 1970s.

Many measures were applied to protect Ultra intelligence. One was to overfly any intended shipping target before directing any interception and attack. Scillin's crew were interrogated when they were landed at Malta and disclosed that the ship had been sighted by aerial reconnaissance. Sahib was then given an interception course. This was standard practice when attacking shipping whose movements had been revealed by Ultra whether they had POW aboard or not. Thus if transports that carried POW were not attacked at all it would have been obvious that the Allies had prior knowledge of the ships' cargo.

The most complete account of Scillin's sinking and the role of Ultra was published in the September 2006 issue of the Royal Artillery Journal.

== Previous losses ==
Scillin was only one example of Allied POWs being killed when enemy ships were sunk in the Mediterranean. Five others had been sunk in the preceding year with 2,000 casualties; Ultra had predicted each of the POW transportations. There is a memorial plaque at the National Memorial Arboretum to the POWs lost at sea on Sebastiano Veniero (9 December 1941), Ariosto (15 February 1942), Tembien (27 February 42), Nino Bixio (17 August 1942), Loreto (13 October 1942) and Scillin (14 November 1942).
