= Archdale baronets =

Baronetcy in the Baronetage of the United Kingdom

The Archdale Baronetcy, of Riversdale in the County of Fermanagh, is a title in the Baronetage of the United Kingdom. It was created on 25 June 1928 for the Northern Irish politician Edward Archdale. The second Baronet was a vice-admiral in the Royal Navy. The third Baronet was a captain in the Royal Navy. As of 30 June 2017 the present holder of the baronetcy has not successfully proven his succession to the Archdale baronetcy and is therefore not on the Official Roll of the Baronetage. However, the case is under review by the Registrar of the Baronetage.

The family seat was Riversdale House, near Ballycassidy, County Fermanagh.

== Archdale baronets of Riversdale, Fermanagh ==
- Sir Edward Mervyn Archdale, 1st Baronet (1853–1943)
- Sir (Nicholas) Edward Archdale, 2nd Baronet (1881–1955)
- Sir Edward Archdale, 3rd Baronet (1921–2009)
- Sir Nicholas Edward Archdale, 4th Baronet (b. 1965)

The heir presumptive to the title is his first cousin, Peter Mervyn Archdale (b. 1953)
The heir presumptive's heir apparent is his son, Jonathan Talbot Archdale (b. 1982)

== Arms ==
Coat of arms of Archdale baronets

Notes
Granted 4 October 1928 by Sir Nevile Rodwell Wilkinson, Ulster King of Arms.
Crest
Out of a ducal crest coronet Or an heraldic tiger's head maned tufted and armed Sable.
Escutcheon
Quarterly 1st & 4th Azure a chevron Ermine between three talbots passant Or (Archdale) 2nd Or a chevron Sable (Mervyn) 3rd grandquarterly 1st & 4th Azure three fleurs-de-lis Or 2nd & 3rd Gules three gem-rings Gold all within a bordure Or charged with a tressure flory counterflory Gules in the centre point an inescutcheon Argent charged with a tilting spear and sword saltireways points upwards Proper (Montgomery).
Motto
Data Fata Secuta
