= MV Sebastiano Veniero =

Coordinates: 36°49′N 21°42′E

History

The Netherlands, Italy
- Name: Sebastiano Veniero (1939 laid down as); Jason (1940 launched as); Sebastiano Veniero (1940–41 completed as)
- Owner: Nederlandsche Stoomvaart Maatschappij Oceaan (1940), Società Italiana di Armamento (1940–41)
- Port of registry: (Netherlands) Amsterdam; (Kingdom of Italy) Fiume
- Ordered: 1939
- Builder: Cantieri Riuniti dell'Adriatico (CRDA)
- Yard number: 1,233
- Launched: 7 March 1940
- Completed: May 1940
- Identification: IMO number: 5614119; Call sign PFCC
- Fate: Torpedoed and beached, 9 December 1941

General characteristics
- Tonnage: 6,338 GRT; 6,116 DWT
- Length: 449 ft 6 in (137.01 m) p/p 471 ft (143.5 m) o/a
- Beam: 60 ft 11 in (18.6 m)
- Depth: 26 ft (8 m)
- Installed power: 1,320 NHP, 5,500 bhp
- Propulsion: FIAT diesel engine

MV Sebastiano Veniero, formerly MV Jason, was a 6,310 GRT cargo and passenger motor ship that was built in Monfalcone, Italy in 1940. In 1941 she was requisitioned by Germany. On 9 December, 1941 she was damaged by a Royal Navy submarine in the Mediterranean Sea, killing at least 300 UK and Dominion prisoners of war, and possibly many more. She did not sink but was beached on the coast of the Peloponnese, where she was torpedoed again a week later and became a total loss.

== Building and seizure ==
Lloyd Triestino ordered the ship in 1939 from Cantieri Riuniti dell'Adriatico (CRDA) of Fiume.

She had a six cylinder FIAT diesel engine and a speed of 14 knots (26 km/h).

Lloyd Triestino could not afford to pay for the ship, so CRDA sold her to Nederlandsche Stoomvaart Maatschappij Oceaan (NSMO), the Dutch subsidiary of the UK shipping company Blue Funnel Line. NSMO followed Blue Funnel's policy of naming its ships after figures from Greek antiquity and mythology. Sebastiano Veniero was renamed Jason after the mythological character of the same name.

Jason began her sea trials on 9 May 1940, before Italy entered the Second World War. But the next day Germany invaded the Netherlands, and Italian authorities seized her and assigned her to the Italian shipping company Società Italiana di Armamento (Sidarma). She was renamed Sebastiano Veniero after a 16th-century Venetian admiral and Doge, Sebastiano Venier (1496–1578). Her NSMO crew travelled to Marseille, whence the Blue Funnel ship Perseus repatriated them to the UK.

== Loss ==
Approximate position where Sebastiano Veniero was wrecked

On 9 December 1941 the ship was carrying about 2,000 UK and Dominion PoWs from North Africa to occupied Europe when the Royal Navy Grampus-class submarine HMS Porpoise torpedoed her off the south coast of the Peloponnese about 5 nautical miles (9 km) south of Pylos. Many of the PoWs were in her cargo holds, two of which were quickly flooded by the torpedo explosion. One source gives different figures for the total number of prisoners killed: either 300 or 450–500.

The holds were opened to release trapped PoWs and the damaged ship was beached close to Methoni Castle on Cape Methoni. Many PoWs jumped into the sea and took their chance to swim to the rocky shore. A South African lance corporal, Bernard Friedlander of the 3rd Battalion, Transvaal Scottish Regiment, swam ashore with a rope, which took him 90 minutes. The rope was then used to haul a cable ashore, which was made fast on land. Nearly 1,600 survivors then used the cable to reach safety.

Sebastiano Veniero remained stranded at Methoni, and on 15 December the British T-class submarine HMS Torbay hit her with another torpedo.

A German officer saw Friedlander's heroism on 9 December and recommended the lance corporal for a UK bravery award. In July 1945 Friedlander was awarded the George Medal. In 1947 King George VI toured South Africa, and at a ceremony in Johannesburg on 31 March personally decorated Friedlander with the medal.

== Records ==
Accounts of the sinking of the Sebastiano Veniero were recorded by several POWs on board. A book on the topic was published in 1983 entitled No Honour No Glory by Spence Edge and Jim Henderson.

== See also ==
- Loreto, Nino Bixio and Scillin, Italian merchant ships sunk in similar circumstances, also killing many British and Empire PoWs.
- SS Van Imhoff a Dutch ship carrying German internees to Ceylon, sunk by the Japanese.
- Hell Ships
