= Capo di Milazzo =

Peninsula on the island of Sicily, Italy

- Peninsula
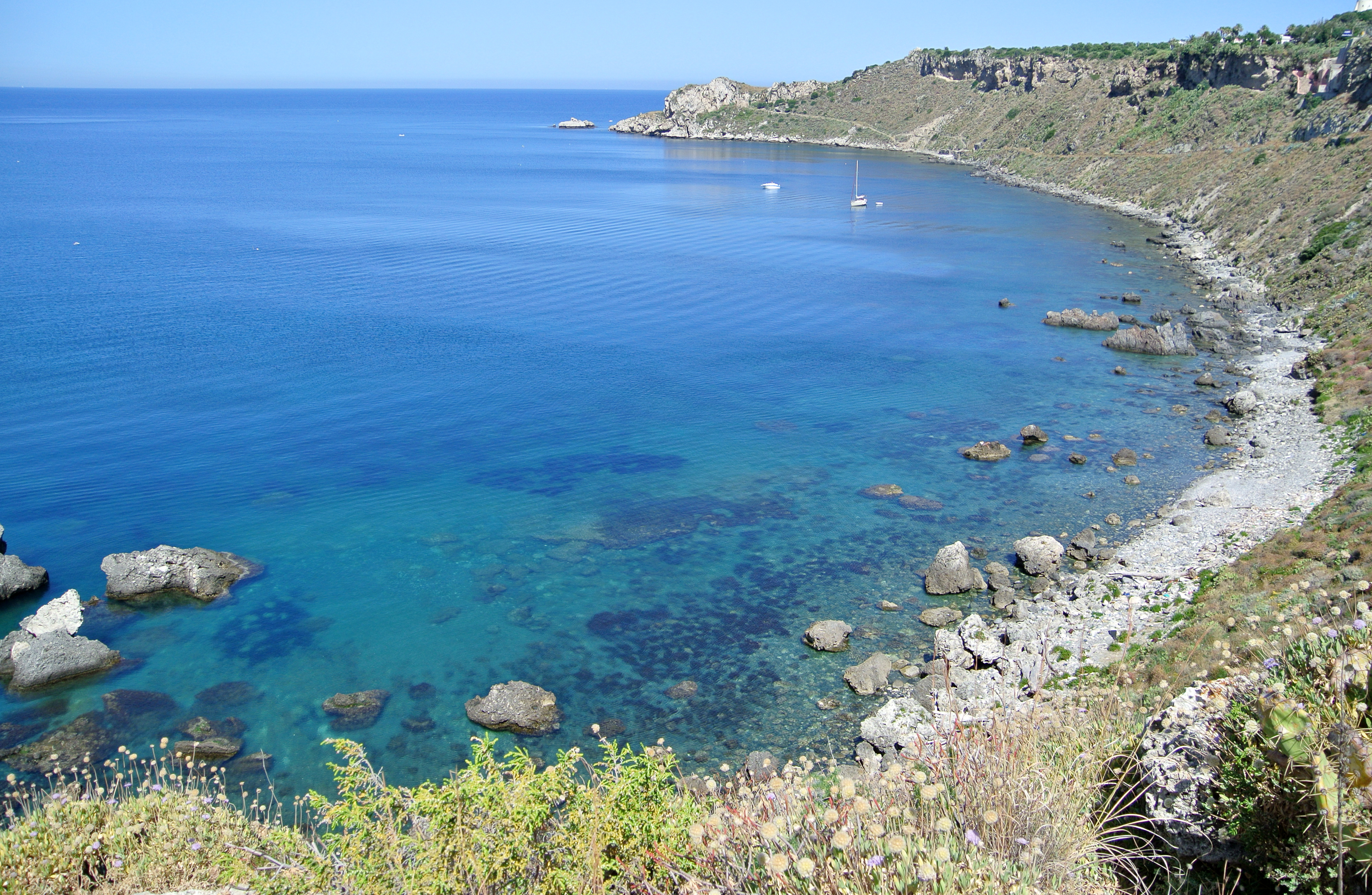
- Capo di Milazzo, Sicily

- Location within Sicily
- Coordinates: 38°16′13.7″N 15°13′51.4″E
- Location: Sicily, Italy
- Water bodies: Tyrrhenian Sea

Capo di Milazzo is a thin peninsula on the north eastern part of the island of Sicily which extends into the Tyrrhenian Sea towards the Lipari Islands. The town of Milazzo is located in the centre of the peninsula.

In 2019, a marine reserve of the promontory was established at the end of the cape.

== See also ==
- Capo Milazzo Lighthouse
