= HMS Thule =

Submarine of the Royal Navy

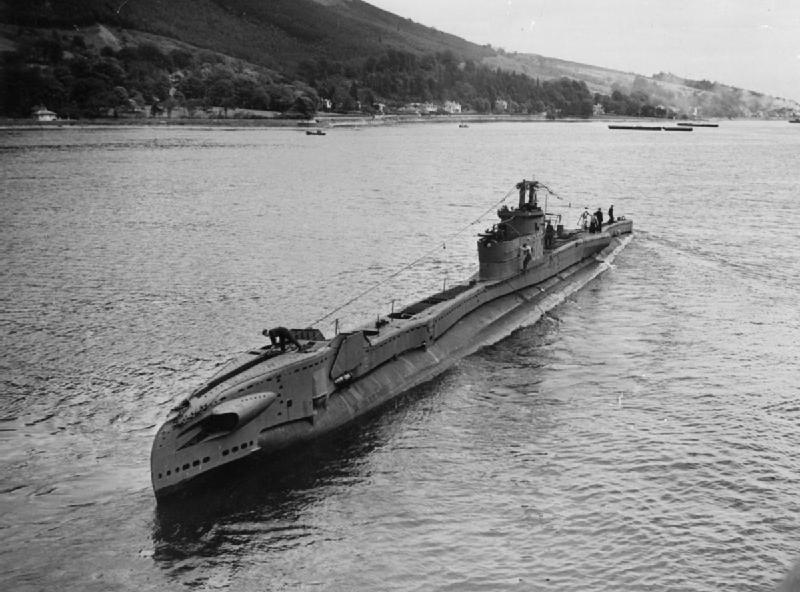

History

United Kingdom
- Name: HMS Thule
- Builder: Devonport Dockyard
- Laid down: 20 September 1941
- Launched: 22 October 1942
- Commissioned: 13 May 1944
- Identification: Pennant number P325
- Fate: Scrapped in September 1962
- Badge

General characteristics
- Class & type: T-class submarine
- Displacement: 1,290 tons surfaced; 1,560 tons submerged
- Length: 276 ft 6 in (84.28 m)
- Beam: 25 ft 6 in (7.77 m)
- Draught: 12 ft 9 in (3.89 m) forward; 14 ft 7 in (4.45 m) aft
- Propulsion: Two shafts; Twin diesel engines 2,500 hp (1,900 kW) each; Twin electric motors 1,450 hp (1,080 kW) each
- Speed: 15.5 knots (28.7 km/h; 17.8 mph) surfaced; 9 knots (17 km/h; 10 mph) submerged
- Range: 4,500 nmi (8,300 km; 5,200 mi) at 11 kn (20 km/h; 13 mph) surfaced
- Test depth: 300 ft (91 m) max
- Complement: 61
- Armament: 6 internal forward-facing 21 inch (533 mm) torpedo tubes; 2 external forward-facing torpedo tubes; 2 external amidships rear-facing torpedo tubes; 1 external rear-facing torpedo tubes; 6 reload torpedoes; QF 4-inch deck gun; 3 anti aircraft machine guns

HMS Thule was a British submarine of the third group of the T class. She was built as P325 at Devonport Dockyard, and launched on 22 October 1942. So far she has been the only ship of the Royal Navy to bear the name Thule, after Thule, the mythological name for a northern island.

== Service ==
Thule served in the Far East for much of her wartime career, where she sank thirteen junks, two lighters and five sampans with gunfire in the Strait of Malacca in a twelve-day period between 17 December 1944 to 29 December 1944. She also attacked a submarine, probably the Ro-113 and believed she had sunk it, but Thule's torpedoes exploded prematurely and the submarine escaped unharmed. She went on to sink a further five sailing vessels and three coasters, as well as laying a number of mines.

She survived the war and continued in service with the Navy. In May 1951, Thule was sent to Canada to train with the Royal Canadian Navy.

On 18 November 1960, Thule, a member of the 5th Submarine Squadron, was taking part in an anti-submarine exercise off Portland Bill, when she was accidentally rammed by the Royal Fleet Auxiliary tanker Black Ranger when at periscope depth. Thule's snort was broken, one of her periscopes was bent and her casing was damaged. The submarine was scrapped at Thos. W. Ward, Inverkeithing on 14 September 1962.

Her first commander, Alastair Mars, wrote HMS Thule Intercepts, about her operations from commissioning in Scotland to the end of the war in Australia.
