= HMS Unruffled =

Submarine of the Royal Navy

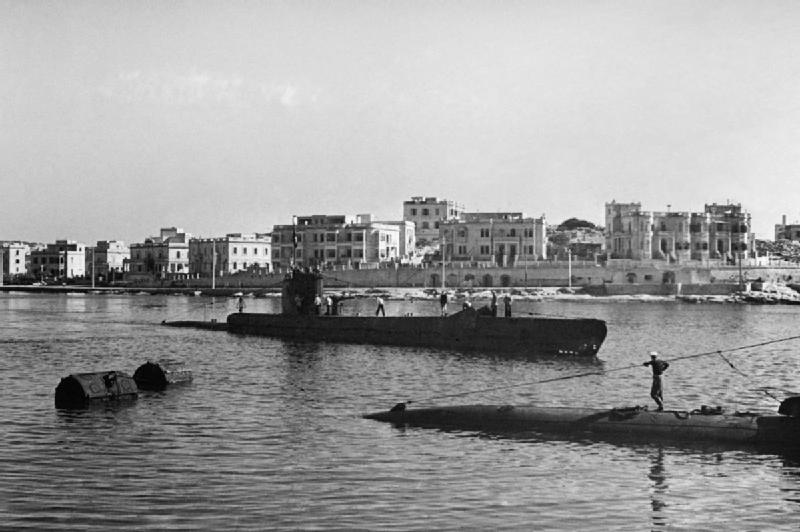
- HMS Unruffled returning to harbour in Malta after a patrol in the Mediterranean

History

United Kingdom
- Name: HMS Unruffled
- Builder: Vickers Armstrong, Barrow-in-Furness
- Laid down: 25 February 1941
- Launched: 19 December 1941
- Commissioned: 9 April 1942
- Identification: Pennant number P46
- Fate: Scrapped January 1946
- Badge

General characteristics
- Class & type: U-class submarine
- Displacement: Surfaced – 540 tons standard, 630 tons full load; Submerged – 730 tons
- Length: 191 feet (58 m)
- Beam: 16 feet 1 inch (4.90 m)
- Draught: 15 feet 2 inches (4.62 m)
- Propulsion: 2 shaft diesel-electric; 2 Paxman Ricardo diesel generators + electric motors; 615 hp (459 kW) / 825 hp (615 kW)
- Speed: 11.25 knots (20.8 km/h) max surfaced; 10 knots (19 km/h) max submerged
- Complement: 27–31
- Armament: 4 × bow internal 21 inch (533 mm) torpedo tubes; 8–10 torpedoes; 1 × 3-inch (76 mm) gun

HMS Unruffled was a Royal Navy U-class submarine built by Vickers-Armstrong at Barrow-in-Furness, and operated from April 1942 until being scrapped in January 1946. So far she has been the only ship of the Royal Navy to bear the name Unruffled.

During the Second World War Unruffled served in the Battle of the Mediterranean from August 1942 to October 1943, operating primarily against Axis shipping; in all, she sank or severely damaged roughly 40,000 tons of shipping. She also severely damaged the Italian cruiser Attilio Regolo, and contributed to the Allied invasion of Sicily.

After departing the Mediterranean, Unruffled spent the rest of the war being refitted and undergoing exercises. Following the close of hostilities, she was scrapped in January 1946.

== Construction ==
Unruffled was ordered on 23 August 1940, as part of a batch of twelve U-class submarines for construction by Vickers-Armstrong in Barrow-in-Furness. The funds for her construction had been raised through the War Savings Campaign by the town of Colchester – a total of £435,233 being raised, against a target of £250,000. The town also provided the boat's Paxman engines, while locals sent the crew clothes and letters.

The keel was laid down on 25 February 1941, and the submarine was launched on 19 December 1941.

Initially the submarine was known as P46, as Royal Navy submarines at the time did not have names; however, Winston Churchill changed this policy in late 1942 for reasons of morale, and the submarine was given the name HMS Unruffled.

== Career ==
=== Early service ===
P46 slipped her moorings for the first time on 8 April 1942, under the command of Lieutenant John Samuel Stevens, and transferred to Holy Loch for sea trials.

P46 departed Holy Loch on 13 May 1942, transferring to Lerwick where she began her first wartime patrol on 16 May, operating off of the North Sea coast of Norway. During this time, Royal Navy submarines were prohibited from surfacing to take navigational fixes during daylight hours; as a result, P46 strayed 90 miles (140 km) off station and encountered fellow U-class submarine HNoMS Uredd (formerly P41). The patrol proved otherwise uneventful, and P46 returned to Lerwick on 1 June having encountered no hostile ships.

P46 then departed for Gibraltar, arriving on the morning of 25 June, one of four U-class submarines reassigned to Mediterranean waters that month. While in Gibraltar in July 1942, one of the crew was given a cat by a Wren as they were passing through the dockyard. The crew of P46 adopted the cat to be the ship's cat, and named him Timoshenko after the Russian general Semyon Timoshenko. Timoshenko went on to join P46 on all of her twenty wartime patrols in the Mediterranean in 1942-43. He was considered a good luck charm by the crew – so much so that, on one occasion, leaving port was delayed until he could be found.

=== Battle of the Mediterranean ===
P46 left Gibraltar on 1 August 1942 to take part in Operation Pedestal, an escort operation to convoy supplies to the besieged island of Malta. On 10 August P46 sighted the Italian merchant ship Siculo off of Marettimo and fired three torpedoes, all of which missed the target. P46 arrived at Malta on 15 August.

P46's first successful action would not come until her third Mediterranean war patrol, when she claimed three victories in just two days. The first of these came on 21 September when she engaged the Italian auxiliary minesweepers N10 / Aquila and S. Michele with her three-inch gun off the coast of Tunisia. Aquila was destroyed, while S. Michele escaped unscathed. A second victory was to come half an hour later, when P46 sighted the Vichy French merchant ship Liberia and torpedoed her, causing her to sink.

The following day, P46 engaged the Italian merchant ship SS Leonardo Palomba. P46's first torpedoes missed, at which point she surfaced to engage with the three-inch gun, firing four shots before being forced to submerge by return fire from Leonardo Palomba's machine gun. P46 shadowed Leonardo Palomba for just over an hour before engaging with torpedoes again, hitting the ship amidships and igniting her petrol stores. Following this engagement, P46 returned to Malta.

On her following patrol, P46 surfaced off the coast of Calabria in the early hours of the morning on 9 October, and opened fire on a passing train; two hits were observed, but damage was very light. Two days later on 11 October, P46 encountered an Italian cargo ship, Una, near Capri. P46 first engaged with four torpedoes, however Una's captain sighted the torpedo tracks and slowed the engines, causing the torpedoes to pass harmlessly ahead of the ship. Una attempted to return to the safety of port in Naples, however P46 attacked again within a fifth torpedo, hitting Una amidships and igniting volatile cargo, causing her to sink within the hour.

P46's next action came on 13 October, torpedoing and sinking the Italian cargo ship Loreto. Unbeknownst to the crew of P46, Loreto had been carrying 350 prisoners of war from the British Indian Army, 130 of whom died. British intelligence had been aware that Loreto was carrying prisoners of war since 9 October and had transmitted the information, but this was not known to the crew of P46.

On 2 November P46 put to sea as part of Operation Torch, the Allied invasion of French North Africa, with orders to attack enemy warships that may have interfered with the landings; she was joined by three other U-class submarines, while a further four carried landing parties. On 6 November P46 sighted an Italian U-boat (most likely Bronzo) and gave chase, firing four torpedoes with no success.

On 8 November, P46 encountered an Italian flotilla led by the cruiser Attilio Regolo and attacked with a torpedo that shattered the cruiser's bow. At this point P46 was out of torpedoes, and forced to break off the attack. A follow-up attack was mounted by HMS United, but she was unable to cause any damage, and Attilio Regolo was towed to dry dock, where she spent the rest of the war. P46 returned to Malta, arriving on 11 November.

P46 was back at sea on 16 November, and on 21 November unsuccessfully engaged an Italian tug with the three-inch gun; jamming was a recurrent problem among U-class submarines at the time. P46 returned to port on 29 November. Her next patrol began on 10 December. On 14 December, she encountered an Italian convoy, which was under attack by submarine HMS Sahib. P46 joined the attack, sinking the tanker Castelverde, while Sahib sank Honestas.

The following day P46 sighted and sank another Italian merchant vessel, Sant'Antioco. Following this she was attacked by an Italian aircraft dropping depth charges, which caused minor damage to P46, but ultimately she survived and returned to Malta on 18 December.

In early January 1943 P46 accompanied Operation Principal, a frogman attack on Palermo, and recovered two crews after they deployed their Chariot manned torpedoes. Her next patrol saw her engage a schooner with her three-inch gun on 23 January, before being forced to submerge by shore guns. On 26 January she engaged and sank the Italian Z 90 / Redentore with her three-inch gun; the crew were forced to abandon ship, and a boarding party from Unruffled found it already awash and sinking. A further success came on 31 January against the German SS Lisbon, which P46 intercepted en-route to north Africa.

The patrol concluded on 2 February, and while in port, P46 was formally named HMS Unruffled. The captain of the 10th Submarine Flotilla commented that this was a name "well suited to her commanding officer [Stevens]," whose judgement in intercepting SS Lisbon he commended.

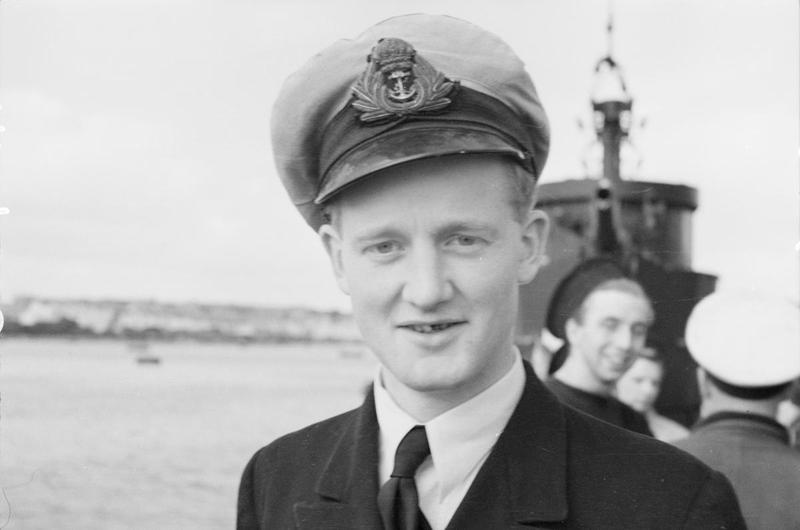
Unruffled's Second Lieutenant Oliver Lascelles pictured in front of the boat on 4 February 1943; Lascelles would go on to command Unruffled later in his career

Unruffled's first engagement since being named came on 18 February, when she fired on two schooners, hitting neither but forcing both crews to abandon ship. The schooners were wrecked on the shore, but as Unruffled had not damaged them, they were not added to her tally. On 21 February Unruffled sank the German merchant vessel Baalbek. She returned to Malta on 24 February.

Unruffled's next patrol saw two crew members board an abandoned lighter and sink it with a demolition charge on 16 March. Her next two patrols were reconnaissance patrols in advance of Operation Husky, the Allied invasion of Sicily, during which she also acted as a marker vessel for troop landings. Her next combat patrol began on 25 May, and saw her sink the French tanker Henri Desprez on 3 June. An attempted counter-attack with depth charges proved unsuccessful, and Unruffled returned unharmed to Malta on 8 June.

From 24 June to 10 July, Unruffled undertook another two reconnaissance patrols. Her next combat patrol began on 27 July, and saw the sinking of the Italian troopship Città di Catania as she entered Brindisi on 3 August, having first unsuccessfully engaged the ship two days earlier.

Unruffled was in Malta from 10 to 22 August, when she again took to sea. She had on board two Greek officers, who she delivered to Cephalonia on 25 August to undertake sabotage missions as part of Operation Seaman. Two days later she engaged and sank the Italian merchant vessel Città di Spezia with a full salvo of torpedoes. She returned to Malta on 5 September, in time for the crew to celebrate the Armistice of Cassibile (the formal surrender of Italy to the Allies), which was made public on 8 September.

Unruffled departed Malta for her twentieth and final patrol in the Mediterranean on 26 September, and docked in Algiers on 9 October. En-route, she attacked an unidentified German merchant vessel on 5 October, but did not record a hit. The RNSubs website identifies the ship as the German merchant Pommern, and suggests that Unruffled successfully torpedoed her, however this is not recorded in other sources. German-language sources record the loss of Pommern on this date in close proximity to the location recorded in Unruffled's logs, but attribute it to an Italian sea-mine.

=== Post-Mediterranean service ===
In Algiers, the crew spent a week aboard HMS Maidstone, before departing for Britain on 17 October. Unruffled stopped in Gibraltar from 21 October to 4 November, where she parted company with ship's cat Timoshenko; the submarine's departure from Gibraltar came when the cat was ashore, and could not be delayed. The crew would later adopt two further cats, who they named Timoshenko II and Timoshenko III.

Unruffled reached Gosport on 18 November. This was to be the end of Unruffled's combat career. After undergoing a refit at Tilbury, she spent the rest of the war participating in exercises from Bermuda. Following the end of the war, she was scrapped at Troon in January 1946.

== Legacy ==
The town of Colchester, which had funded the construction of Unruffled and maintained a close association with her, was presented with a commemorative plaque by the Admiralty in December 1942, bearing the words 'Burdened but Unruffled'. At some point in the post-war years, the plaque was lost, before being re-discovered and put back on display in Colchester Town Hall on 14 March 2012.

== Successes ==
Ships sunk (Note: Military vessels are listed by tons displacement.)
Date	Ship	Flag	GRT	Notes
21 September 1942	Aquila	Fascist Italy	305	Minesweeper
21 September 1942	Liberia	Vichy France	3,890	Merchant ship
22 September 1942	Leonardo Palomba	Fascist Italy	1,110	Merchant ship
11 October 1942	Una	Fascist Italy	1395	Merchant ship
13 October 1942	Loreto	Fascist Italy	1395	129 Indian prisoners of war killed
14 December 1942	Castelverde	Fascist Italy	6,958	Transport
15 December 1942	Sant'Antioco	Fascist Italy	4,944	Merchant ship
23 January 1943	Amabile Carolina	Fascist Italy	39	Sailing vessel
25 January 1943	Teodolinda	Fascist Italy	361	Tanker
26 January 1943	Z 90 / Redentore	Fascist Italy	46	Naval auxiliary
31 January 1943	Lisboa	Nazi Germany	1,799	Merchant ship
21 February 1943	Baalbeck	Nazi Germany	2,115	Merchant ship
3 June 1943	Henry Desprez	Vichy France	9,895	Tanker; in German service
3 August 1943	Città di Catania	Fascist Italy	3,335	Merchant ship
27 August 1943	Città di Spezia	Fascist Italy	2,474	Merchant ship
