= George Nurse (VC) =

Recipient of the Victoria Cross

George Nurse VC
- Born: 14 April 1873; Enniskillen, County Fermanagh
- Died: 25 November 1945 (aged 72); Liverpool, England
- Military career
- Allegiance: United Kingdom
- Branch: British Army
- Service years: 1892–1918
- Rank: Lieutenant
- Units: Royal Artillery
- Conflicts: Second Boer War; World War I
- Awards: Victoria Cross

George Edward Nurse VC (14 April 1873 – 25 November 1945) was born in Enniskillen, County Fermanagh, Ireland. He was educated in Guernsey in the Channel Islands where both his parents had been born. He was an Irish recipient of the Victoria Cross, the highest award for gallantry in the face of the enemy that can be awarded to British and Commonwealth forces.

== Details ==
Nurse was 26 years old, and a corporal in the 66th Battery, Royal Field Artillery, British Army, during the Second Boer War when the following deed took place during the Battle of Colenso for which he was awarded the VC:

At Colenso on the 15th December, 1899, the detachments serving the guns of the 14th and 66th Batteries, Royal Field Artillery, had all been either killed, wounded, or driven from their guns by Infantry fire at close range, and the guns were deserted. About 500 yards behind the guns was a donga in which some of the few horses and drivers left alive were sheltered. The intervening space was swept with shell and rifle fire. Captain Congreve, Rifle Brigade, who was in the donga, assisted to hook a team into a limber, went out; and assisted to limber up a gun. Being wounded, he took shelter; but, seeing Lieutenant Roberts fall, badly wounded, he went out again and brought him in. Captain Congreve was shot through the leg, through the toe of his boot, grazed on the elbow and the shoulder, and his horse shot in three places...

Lieutenant Roberts assisted Captain Congreve. He was wounded in three places...

Corporal Nurse also assisted.

== Further information ==
He achieved the rank of lieutenant with the Royal Artillery during World War I. He died in Liverpool on 25 November 1945.

== The medal ==
His Victoria Cross is displayed at the Royal Artillery Museum, Woolwich, London.

== See also ==
- List of Channel Islands Victoria Cross recipients
