= Alastair Mars =

British writer (1915–1985)

Alastair Mars, DSO, DSC and Bar
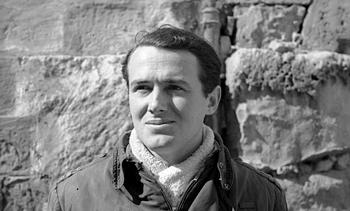
- Lieutenant Alastair Mars during his time as captain of HMS Unbroken
- Born: 1 January 1915; St John's, Dominion of Newfoundland
- Died: 12 March 1985 (aged 70); Ipswich, Suffolk, England
- Military career
- Allegiance: United Kingdom
- Branch: Royal Navy
- Service years: 1932–1952
- Rank: Lieutenant Commander
- Commands: HMS Unbroken; HMS Thule
- Conflicts: World War II: Battle of the Mediterranean; Far East
- Awards: DSO DSC and bar
- Other work: Author of several autobiographies and novels.

Lieutenant Commander Alastair Campbell Gillespie Mars, DSO, DSC and Bar (1 January 1915 – 12 March 1985) was a Royal Navy World War II submarine commander.

In 1952, he was court martialled and dismissed from the service under controversial circumstances and pursued a career as an author.

== Early career ==
Mars joined the Royal Navy as a cadet in 1932, and was assigned to the cruiser HMS Norfolk. Promoted to midshipman in 1933, he was further promoted to acting sub-lieutenant in January 1936. In December he was appointed to the submarine HMS Grampus which was then building, and in April 1937 to HMS Swordfish. He was promoted to lieutenant on his assignment to HMS Medway, the submarine depot ship of the China Station. In April 1938 he has appointed to HMS Regulus.

== World War II ==
After spending a short period on HMS H44, in November 1941, Mars was appointed as commanding officer of HMS Unbroken, which he served on until June 1943 on operations in the Mediterranean. During Operation Pedestal in August 1942, Unbroken torpedoed and severely damaged the two Italian cruisers Bolzano and Muzio Attendolo.

From August 1943 to December 1943, he was a staff officer at HMS Dolphin submarine base in Portsmouth. In December 1943, he was placed in command of HMS Thule in the Far East, remaining there until November 1945.

== Postwar ==
After the war Mars was posted 1946 to HMS Dolphin but was eventually assigned to a post in New Zealand, where Mars' pay of 39 Pounds per week as a lieutenant commander proved inadequate to support him, his wife and his two children. The Royal Navy spent four years arguing over an extra living allowance before it was paid. With a sick wife, he was then assigned to Hong Kong where he was unable to afford even the single hotel room he rented. Becoming ill himself and heavily in debt, he returned to the United Kingdom and hospital. On his discharge he requested leave to try to put his finances in order but this was refused. He was ordered to report to Portsmouth but he wrote from his home in London to the Navy refusing to do so and requesting his retirement. He commented in his letter that "I do not wish to plague My Lords with a mass of detail mainly repugnant to them. It should be sufficient to say that I have lost faith in the present governmental hierarchy and all that goes with it".

Mars entered politics as a parliamentary candidate for the Liberal Party at the 1950 General Election. He contested the constituency of Windsor, but finished third.

Mars was arrested and court martialled for insubordination and absence without leave, which resulted in his dismissal from the Royal Navy in June 1952. The controversy over his dismissal was the subject of a parliamentary question the following month, when the future prime minister James Callaghan asked the then First Lord of the Admiralty whether Mars would receive his pension.

== Author ==
Following his dismissal from the Royal Navy, Mars became a successful author, publishing several autobiographical works and novels. He died in Ipswich in 1985.

== Bibliography ==
- Unbroken, the story of a submarine, autobiographical published 1953 (some editions titled as Unbroken, the true story of a submarine)
- Court Martial, autobiographical published 1954
- Arctic submarine, novel published 1955
- HMS Thule Intercepts, autobiographical published 1956
- Submarine at bay, novel published 1956
- Atomic submarine. A story of tomorrow, novel published 1957
- Fire in anger, novel published 1958
- Mediterranean wolfpack, novel published 1960
- Deep escape, novel published 1962
- Submarine attack, novel published 1965
- Three great sea stories : Malta convoy, Tinkerbelle, Unbroken, with Peter Shankland and Anthony Hunter, published 1968
- British Submarines at War, 1939–1945, published 1971
