= SS Van Imhoff =

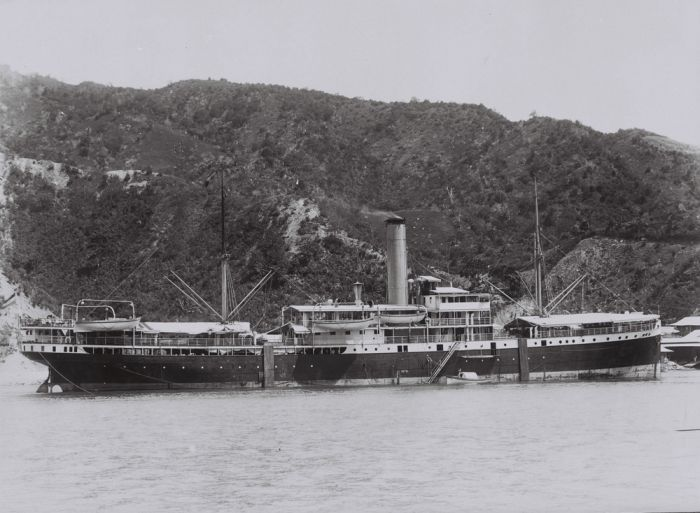

History
- Name: Van Imhoff
- Launched: June 1914
- Completed: 22 September 1914
- Fate: Bombed and sunk 18 January 1942

General characteristics
- Type: Cargo ship
- Tonnage: 2,980 GRT
- Length: 99 m (325.5 ft)
- Installed power: 3-cylinder triple expansion steam engine
- Propulsion: 1 × single-screw propeller
- Speed: 11.5 knots (21 km/h; 13 mph)

SS Van Imhoff was a Dutch-built cargo-passenger vessel that was constructed at the Fijenoord shipyard, Rotterdam, in 1914. The ship was 99 m (325.5 ft) long, with a speed of 11.5 knots (21 km/h; 13 mph). It was a single-screw propeller ship, driven by a one three-cylinder, triple expansion steam engine. It was operated by Koninklijke Paketvaart-Maatschappij.

In January 1942 the ship was sunk by a Japanese warplane while carrying German internees from the Dutch East Indies to Ceylon. The location of the Van Imhoff's wreck is unknown.

== Sinking ==
On 18 January 1942, the ship departed from Sibolga, Dutch East Indies, bound for Ceylon. On board were the captain, Hermanus Hoeksema, the Dutch crew, soldiers from Royal Netherlands East Indies Army (KNIL) and 473 German internees (crews of captured German merchant vessels and civilians with German backgrounds). Some prisoners were held below and some in hastily created cages on deck. At 10 a.m. on the following day the ship was attacked by a Japanese Mitsubishi G4M bomber and sustained damage towards the bow. This caused the ship immediately to begin listing towards the port side. At 1 p.m., the decision was taken to abandon ship. The first lifeboat was lowered into the water, while crew and guards onboard kept the prisoners below deck. Over the next hour or so, five of the six lifeboats were lowered into the sea. As the last Dutch seamen and soldiers left the ship, the prisoners were released. The single remaining lifeboat, some bamboo life rafts and a workboat took some 200 of the internees; the remainder drowned.

== Rescue ==
The crew's lifeboats reached land at Poelo Simoe (one of the Batu Islands) in safety. The Dutch authorities alerted merchant vessels in the area and despatched a rescue tug from Padang, with a small party of KNIL soldiers to guard any German survivors. Because of a shortage of fuel, only one Catalina patrol aircraft of the Dutch Naval Air Force at Medan was despatched. Shortly after dawn on 20 January, the KPM ship MV Boelongan, guided by the patrol aircraft, approached the rafts. Captain Marius L. Berveling of the MV Boelongan confirmed that no Dutch nationals were among the survivors, and left the scene without rescuing anyone. Of the internees who escaped the ship, only those in the two boats, which made landfall at Nias, survived; all those on the liferafts died.

== Aftermath ==
In 1956 a Dutch judicial investigation into the incident concluded: "No reason for a criminal complaint was found". In 2021, however, the Netherlands defence ministry directed the Netherlands Institute for Military History to reopen the investigation. The result was delivered to the Dutch parliament in October 2025. The report acknowledged that the Dutch government had, for many years, attempted to suppress the horrific facts of the incident, and a formal apology was made to the descendants of the victims.

== See also ==
SS Suez Maru
