= Italian destroyer Freccia (1930) =

Destroyer of the Regia Marina

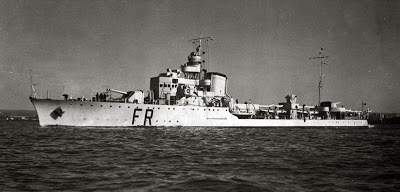
- Freccia in 1938

History

Kingdom of Italy
- Name: Freccia
- Namesake: Arrow
- Builder: Cantiere navale di Riva Trigoso, Riva Trigoso
- Laid down: 20 February 1929
- Launched: 3 August 1930
- Completed: 21 October 1931
- Fate: Sunk by aircraft, 8 August 1943

General characteristics (as built)
- Class & type: Freccia-class destroyer
- Displacement: 1,225 t (1,206 long tons) (standard); 2,150 t (2,120 long tons) (full load)
- Length: 96.15 m (315 ft 5 in)
- Beam: 9.75 m (32 ft 0 in)
- Draught: 3.15 m (10 ft 4 in)
- Installed power: 3 Thornycroft boilers; 44,000 hp (33,000 kW)
- Propulsion: 2 shafts; 2 geared steam turbines
- Speed: 30 knots (56 km/h; 35 mph)
- Range: 4,600 nmi (8,500 km; 5,300 mi) at 12 knots (22 km/h; 14 mph)
- Complement: 185
- Sensors & processing systems: R600A Metox radar warning receiver (1942)
- Armament: 2 × twin 120 mm (4.7 in) guns; 2 × single 40 mm (1.6 in) AA guns; 2 × twin 13.2 mm (0.52 in) machine guns; 2 × triple 533 mm (21 in) torpedo tubes; 2 × depth charge throwers; 54 mines

Freccia was the lead ship of her class of four destroyers built for the Regia Marina (Royal Italian Navy) in the early 1930s. Completed in 1931, she served in World War II and previous conflicts.

== Design and description ==
The Freccia-class destroyers were enlarged and improved versions of the preceding Turbine class. They had an overall length of 96.15 meters (315 ft 5 in), a beam of 9.75 meters (32 ft 0 in) and a mean draft of 3.15 meters (10 ft 4 in). They displaced 1,225 metric tons (1,206 long tons) at standard load, and 2,150 metric tons (2,120 long tons) at deep load. Their complement during wartime was 185 officers and enlisted men.

The Freccias were powered by two Parsons geared steam turbines, each driving one propeller shaft using steam supplied by three Thornycroft boilers. The turbines were designed to produce 44,000 shaft horsepower (33,000 kW) and a speed of 30 knots (56 km/h; 35 mph) in service, although the ships reached speeds of 38–39 knots (70–72 km/h; 44–45 mph) during their sea trials while lightly loaded. They carried enough fuel oil to give them a range of 4,600 nautical miles (8,500 km; 5,300 mi) at a speed of 12 knots (22 km/h; 14 mph).

Their main battery consisted of four 120-millimeter (4.7 in) guns in two twin-gun turrets, one each fore and aft of the superstructure. Anti-aircraft (AA) defense for the Freccia-class ships was provided by a pair of 40-millimeter (1.6 in) AA guns in single mounts amidships and a pair of twin-gun mounts for 13.2-millimeter (0.52 in) machine guns. They were equipped with six 533-millimeter (21 in) torpedo tubes in two triple mounts amidships. Although the ships were not provided with a sonar system for anti-submarine work, they were fitted with a pair of depth charge throwers. From August 1942 she featured a Metox radar warning device. The Freccias could carry 54 mines.

== Construction and career ==
Freccia was laid down by Cantieri del Tirreno at their Riva Trigoso shipyard on 20 February 1929, launched on 30 August 1930 and commissioned on 21 October 1931. Freccia was assigned to the 7th Squadron of destroyers, composed of four ships of her class.

=== Spanish Civil War ===
In August 1937, the Italian Fascist government decided the intervention of the Italian navy in the Nationalist blockade of the Spanish Republic in the context of the Spanish Civil War. Freccia was part of a large naval force deployed to the Sicilian Channel. The operation began on 9 August 1937.

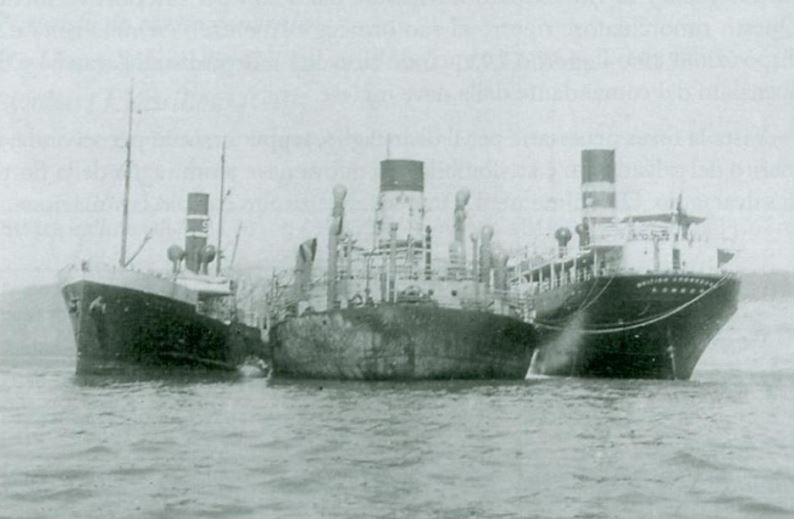
The Italian tug Centauro and the British tanker British Commodore assisting the badly damaged George W. McKnight off Bizerte

On 14 August 1937, the Italian destroyer shadowed a Panamanian-flagged tanker, supported by the torpedo boat Cigno and the Spanish Nationalist auxiliary cruisers Puchol and Mallorca. Freccia's commander was under the impression that they were tracking the Republican tanker Campeador, unaware that the latter had been torpedoed and sunk by her sister ship Saetta on 11 August. The tanker was actually the George W. McKnight, owned by the American Panama Transport Company and chartered by the German chapter of the Esso. The captain was American and the rest of the complement German. At 21:15, Freccia launched five torpedoes; only one of them struck home, hitting George W. McKnight's abreast the stern. The destroyer also fired 53 rounds from her 120 mm guns (29 armour-piercing and 24 high-explosive). Badly damaged, the tanker was abandoned by her crew and later assisted by the tanker British Commodore and the Italian tug Centauro. After transferring her cargo to the British tanker off Bizerte, the captain of the George W. McKnight ceded the ownership of the oiler to the Italian company Tripcovich, which towed the ship to Trieste to be repaired and, after several months of work, sold it to a British company under the name of Esso Edinburgh.

=== Invasion of Albania ===
As part of the 4th Naval Group, Freccia supported the Italian landings at Santi Quaranta on 7 April 1939. The destroyer, together with Baleno, landed 150 marines from the San Marco Battalion. The weak Albanian resistance ashore was routed with the assistance of the ships' main guns.

=== World War II ===
During the battle of the Mediterranean, the burden of escorting Axis convoys to Libya, Greece and Tunisia fell to the Freccia-class and the Navigatori-class destroyers.

At the head of the 7th Squadron, Freccia led her sister ships Dardo, Saetta and Strale to a fruitless torpedo charge against the British Fleet in the last stages of the battle of Calabria, on 9 July 1940. The destroyer was also part of the 7th Squadron in the battle of Cape Spartivento. On 15 June 1942, when the Italian fleet drove back the Allied convoy Vigorous from Alexandria, Freccia rescued survivors from the Italian cruiser Trento, sunk by the combined attack of torpedo bombers and the submarine HMS Umbra.

==== Convoy operations and loss ====
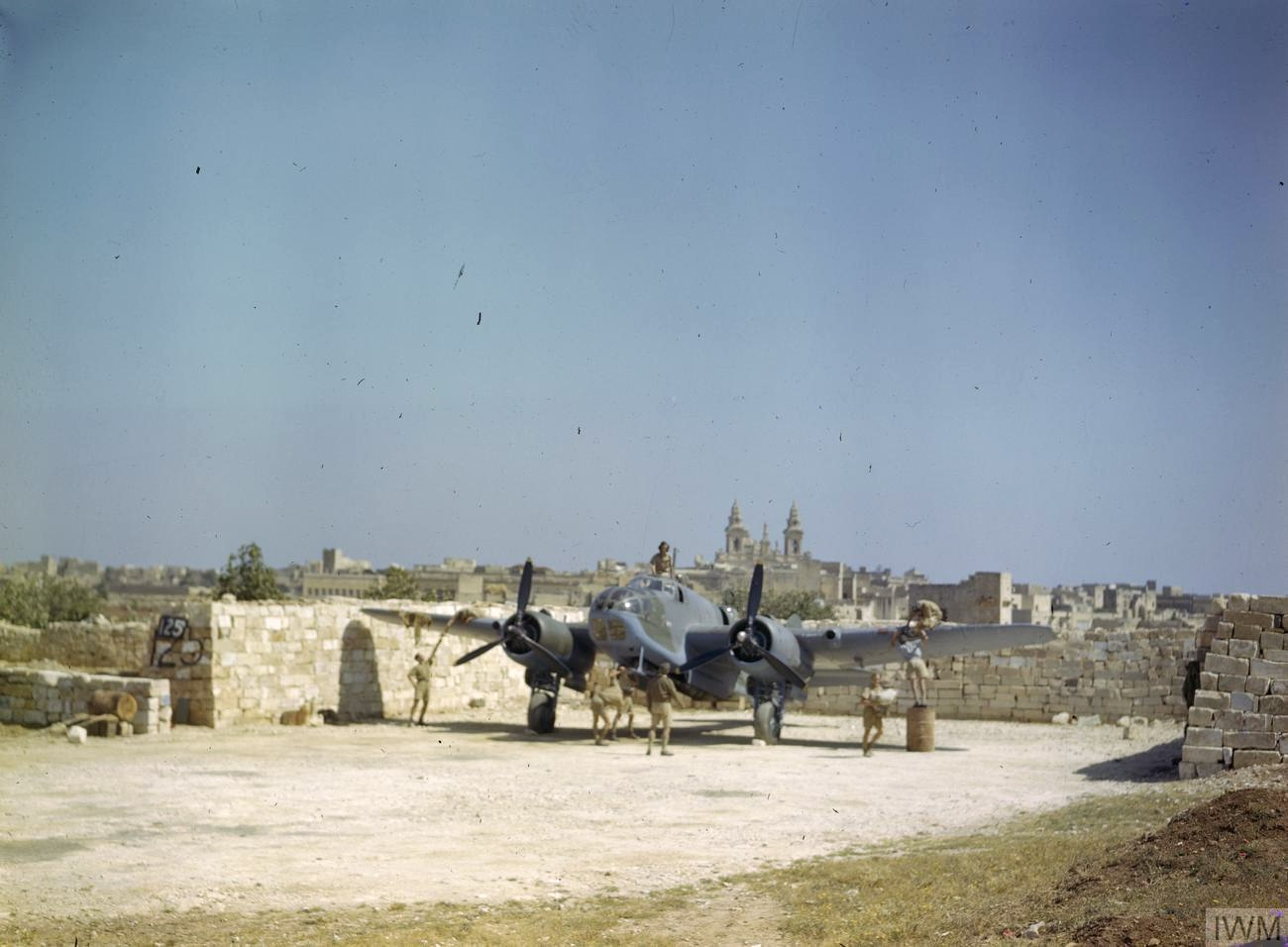
Bristol Beaufort from the 39 Sqn at Malta

Freccia was involved in several convoy actions in the course of the war. On 21 February 1941, Freccia led the escort of three Axis merchant ships on their way back from Tripoli, Libya. In the afternoon, the British submarine HMS Regent torpedoed the German freighter Menes, which was hit amidships. Regent endured an intense depth charge attack by the destroyers Turbine and Freccia and received some damage. Menes was eventually towed to safety by the third destroyer of the escort, Freccia's sister ship Saetta. On 11 December 1941, Freccia was escorting the transport Calitea when the Italian motor vessel was torpedoed and sunk by the British submarine HMS Talisman. Freccia counter-attacked Talisman with depth charges and rescued 230 survivors. On 28 July 1942, nine Beauforts torpedo bombers from the 39 Sqn departing from Malta launched a sortie against the Italian motor vessel Monviso, escorted by Freccia and the torpedo boat Calliope in a small convoy to Benghasi. The warships and the Axis fighter escort shot down two bombers, but Monviso was badly hit. Freccia towed the merchant ship to Navarino, where she was repaired, only to sink on a minefield some weeks later. On 6 September 1942, while escorting the motor vessels Luciano Manara and Ravello from Taranto to Benghasi along with the destroyers Bombardiere, Fuciliere, Geniere, Corsaro, Camicia Nera and the torpedo boat Pallade the convoy came under torpedo attack from Malta's Beauforts from the 39 Sqn. The Italian ships shot down two Beauforts and two supporting Beaufighters, not before one of the aerial torpedoes struck Luciano Manara's stern. Freccia took the motor vessel in tow, and beached her in Arillas bay, Corfu. Luciano Manara was eventually salvaged and survived the war. On 29 December 1942, Freccia, fitted by then with the radar warning system Metox, was lightly damaged when an aerial torpedo hit and blew up the ship she was escorting to Tunis, the transport Iseo, loaded with ammunition. After rescuing survivors, the destroyer was detached to reinforce the escort of a two-German merchant convoy. While undergoing modernisation works at Genoa, Freccia was bombed and sunk at dock by RAF Lancaster bombers during an area air raid on the city on 8 August 1943. Her hull was eventually refloated and scrapped in 1949.

== Bibliography ==
- Brescia, Maurizio (2012). Mussolini's Navy: A Reference Guide to the Regina Marina 1930–45. Annapolis, Maryland: Naval Institute Press. ISBN 978-1-59114-544-8.
- Fraccaroli, Aldo (1968). Italian Warships of World War II. Shepperton, UK: Ian Allan. ISBN 0-7110-0002-6.
- Giorgerini, Giorgio (2002). La guerra italiana sul mare: la marina tra vittoria e sconfitta, 1940-1943. (In Italian) Mondadori. ISBN 978-88-04-50150-3.
- Matessini, Francesco (2020) La battaglia di Capo Teulada (27-28 novembre 1940). (In Italian) Ufficio storico della Marina Militare.
- Matessini, Francesco (2000) La Guerra Civile Spagnola e la Regia Marina Italiana. (in Italian). Soldiershop Publishing. ISBN 8893276143.
- Roberts, John (1980). "Italy". In Chesneau, Roger (ed.). Conway's All the World's Fighting Ships 1922–1946. New York: Mayflower Books. pp. 280–317. ISBN 0-8317-0303-2.
- Rohwer, Jürgen (2005). Chronology of the War at Sea 1939–1945: The Naval History of World War Two (Third Revised ed.). Annapolis, Maryland: Naval Institute Press. ISBN 1-59114-119-2.
- Whitley, M. J. (1988). Destroyers of World War 2: An International Encyclopedia. Annapolis, Maryland: Naval Institute Press. ISBN 1-85409-521-8.
