= Operation Vigorous =

1942 failed Allied resupply convoy to Malta

- Part of the Battle of the Mediterranean of the Second World War
- Relief map of the Mediterranean Sea
Date	12–16 June 1942
Location	Eastern Mediterranean, towards Malta 35°53′N 14°30′E
Result	Italian–German victory

Belligerents
United Kingdom; Australia	Italy; Germany

Commanders and leaders
Philip Vian	Angelo Iachino

Strength
8 light cruisers; 26 destroyers; 9 submarines; 2 minesweepers; 4 corvettes; 2 rescue ships; 4 motor torpedo boats; 11 merchant ships; 1 auxiliary ship	2 battleships; 2 heavy cruisers; 2 light cruisers; 12 destroyers; 6 E-boats; 2 U-boats; c. 220 aircraft

Casualties and losses
1 light cruiser sunk; 3 destroyers sunk; 2 merchant ships sunk; 1 MTB foundered; 3 cruisers damaged; 2 merchant ships damaged; c. 200 killed (Note: 87 men killed on Hermione, 45 on Airedale, 13 on Hasty, 4 on HMAS Nestor, 1 on Newcastle, 46 on Aagtekerk, 6 on Bhutan)	1 heavy cruiser sunk; 1 battleship damaged; 21 aircraft shot down; c. 600 killed (Note: 570 men on Trento, 1 on Littorio, plus aircrew)

Operation Vigorous ( Italian: Battaglia di mezzo giugno 1942, "the Battle of mid-June") was a British operation during the Second World War, to escort supply Convoy MW 11 from the eastern Mediterranean to Malta, which took place from 11 to 16 June 1942. Vigorous was part of Operation Julius, a simultaneous operation with Operation Harpoon from Gibraltar and supporting operations. Sub-convoy MW 11c sailed from Port Said (Egypt) on 11 June, to tempt the Italian battlefleet to sail early, use up fuel and be exposed to submarine and air attack.

Convoy MW 11a and Convoy MW 11b sailed next day from Haifa, Port Said and Alexandria; one ship was sent back because of defects. Italian and German (Axis) aircraft attacked Convoy MW 11c on 12 June and a damaged ship was diverted to Tobruk, just east of Gazala. The merchant ships and escorts rendezvoused on 13 June. The British plans were revealed unwittingly to the Axis by the US Military Attaché in Egypt, Colonel Bonner Fellers, who reported to Washington, D.C. in "Black"-coded wireless messages; it was later discovered that the Black Code had been broken by the Servizio Informazioni Militare (Italian military intelligence).

The convoy and escorts sailed through "Bomb Alley" between Crete and Cyrenaica under attack from Axis bombers, dive-bombers, torpedo-bombers, E-boats and submarines and were then threatened by the sailing of the Italian battlefleet from Taranto. The British relied on aircraft and submarines to repel the Italian fleet but only one heavy cruiser was sunk. When the Italian battleships were within 150 nmi (170 mi; 280 km) the British convoy and escorts turned back while the Italians suffered losses from torpedo-bombers, bombers and submarines but little more damage was inflicted and after several more turns towards and away from Malta, the convoy and escorts returned to Alexandria on 16 June. The Eighth Army lost the Battle of Gazala (26 May – 21 June) and abandoned landing grounds that air cover for Convoy MW 11 came from.

Operation Julius and Operation Vigorous failed, only two merchant ships from Harpoon reaching Malta. Without air cover, the central Mediterranean was closed to the British. Malta could not be revived as an offensive base and the British resorted submarines to deliver aviation fuel. No convoys ran from the eastern Mediterranean until Libya was re-conquered. More Spitfires were delivered to Malta in July and losses reduced the tempo of operations by the Luftwaffe and Regia Aeronautica. Offensive operations against Axis convoys to Libya began and Operation Pedestal in August delivered four merchant ships and an oil tanker from Gibraltar, further reviving Malta as an offensive base.

== Background ==
=== Malta ===
==== Siege, 1942 ====
Axis bombing smashed the docks, ships, aircraft and airfields by the end of April 1942 and then the bombing was switched to targets preliminary to invasion: camps, barracks, warehouses and road junctions. After 18 April, German bombing suddenly stopped and Italian bombers took over, regularly bombing with small formations of aircraft. During the month, Axis aircraft flew more than 9,500 sorties against 388 British, all but 30 being fighter sorties. The British had lost 50 aircraft, 20 shot down in combat against 37 Axis losses during the dropping of 6,700 long tons (6,800 t) of bombs, three times the March figure, 3,000 long tons (3,000 t) on the docks, 2,600 long tons (2,600 t) on airfields. The bombing demolished or damaged 11,450 buildings, 300 civilians were killed and 350 seriously wounded; good shelters existed but some casualties were caused by delayed-action bombs. Rations of meat, fats and sugar were cut further and on 5 May, the bread ration was cut to 10.5 oz (300 g) per day, enough to last until late July; pasta rations had already been stopped and there had been a poor winter potato harvest.

Three destroyers, three submarines, three minesweepers, five tugs, a water carrier and a floating crane were sunk in port and more ships damaged. The island continued to function as a staging post but the Axis bombing campaign neutralised Malta as an offensive base. Two boats of the 10th Submarine Flotilla had been sunk, two were damaged in harbour and on 26 April the flotilla was ordered out because of mining by small fast craft, which were undetectable by radar and inaudible during the bombing; the surviving minesweepers were too reduced in numbers to clear the approaches. Three reconnaissance aircraft remained and only 22 bomber sorties were flown, eleven more by FAA aircraft during the month and by the start of June, only two Fairey Albacores and two Fairey Swordfish were left.

==== Offensive operations ====
Libya location map

From December 1941, Luftwaffe bombing neutralised Malta, British decrypts of Italian C 38m cipher messages showed more sailings and fewer losses and on 23 February 1942, an Italian "battleship convoy" reached Tripoli. By the end of February, 11 ships had crossed without escort and an intelligence blackout caused by a change to the C 38m machine in early March made little difference to the British for lack of means. After the British broke C 38m again, 26 Axis supply journeys had been made by May, only nine being spotted by air reconnaissance. On 14 April, five Malta aircraft were shot down and the submarine HMS Upholder was lost. On 10 March, the cruiser HMS Naiad was sunk by a U-boat and on 10 May, three of four destroyers were sunk by the Luftwaffe. In February and March, Axis losses were 9 per cent of supplies, those sent in April less than one per cent and May losses were 7 per cent.

The Axis was able to reinforce North Africa sufficient for Rommel to try to attack before the British. In late April, the British Chiefs of Staff ruled that there would be no convoy to Malta in May, because the Italian fleet could be expected to sail and the convoy would need battleship and aircraft carrier cover, which was not available. An operation to fly Spitfires to Malta succeeded and anti-aircraft ammunition was to be supplied by fast minelayer, with which Malta would have to hold on until mid-June, when the situation in the Western Desert might be clearer. Should Martuba or Benghazi in Cyrenaica be captured by the Eighth Army, a westbound convoy from Alexandria might survive without cover from battleships and aircraft carriers. It would also be known if Luftwaffe aircraft had been diverted to the Russian Front and if the crisis in the Indian Ocean had abated, sufficient for ships to escort a fast convoy from Alexandria.

==== Unternehmen Herkules ====
Operation Hercules (Operazione C3) was an Axis plan to invade Malta and during 1942, reinforcement of the Luftwaffe in Sicily and the bombing campaign against the island led to speculation that it was the prelude to invasion. Gleanings from prisoners of war and diplomatic sources led to a certain apprehension about the meaning of troop movements in southern Italy. The absence of evidence from signals intelligence and air reconnaissance led to a conclusion that an invasion was not imminent but the need to protect the source of information meant that this was not disclosed by the British. That preparations were being made was revealed on 7 February through the decryption of Luftwaffe Enigma messages but by 23 March the scare died down and more bombing was expected. By 31 March the progress of the Axis bombing campaign led to a prediction that the attempt would be made in April but this was soon discounted.

Although the bombing offensive increased from 750 long tons (760 t) in February, to 2,000 long tons (2,000 t) in March, 5,500 long tons (5,600 t) in April, Enigma decodes showed that there were still 425 Luftwaffe aircraft in Sicily, not the 650 aircraft originally intended, because aircraft were detained in Russia by the Soviet winter offensive and on 26 April, Enigma revealed that Fliegerkorps II was being withdrawn. By 2 May, a Luftwaffe bomber group and a fighter group had been withdrawn with more to follow, which explained the lull. Hitler was lukewarm about the operation, in case the Italian navy left down German airborne forces but the capture of Tobruk in mid-June made it appear that the invasion was unnecessary. Hitler and Mussolini agreed to Panzerarmee Afrika pursuing the British into Egypt for the rest of June and into July, which meant cancelling Hercules.

=== Western Desert Campaign ===
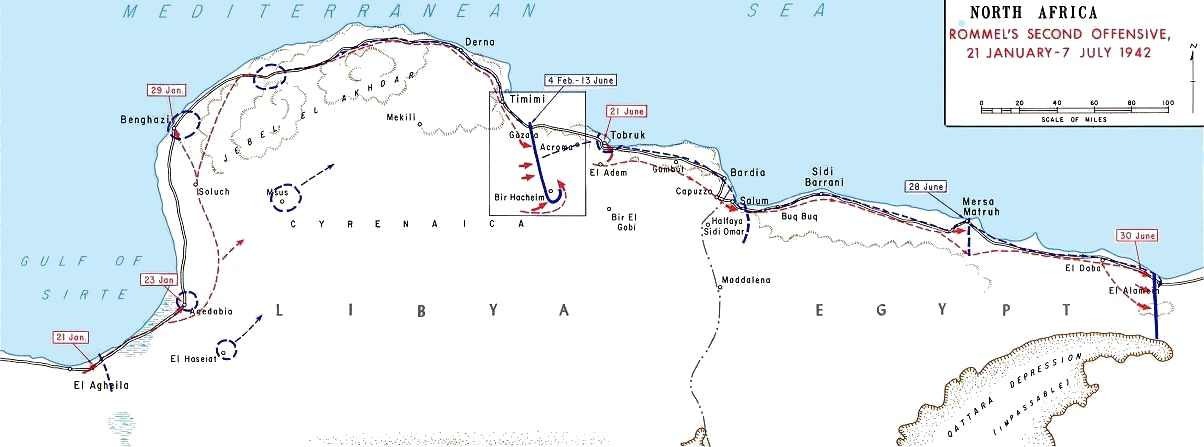
Course of the desert war, showing the British loss of Libyan and Egyptian airfields after the Battle of Gazala

After the success of Operation Crusader (18 November – 30 December 1941), the Eighth Army advanced 500 mi (800 km) west to El Agheila in Libya, capturing airfields and landing grounds useful for air cover for Malta convoys. The British misjudged the speed of Axis reinforcement and expected to attack well before the Axis but Panzerarmee Afrika forestalled the Eighth Army by beginning an offensive on 21 January 1942.

By 6 February, the British had been defeated, forced to retreat east of the Jebel Akhdar back to the Gazala line. The new front line was just west of Tobruk, where Panzerarmee had begun its retirement seven weeks earlier. At the Battle of Gazala (26 May – 21 June), Panzerarmee Afrika attacked first again but appeared close to defeat until 11 June. Operation Julius began on the same day as the Afrika Korps broke out and by 14 June, forced the British to retreat towards Tobruk. The Axis then forces pursued the British into Egypt and the Desert Air Force lost the Libyan landing grounds from which to cover Malta convoys.

== Prelude ==
=== Operation Julius ===
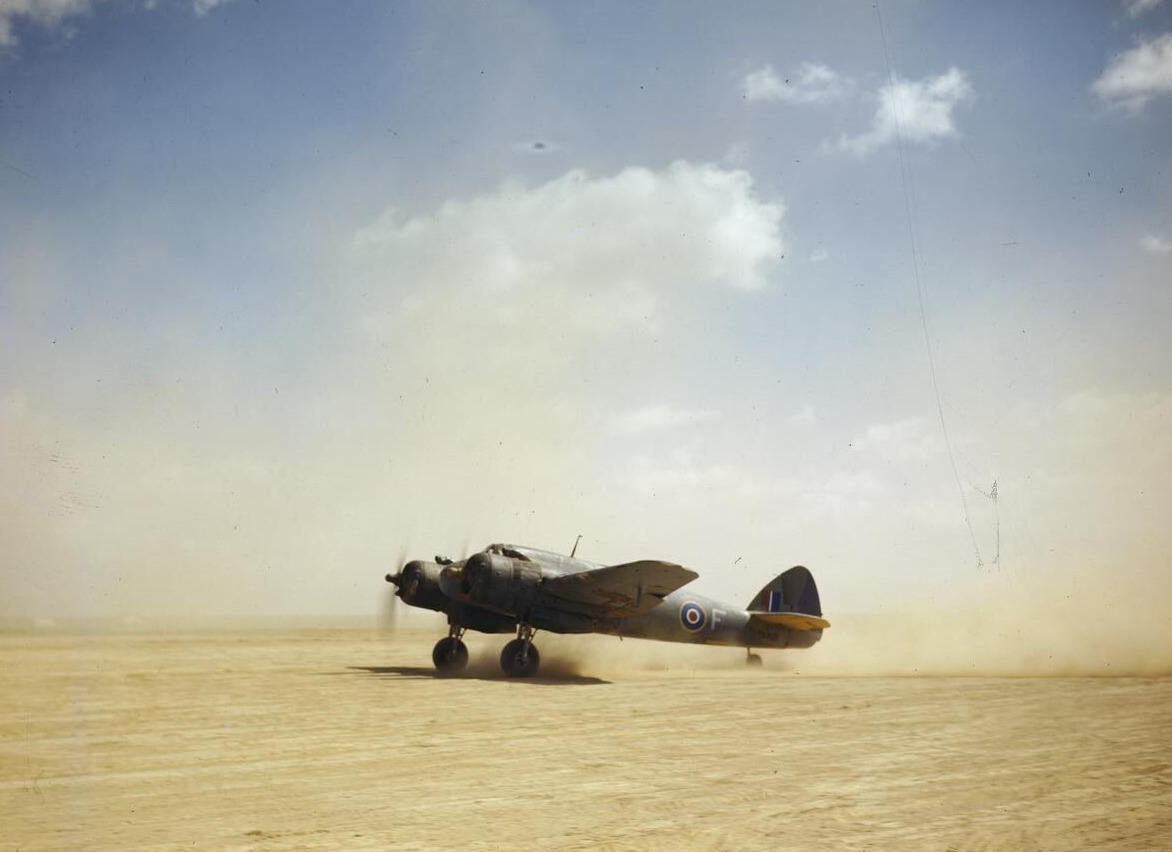
Bristol Beaufighter Mk 1, 252 Squadron; North Africa

Two weeks before the convoys, the carrier HMS Eagle began operations to deliver 63 Spitfires to Malta, which increased the number to 95 serviceable fighters. Air operations for the two convoys began on 24 May, when Vickers Wellington bombers of 104 Squadron from Malta, began bombing airfields and ports in Sicily and southern Italy. On 11 June, the Wellingtons were withdrawn to accommodate six Wellington torpedo bombers of 38 Squadron, Bristol Beaufort torpedo-bombers of 217 Squadron and Martin Baltimore reconnaissance aircraft of 69 Squadron. Aircraft from Gibraltar, Malta and Egypt also began reconnaissance flights on 11 June, searching for the Italian fleet.

Twelve Beauforts of 39 Squadron at Bir Amud in Egypt, five B-24 Liberator bombers of 160 Squadron and about 24 aircraft of the Halverson Detachment United States Army Air Forces (USAAF) at RAF Fayid, were also made available. Short-range fighters based in Palestine, Egypt, Cyrenaica and Malta, were to provide air cover at first and as the convoy moved out of range, protection would be taken over by Kittyhawks of 250 Squadron with long-range fuel tanks, Beaufighters from 252 Squadron and 272 Squadron and Beaufighter night fighters from 227 Squadron. Air cover from Cyrenaica could not overlap with coverage from Malta leaving a gap but Wellingtons of 205 Group and the light bombers of the Desert Air Force would attack Axis airfields in North Africa. The coastal 201 Group would provide reconnaissance and anti-submarine sorties and a small sabotage party was to land on Crete to attack Axis aircraft on the ground.

==== Operation Vigorous ====
Vigorous was planned as a joint Royal Navy–RAF operation, to be conducted from the headquarters of 201 Naval Co-operation Group by Admiral Henry Harwood and Air Marshal Arthur Tedder, with Rear Admiral Philip Vian in command of the convoy and escorts (Force A). On 22 March 1942, in Operation MG 1 protecting Convoy MW 10 to Malta, the Second Battle of Sirte between the Italian fleet and the British escorts had been fought. The British escorts had held off the Italian fleet for 2 1/2 hours but in the longer days of June, it was doubted that the feat could be repeated. If a larger Italian force attacked the convoy, Vian was to protect the convoy with smoke and the escorts were to repulse the attackers with torpedoes and try to inflict early casualties using gunfire against two of the Italian ships. The success of the convoy would depend on the Italian fleet being damaged by air and submarine attack before it could close on the ships, rather than on surface action because the battleships HMS Queen Elizabeth and Valiant were still out of action.

Bringing the battleship HMS Warspite and several aircraft carriers from the Eastern Fleet to reinforce the Mediterranean Fleet was considered but the danger of air attack was so great that it was rejected. The convoy and escort force was larger than the effort in March, with Force A, the Dido-class cruiser HMS Cleopatra as flagship and the cruisers HMS Dido, HMS Euryalus of the 15th Cruiser Squadron and HMS Hermione from the Eastern Fleet, provided the convoy escort with four 5.25-inch light cruisers and the C-class anti-aircraft cruiser HMS Coventry. The Eastern Fleet sent the 6-inch Town-class cruiser cruisers HMS Newcastle, HMS Birmingham and HMS Arethusa of the 4th Cruiser Squadron. The operation was to have 26 destroyers, ten from the Eastern Fleet, four corvettes, two minesweepers to clear the Malta approaches, four Motor Torpedo Boats (MTB) and two rescue ships. The former battleship HMS Centurion, which had been disarmed between the wars and used for training, was fitted with anti-aircraft guns and pressed into service to masquerade as an operational battleship. The 1st Submarine and 10th Submarine Flotilla were to send nine boats as a moving screen parallel to the convoy as it passed between Crete and Cyrenaica (Bomb Alley). On the days before and after, the submarines were to patrol areas that the Italian fleet was likely to be found.

==== Operation Harpoon ====
Operation Harpoon, the Operation Julius convoy eastbound from Gibraltar began on 4 June, with the departure from Scotland of five merchant ships as Convoy WS 19z. It had been being given out that the ships were bound for Malta via the Cape but the deception was exposed when Troilus was ordered to assume a short voyage; the naval liaison officer, five signals staff and Navy gunners on board each merchant ship also left little to the imagination. With the cruisers HMS Kenya, HMS Liverpool and ten destroyers, the convoy passed through the Straits of Gibraltar on the night of 11/12 June and became Convoy GM4, to be joined by an oil tanker and its escorts. Force H consisted of a battleship, two aircraft carriers, three cruisers and eight destroyers. The close escort was provided by an anti-aircraft cruiser, nine destroyers, six Motor Gun Boats (MGB) and small craft. HMS Welshman was to accompany the ships and then dash for Malta at 28 kn (52 km/h; 32 mph), with ammunition for the aircraft on Malta. Off the Italian coast, 13 submarines were to patrol, ready to ambush Italian ships.

=== Regia Marina ===
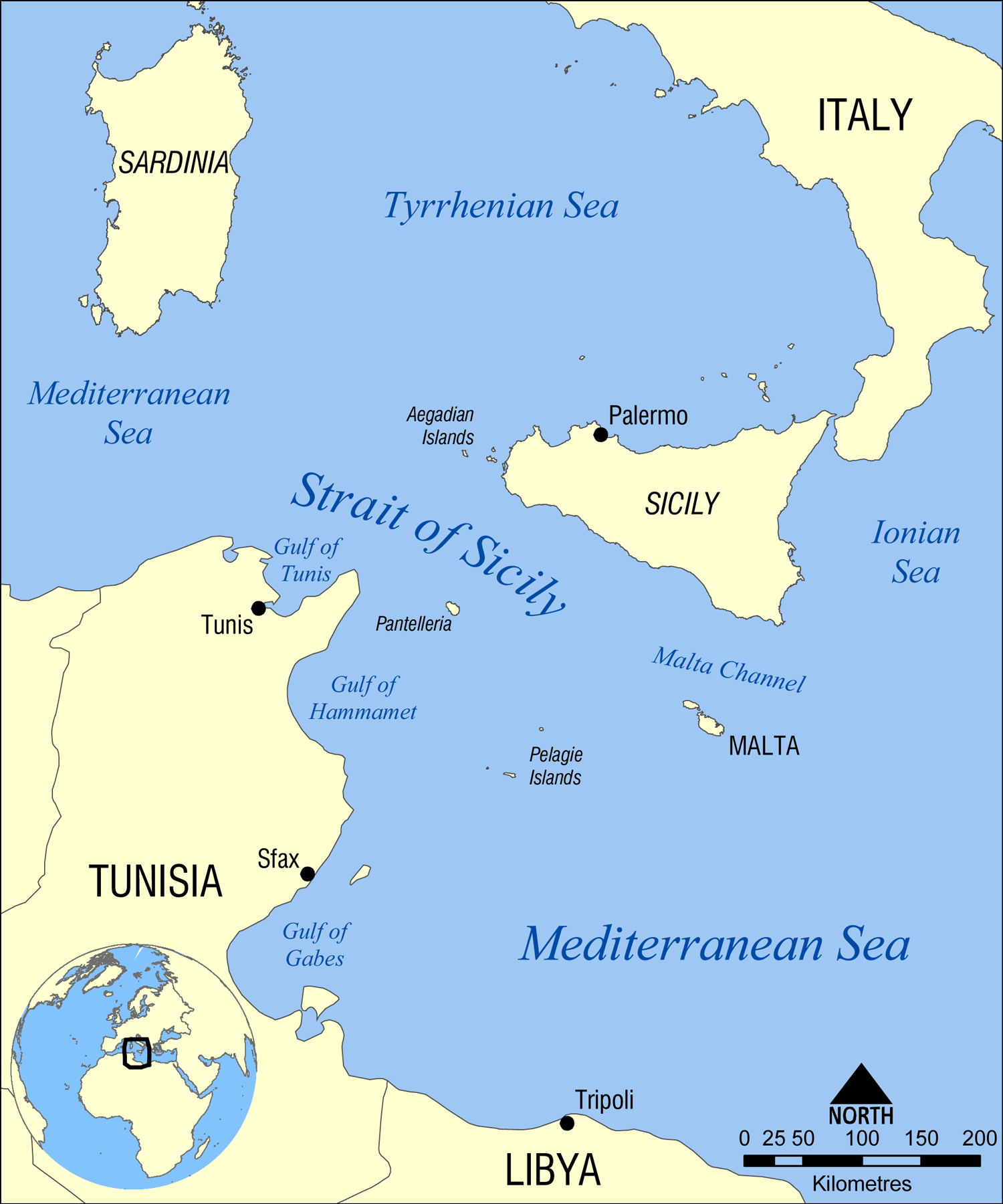
Map of the central Mediterranean

A shortage of oil limited Italian naval operations but the accumulation of ships at Alexandria and decrypted wireless messages from Colonel Bonner Fellers, the US Military attaché in Cairo (die gute Quelle, the good source), alerted the Regia Marina that convoys were about to be run from Alexandria and Gibraltar to Malta. Supermarina the navy high command, planned a counter-operation against both convoys and nine submarines were sent to patrol off the Algerian coast, five between Lampedusa and Malta and five east of Malta in the Ionian Sea.

Two Italian MAS-boats and six E-boats lay in ambush between Crete and Cyrenaica and the 7th Cruiser Division (it:Ammiraglio di divisione [Vice-Admiral] Alberto Da Zara) with Raimondo Montecuccoli and Eugenio di Savoia in Palermo and the destroyers Ascari, Alfredo Oriani, Lanzerotto Malocello, Premuda and Vivaldi in Cagliari waited for Harpoon, along with MAS-boats and a large number of aircraft to operate in the western basin of the Mediterranean. The main Italian battlefleet was reserved for the eastbound convoy from Alexandria.

== Convoy ==
=== Operation Rembrandt, 11 June ===
To camouflage preparations, the eleven merchantmen were loaded at Alexandria, Port Said, Suez, Haifa and Beirut, rendezvousing at Port Said and Haifa. Secrecy led to a lack of practice for the military passengers who made up damage control and fire-fighting parties and some defects in the ships' guns went unnoticed. The Port Said ships Aagtekirk, Bhutan, City of Calcutta and Rembrandt of Convoy MW 11c, sailed 36 hours early in the afternoon of 11 June, in Operation Rembrandt, each towing an MTB. Escorted by Coventry and eight Hunt-class destroyers, Convoy MW 11c was to simulate the Malta convoy and steam about as far as the Tobruk meridian and turn back to rendezvous with the remainder. It was hoped that the decoy operation would lure out the Italian fleet, expose itself to attack and run short of fuel before the main convoy sailed. During the night five of the freighters for Operation Harpoon rendezvoused with the tanker Kentucky off Gibraltar; by morning Convoy GM 4 was making 12–13 kn (22–24 km/h; 14–15 mph) to the east.

=== 12 June ===
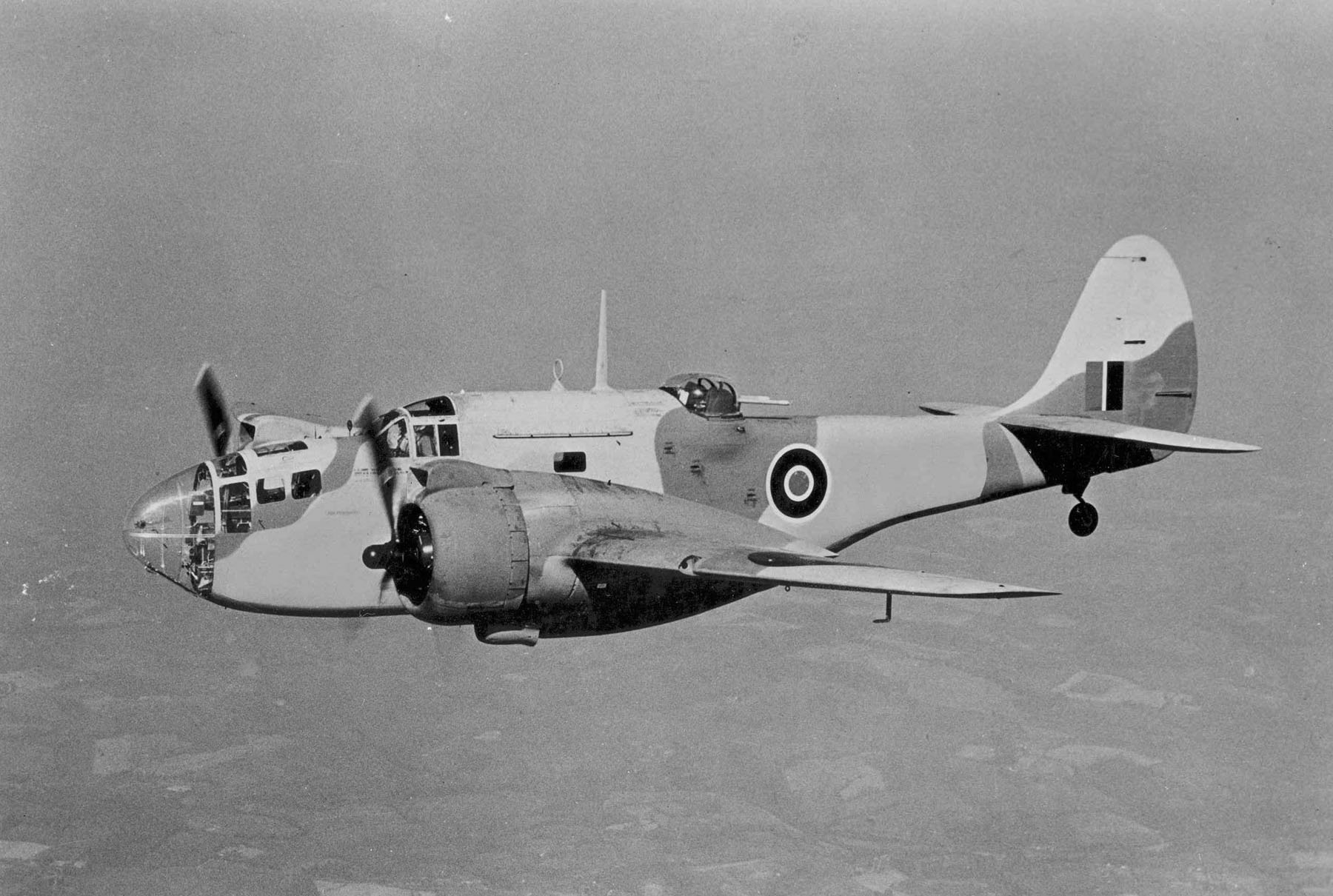
RAF Martin Baltimore

Convoy MW 11a of Ajax, City of Edinburgh, City of Pretoria, City of Lincoln and Elizabeth Bakke sailed from Haifa and Port Said on 12 June, escorted by the 7th Destroyer Flotilla of Napier, Norman, Nizam, Inconstant and Hotspur, with fleet minesweepers Boston and Seaham. Elizabeth Bakke was ordered into port from Convoy MW 11a, escorted by Zulu due to overloading and a fouled hull, that stopped the ship keeping direction or reaching the convoy speed of 13 kn (24 km/h; 15 mph). Convoy MW 11b sailed from Alexandria with Potaro, the tanker Bulkoil, the decommissioned battleship Centurion, carrying supplies and operating as a decoy, the rescue ships Malines and Antwerp, escorted by five destroyers and four corvettes. During the evening, Convoy MW 11c was attacked from Crete by 15 Ju 88 bombers of I Kampfgeschwader 54 and City of Calcutta was damaged by a near-miss. The ship stopped and took on a list but got under way at 11 kn (20 km/h; 13 mph) to be ordered at 11:00 p.m. to divert to Tobruk with its towed MTB, escorted by Exmoor and Croome. During the short night, Convoy MW 11c turned back to rendezvous off Alexandria with the rest of Convoy MW 11 the next day and the Hunts put in to refuel. Operation Harpoon was undisturbed because Supermarina suspected that it was a decoy.

=== 13 June ===
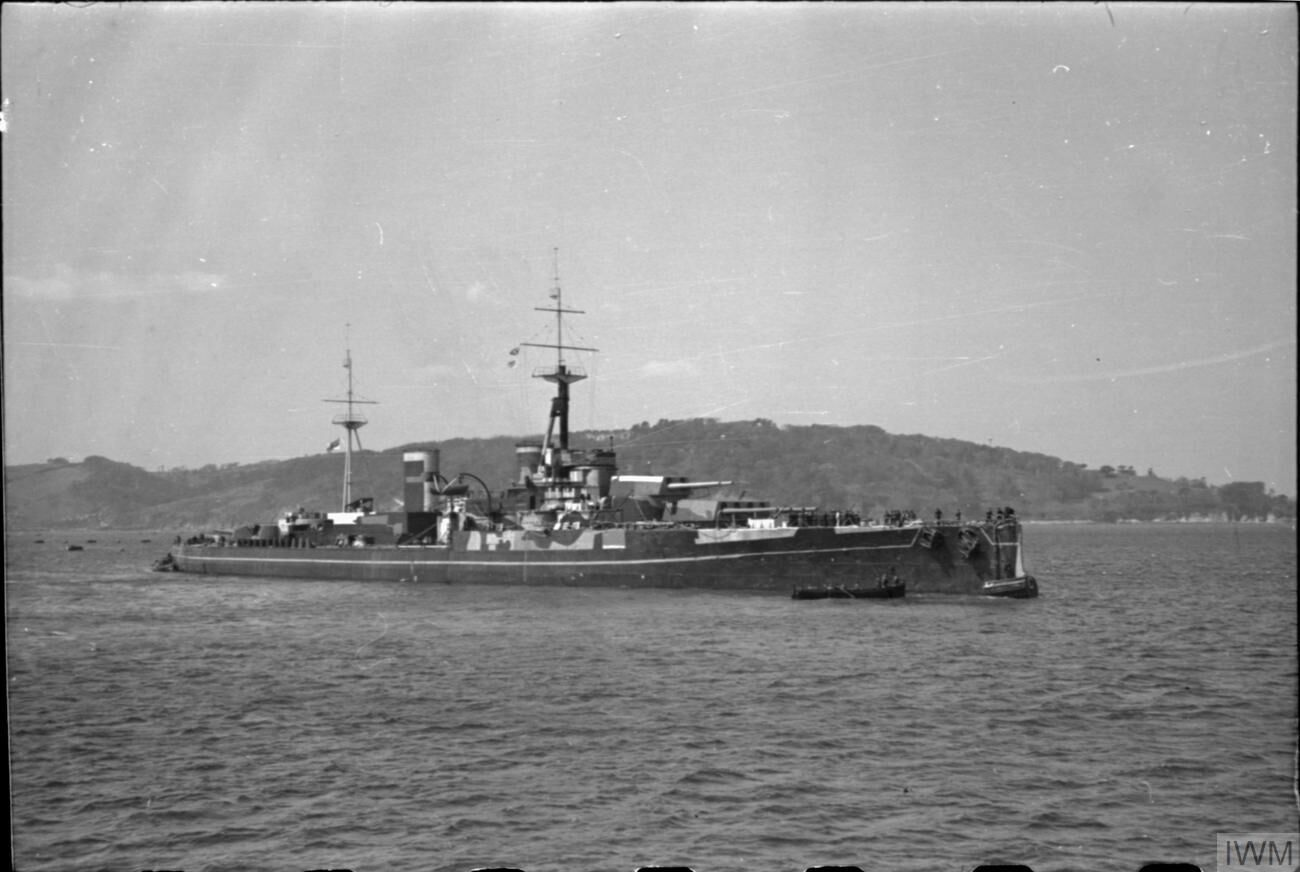
HMS Centurion disguised as HMS Anson (A9982)

The three convoy elements met off Mersa Matruh during the afternoon and made for Malta as the 7th Destroyer Flotilla put into Alexandria to refuel, the rest of the destroyers sailing on and the rest leaving Alexandria with the main force, seven cruisers and their destroyer screen. During the afternoon, the weather deteriorated and the MTBs on tow were cast off to return to Alexandria but MTB 259 was damaged and sunk, the rest made port the next day. During the night a five-man raiding party was landed by submarine on Crete and damaged or destroyed about 20 aircraft of Lehrgeschwader 1 at Maleme airfield. The activity of raiding parties was reported to Washington by Bonner Fellers; three SBS parties had landed the week previous, one to attack the aircraft but had not been able to penetrate the airfield security.

After dark, Axis aircraft continuously illuminated the convoy with flares and dropped occasional bombs, then at 4:30 a.m. the Luftwaffe attacked the main escort force catching up from the east, dropping more bombs and flares until British fighters arrived after dawn. Douglas Bostons and Wellington bombers attacked Axis airfields near Derna and other places during the night, to interfere with Axis air operations against the convoy. At the Gazala position in Libya, the British tanks had been defeated in the fighting from 11 to 13 June and the Eighth Army was ordered to retreat the next day. Operation Harpoon continued and more aircraft of the Regia Aeronautica were transferred to Sardinia but lost contact with the convoy. Two Italian cruisers and three destroyers departed Cagliari during the evening for Palermo, ready to stop a fast ship from dashing to Malta.

=== 14 June ===
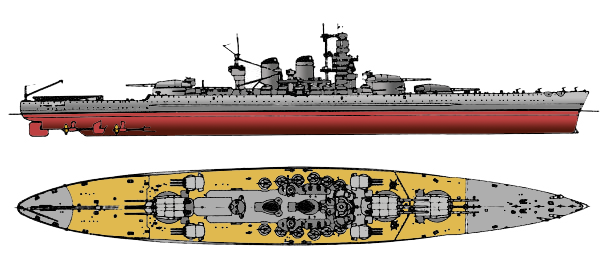
Line-drawing of the Littorio class battleships

Dust storms in Libya grounded day bombers until the evening and most of the aircraft based in Libya that operated over Vigorous. The convoy escorts reorganised, the four corvettes, two minesweepers and the 5th Destroyer Flotilla with nine destroyers being joined by 17 fleet destroyers of the 2nd, 7th, 12th, 14th and 22nd flotillas. Aagtekirk, Erica and Primula developed engine-trouble, Erica was sent to Mersa Matruh and the other two to Tobruk, escorted by Tetcott. At 12:20 p.m., about 12 nmi (22 km; 14 mi) off Tobruk, the ships were attacked and Primula was shaken by near misses. About forty Junkers Ju 87 Stuka dive-bombers and Junkers Ju 88 medium bombers bombed Tetcott and the rest attacked Aagtekirk, which was hit and caught fire as three bombers were shot down. Ships and boats were sent from Tobruk but could only pick up survivors by 2:30 p.m. and the ship ran aground and burned out. The rest of the convoy was covered by Hurricanes and Kittyhawks diverted from the Battle of Gazala, which protected the convoy from a big force of bombers.

During the afternoon Lehrgeschwader 1 was more circumspect until the convoy was beyond the cover of the short-range British fighters, then from 4:30 a.m., 60–70 bombers made seven attacks in five hours, opposed by a few long-range Kittyhawks and Beaufighters. The eight merchantmen were in four columns around the rescue ships, with the cruisers about 1,200 yd (1,100 m) out, the Hunt class destroyers 1 nmi (1.9 km; 1.2 mi) beyond and the fleet destroyers on anti-submarine patrol 2,500 yd (2,300 m) outside the Hunts. The formation was effective against torpedo-bombers but risked attack by dive-bombers in the absence of British fighters. The Germans attacked from 10,000 ft (3,000 m) from the rear or sides in groups of 10–12 aircraft, dividing into twos and threes to bomb. At 5:30 p.m. about 20 aircraft attacked Bulkoil and Bhutan from the flank and near-missed Bulkoil and Potaro which took on water. Bhutan was hit three times and sank at 6:05 p.m.; 153 crew and passengers were picked up by the rescue ships and a destroyer but 16 men were lost. (Note: The crews of the rescue ships had been trained to use "recovery lines, scrambling nets, rafts and lifebuoys as net-men, inhaul parties, boats' crews, mooring parties" and to use specialist facilities for people covered in oil.) After the rescue, Antwerp and Malines were directed to Tobruk where the serious cases were transferred to a hospital ship and then they sailed for Alexandria, Tobruk being under artillery bombardment by Axis guns, arriving at 9:15 p.m. next day.

Two hours after Bhutan sank, the periscope of U-77 was seen as the German submarine attacked Pakenham in the outer screen. The torpedo missed but the attack on the submarine was cancelled, when torpedo boats were seen to the north-west. British fighters were ordered to engage but were bounced by Bf 109s escorting the E-boats. The worst of the bombing stopped once dark fell and desultory bombing and flare dropping resumed. The escort force moved into night formation, the fleet destroyers in line ahead of the convoy, two cruisers and four destroyers on the port and starboard quarters and a destroyer at each corner of the formation 5 nmi (9.3 km; 5.8 mi) out. The flare-dropping deterred the E-boats from coming too close but the convoy and escort crews were very tired and much of the anti-aircraft ammunition of the convoy and escorts had been expended.

At 6:45 p.m. a Baltimore crew flying from Malta had caught sight of the Italian fleet and gave a strength report of four cruisers with four destroyers, preceding two battleships and four destroyers, which reached Harwood at 10:30 p.m. A Photographic Reconnaissance (PR) flight over Taranto had verified the departure of the ships at 8:00 p.m. and another sighting reached Harwood that at 2:24 a.m. the fleet was making 20 kn (37 km/h; 23 mph) southwards. At 11:15 p.m. Harwood signalled Vian that the Italian fleet (Admiral Angelo Iachino) with two battleships, two heavy and two light cruisers and 12 destroyers had sailed from Taranto and would reach the convoy by 7:00 a.m. (Note: The Italian destroyer Legionario was the first Italian ship to carry a German De.Te search radar.) Vian requested permission to turn back as it would be impossible for the escorts to protect the merchantmen for another long summer day. Harwood ordered Vigorous to continue towards Malta until 2:00 a.m. on 15 June, then turn onto a reciprocal course. At Gazala, the Eighth Army began to withdraw after it had been defeated in the fighting from 11 to 13 June, leaving a garrison inside Tobruk; both sides sent aircraft to Vigorous, which gave a respite to the armies. Harpoon came into range of the 20 Italian bombers and 50 torpedo-bombers based in Sardinia. Fighter-bombers attacked first, then bombers and torpedo-bombers at the same time which sank a merchant ship and damaged a cruiser. As the convoy came within range of Sicily, ten Luftwaffe Ju 88s joined in but the early attacks were defeated, seven British and 17 Axis aircraft being lost.

=== Night, 14/15 June ===
The turn order was given at 1:45 a.m., a hazardous manoeuvre for a large group of ships out of position, full of tired crews and menaced by Axis torpedo-boats and U-boats. As the turn was made the cruisers fell back and were attacked by the 3rd Schnellbootflottille (Leutnant-zur-See Siegfried Wuppermann); S 56 fired first at 3:50 a.m. and hit Newcastle with one torpedo head on, which was screened by destroyers as damage-control parties worked on the damage and Newcastle soon worked back up to 24 kn (44 km/h; 28 mph) The destroyer HMS Hasty was hit by S 55 at 5:25 a.m., 12 men were killed and the ship was so badly damaged that it was sunk by Hotspur. As the sun rose, Convoy MW 11 was heading east and at 3:40 a.m. four Wellington torpedo-bombers from Malta found the Italian fleet, dropped flares and attacked but the ships made smoke and only one Wellington dropped torpedoes. At the same time, nine 217 Squadron Beauforts took off from Malta, reached the Italians as dawn broke and the first three Beauforts attacked Trento at 6:10 a.m., achieving one torpedo hit, as two bombers pressed on through the destroyer and cruiser screen. Trento came to a standstill after it was struck amidships at 5:15 a.m. Force W, covering Operation Harpoon, turned back during the night and the convoy proceeded with the close escorts of Force X. The Italian cruisers and seven destroyers at Palermo sailed at dusk.

=== 15 June ===
==== Morning ====
The British torpedo attack came when the Italian battlefleet was passing through the area of the 10th Submarine Flotilla, after the plan to form a line north of the track of the convoy had been overtaken by events after the Italian battleships sailed and the convoy turned back. HMS Umbra (Lieutenant S. L. C. Maydon) picked up the Italian ships on hydrophone and steered towards the fleet as the torpedo-bombers dropped illumination flares. Maydon found that Umbra was

...in the unenviable position of being in the centre of a fantastic circus of wildly careering capital ships, cruisers and destroyers...of tracer-shell streaks and anti-aircraft bursts...there was not a quadrant of the compass unoccupied by enemy vessels weaving to and fro....[yet] It was essential to remain at periscope depth, for an opportunity to fire might come at any moment.

— Maydon

Trento was circled by the battleships, which then resumed their southward course, leaving it behind with the destroyer Antonio Pigafetta; at 6:46 a.m. Maydon fired torpedoes at Italian battleship Vittorio Veneto, with no hits. The Italian ships had also been seen at 6:15 a.m. by HMS Ultimatum (Lieutenant P. R. H. Harrison), the heavy cruisers to the west of the battleships and at 6:22 a.m. Ultimatum attacked through the destroyer screen, only to be frustrated by the cruisers zig-zagging and passing overhead. HMS Uproar (Lieutenant J. B. de B. Kershaw) briefly sighted the battlefleet but was too far away to attack. HMS Thrasher, HMS Taku and HMS Thorn (Lieutenant-Commander R. G. Norfolk) received the sighting report and surfaced to overhaul the ships but only Thorn at 7:00 a.m. caught sight of them out of range. Umbra, Uproar and Ultimatum turned towards the immobilised Trento and at 10:06 a.m. Umbra hit Trento with two torpedoes, the ship sinking an hour later.

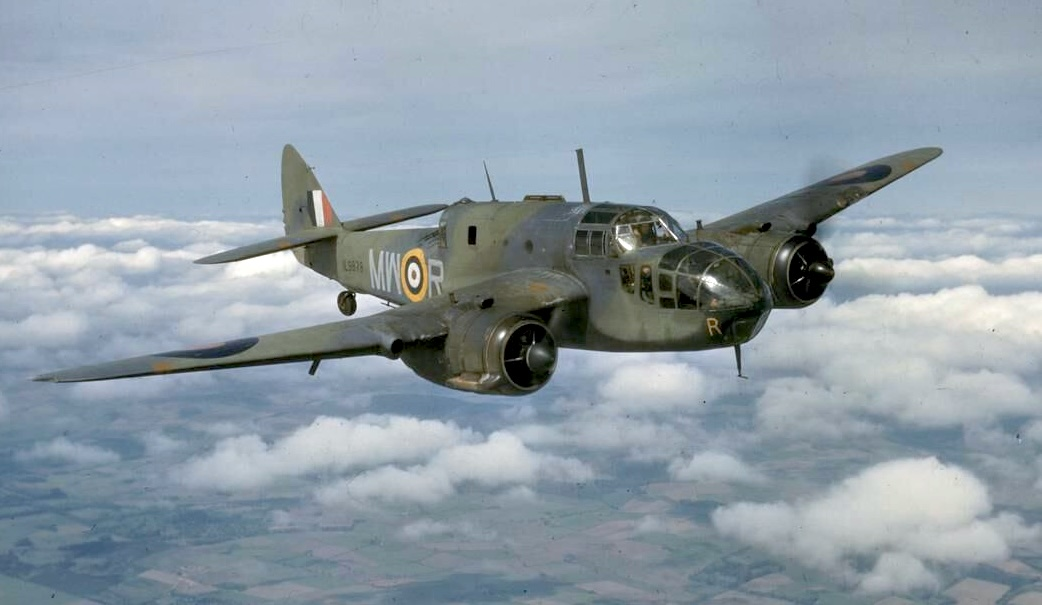
Example of a Beaufort torpedo bomber

The battlefleet continued south in two groups and eight US and one British B-24 bomber attacked at 9:00 a.m. from 14,000 ft (4,300 m) and accurately bombed, hitting Littorio with a 500 lb (230 kg)-bomb with little effect. As the B-24s turned away, five 39 Squadron Beauforts from Bir Amud arrived at low level, having set off at 6:25 a.m. to synchronise their attack with the B-24s, minus their Beaufighter escort, which had been diverted to the ground battle. Bf 109s and MC 202s based near Gazala intercepted the 12 Beauforts, shot down two and damaged five, which turned back (one failing to return). Near the Italian battlefleet, two more Beauforts were damaged by long-range anti-aircraft fire at about 9:40 a.m. but by turning broadside to bring more guns to bear, the Italian ships presented bigger targets, the Beaufort crews claiming a hit on a battleship and the US crews above reporting hits on a cruiser and a destroyer, although all torpedoes missed; the Beauforts turned for Malta and landed at Luqa, the damaged leader crash-landing.

The combined HQ at Alexandria received reports only after long delays and during the night, Harwood became more apprehensive that the convoy would soon sail back into Bomb Alley and ordered another turn at 7:00 a.m. Vian was then ordered to avoid the Italians until aircraft had attacked around 10:30 a.m. If the attack failed, Vian was to get the convoy to Malta and if the Italian ships intercepted, the merchant ships were to be abandoned to their fate, the escorts escaping in any direction. At 8:30 a.m., reconnaissance reports showed that the battlefleet was still making south, 150 nmi (170 mi; 280 km) from the convoy and at 9:40 a.m., Harwood ordered the ships to reverse course again. It was only at 11:15 a.m. that Harwood and Tedder discovered that aircraft from Malta had engaged the Italian battlefleet and received the exaggerated claims of torpedo hits, including those on the battleships. Harwood signalled that Convoy MW 11 should turn for Malta again, the escorts to abandon the freighters if challenged and then at 12:45 p.m. delegated freedom of action to Vian. At dawn, the ships of Operation Harpoon were intercepted by an Italian cruiser force and the five British fleet destroyers boldly attacked as the smaller destroyers remained with the convoy and eventually the Italian ships broke off the attack at 10:00 a.m. Air attacks on the convoy had continued, two ships were damaged and one sunk. The Italian cruisers reappeared, fired on a previously disabled destroyer, which had been taken in tow by an escort destroyer; the crippled ship was left adrift, and eventually torpedoed and sunk by an aircraft. The damaged merchant ships were scuttled or abandoned by their escorts. The rest of the convoy sailed into a minefield, a destroyer hit a mine and sank, the two surviving merchantmen and the remaining escorts reaching Malta that night.

==== Afternoon ====
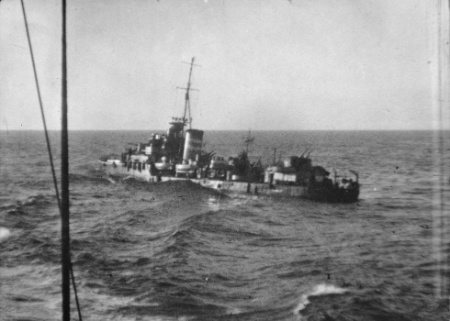
HMAS Nestor sinking, 16 June 1942

The 11:51 a.m. order from Harwood to turn for Malta reached Vian at 1:45 p.m. but Axis bombers had attacked from 11:50 a.m. when 20 Ju 87s attacked. Most of the Ju 87s (Stuka) dive-bombers attacked the escorts but City of Edinburgh and City of Pretoria was near-missed and slightly damaged, City of Edinburgh claiming a bomber and a probable. Ajax was attacked by five aircraft at 1:00 p.m. and six Ju 87s bombed Birmingham, one near miss putting a front turret out of action for one Stuka shot down. The convoy escorts received a reconnaissance report that the battleships were closer and the convoy continued east, the signal granting discretion arriving at 2:20 p.m. At 3:20 p.m., 36 Axis aircraft returned and again concentrated on warships. HMS Airedale on the starboard quarter was attacked by twelve Stukas (from StG 3) was disabled and HMS Aldenham was ordered to sink the ship rather than linger in Bomb Alley. The other 24 Stukas attacked the merchant ships with no result and Centurion, which survived and shot down a bomber.

The Italian ships were close to contact but Supermarina ordered Iachino to turn away when only 110 nmi (130 mi; 200 km) from the convoy if the British had not been engaged by 4:00 p.m. At 3:15 a.m. the battlefleet turned north-west, towards Navarino (Pylos) ready to advance should the British try again. British aircraft shadowing the battlefleet reported the turn at 4:05 p.m. and at 16:25 p.m. Harwood ordered Vian to turn the convoy again, asking if the Hunts and other ships had fuel enough to make Malta, the cruisers and fleet destroyers to turn for Malta after dark. Convoy MW 11 was under attack when the signal arrived and after waiting for two hours for a reply, Harwood ordered that only the four fastest merchantmen, Arethusa and two destroyers should make a dash for Malta. The convoy and escorts had been attacked again from 5:20–7:20 p.m. by Ju 87s dive-bombing and Ju 88s bombing from 16,000 ft (4,900 m) as ten SM 79s attacked with torpedoes. Three ships received near misses but radar directed anti-aircraft fire in the growing darkness made the attackers cautious. At 6:00 p.m., Ju 88s attacked in a shallow dive, near-missed Arethusa and Centurion and badly damaged Nestor. The SM 79s attacked after one had been shot down by two Beaufighters and three more were shot down by ships' gunners, along with two bombers. German bombers in Libya flew 193 sorties against Vigorous from 14 to 15 June which gave some respite to the Eighth Army as it retreated towards the Egyptian frontier but left RAF landing grounds around Gambut vulnerable to attack.

==== Evening ====
As the SM 79s departed, Vian signalled to Harwood that Force A and Convoy MW 11 had less than 1/3 of their ammunition left and at 8:53 p.m., Harwood ordered Operation Vigorous to be abandoned and the ships to return to Alexandria. The Italian battlefleet continued away from the convoy, lost the British shadowing aircraft at 4:40 p.m. and the relief aircraft was intercepted by German fighters. The 1st and 10th Submarine flotillas tried to reach a position to intercept but British signals were taking about four hours to arrive; some boats surfaced to listen to signals traffic and use the information. HMS Porpoise sailed north at 3:35 p.m. was bombed at 7:35 p.m., losing the chance to attack and HMS P222 to the west was also forced to dive at 8:00 p.m. Another reconnaissance aircraft from Malta found the fleet at 10:55 p.m. and the five 38 Squadron Wellington torpedo-bombers attacked at 0:30 a.m. The attack was thwarted by smoke screens and the evasive manoeuvres of the fleet, except for a torpedo hit on Littorio which caused superficial damage.

=== Night, 15/16 and 16 June ===
Another Axis air attack had no effect and during the night the convoy zig-zagged eastwards at 13 kn (24 km/h; 15 mph), with Nestor falling behind, down at the bow, towed by Javelin and escorted by Eridge and Beaufort. At 1:27 a.m. U-205 (Korvettenkapitän Franz-Georg Reschke) got through the anti-submarine cordon around Convoy MW 11 and torpedoed Hermione, which heeled over and sank, 88 men being killed and with about 400 survivors. Two air attacks were made on Nestor and its escorts and at 4:30 a.m. the tow parted for the second time; with dawn due and the long summer day to follow, the captain of the Australian destroyer Nestor decided that the risk to the other destroyers was too great and had Nestor sunk at 7:00 a.m. The other destroyers caught up with the convoy during the afternoon. City of Calcutta sailed from Tobruk with Tetcott and Primula and more attempts by U-boats to attack Convoy MW 11 failed, the convoy reaching Alexandria that evening. Centurion was too deep in the water and waited at the Great Pass as the five remaining merchantmen entered port. Bulkoil and Ajax were escorted to Port Said by four destroyers.

== Aftermath ==
=== Analysis ===
In 1960, Ian Playfair, the British official historian, wrote that the relationship of the "battle for supplies" with the land war reached a climax in the second half of 1942. Far from the Eighth Army capturing airfields to the west in the Cyrenaican bulge, it had been defeated at Gazala while Operation Julius was on and lost the landing grounds to the east. The disaster at Gazala had led to the military forces on Malta trying to save Egypt rather than vice versa. Convoy MW 11 had been a "disappointing operation" and turned back because the British and US air attacks on the Italian battlefleet had failed to inflict the damage hoped. Force A could not hope to defeat it in a surface action, a view echoed by Greene and Massignani in 2003.

By the time that the Italian battleships had been ordered back, the convoy and escorts lacked the ammunition to continue and seven long-range Beaufighters had been lost, depriving Vigorous of air cover while beyond the reach of short-range fighters. Communications had been inadequate, with some signals taking too long to arrive but Playfair wrote that without airfields in the west of Cyrenaica, even quick and accurate reports would be of no help. Six freighters in Vigorous and Harpoon had been sunk and nine forced to return to port. Two ships of Operation Harpoon reached Malta and delivered 15,000 long tons (15,000 t) of supplies, that, with a decent harvest, might keep the population of Malta fed until September. The depletion of aviation fuel led to fighters being give priority over the offensive force. Transit flights through Malta except for Beaufort torpedo bombers was suspended, only close range air attacks on easy targets were permitted and fuel for the fighters was carried to Malta by submarine.

In 1962, the British naval official historian, Stephen Roskill, called the Axis success undeniable. Malta had not been supplied and the British had lost a cruiser, three destroyers and two merchantmen against the sinking of Trento and minor damage to Littorio. No attempt was made to run another convoy from Alexandria until the Eighth Army had conquered Libya. Roskill wrote that with hindsight, the course of events on land made naval operations in the central Mediterranean inherently dangerous and the withdrawal of the Eighth Army lost one of the airfields being used for air cover. Harwood was right that the bomber and torpedo-bomber force was too small and had not compensated for the lack of battleships and with Axis aircraft based along the route to Malta, air power had decided the course of events. On land, the diversion of Axis bombers against the convoys had been of some benefit to the British as they conducted the "scuttle" to El Alamein. In 1941 30 of 31 merchant ships sailing for Malta arrived but in the first seven months of 1942, of the 30 ships that sailed, ten were sunk, ten turned back damaged, three were sunk on arrival and seven delivered their supplies.

In 2003, Richard Woodman wrote that the 14 June order from Harwood, for the convoy to continue west before turning back, showed indecision and a lack of strategic sense, risking valuable merchant ships in the hope that British submarine and air attacks might enable the convoy to proceed. Vigorous had been an "imperial balls-up" and the retreat to Alexandria an Axis victory, showing that Britain had lost control of the central Mediterranean. On 16 June, Harwood reported that

We are outnumbered both in surface ships and Air Force and very gallant endeavour of all concerned cannot make up for...the deficiency.

In a later report, Harwood blamed the RAF for its inability to provide enough aircraft capable of defeating the Italian battle fleet. The only success in Operation Julius was the arrival of two of the Harpoon ships at Malta; on land, Tobruk surrendered a few days after Convoy MW 11 returned to port and by late June, the Eighth Army had retreated to El Alamein.

=== Casualties ===
The cruiser Hermione, destroyers Airedale, Hasty and Nestor and two merchant ships were sunk during Operation Vigorous; three cruisers, a destroyer and a corvette were damaged. British aircraft and submarines sank the cruiser Trento and damaged Littorio; anti-aircraft gunners on the escorts and merchant ships shot down 21 of about 220 attacking aircraft. Two destroyers were sunk during Operation Harpoon, a cruiser, three destroyers and a minesweeper were damaged, an Italian destroyer was slightly damaged, the RAF lost five aircraft, the FAA seven and claimed 22 Axis aircraft.

=== Subsequent operations ===
During July, the submarines HMS Parthian and Clyde delivered aviation fuel, ammunition and other stores; another 59 Spitfires were flown off Eagle during sorties on 15 and 21 July. Welshman made its third trip and arrived on 16 July; at the end of the month the 10th Submarine Flotilla returned and the minesweepers with Harpoon had reduced the mine danger in the Malta approaches. Early in July Axis bombers had dropped another 700 long tons (710 t) of bombs, mainly on airfields, destroyed 17 aircraft on the ground and damaged many others. The fighters flew about 1,000 sorties and lost 36 Spitfires out of 135, the Axis forces losing 65 aircraft. Losses forced the Luftwaffe and Regia Aeronautica to increase the number of fighter sorties per bomber and then to resort to hit and run attacks by fighter-bombers. Later in July, the greater number of British fighters at Malta justified a return to intercepting raids further out to sea, which had great success.

Operation Pedestal (13–15 August) was another Malta convoy. Enough supplies were delivered by the British for the population and military forces on Malta to resist, although it had ceased to be an offensive base. Pedestal was a costly tactical defeat for the Allies, the last Axis Mediterranean victory and one of the greatest British strategic victories of the war. Five of the 14 merchant ships reached Grand Harbour but the arrival of SS Ohio justified the decision to hazard so many warships. The aviation fuel in Ohio revitalised the Malta air offensive against Axis shipping. After Pedestal, submarines returned to Malta and Spitfires from the aircraft carrier HMS Furious enabled a maximum effort to be made against Axis ships. Italian convoys had to be routed further away from the island, lengthening the journey and increasing the time during which air and naval attacks could be mounted. The Siege of Malta was broken by the Second Battle of El Alamein (23 October – 11 November) and Operation Torch (8–16 November) in the western Mediterranean, which enabled land-based aircraft to escort merchant ships to the island.

== Allied order of battle ==
=== Convoy MW 11 ===
Convoyed ships
Ship	Year	Flag	GRT	Notes
Convoy MW 11a
MV Ajax	1931	Merchant Navy	7,540	
SS City of Edinburgh	1938	Merchant Navy	8,036	
SS City of Lincoln	1938	Merchant Navy	8,039	
SS City of Pretoria	1937	Merchant Navy	8,049	
SS Elizabeth Bakke	1937	Norway	5,450	Sent back due to lack of speed
Convoy MW 11b
SS Bulkoil	1942	United States	8,071	Convoy Commodore
MV Potaro	1940	Merchant Navy	5,410	
HMS Antwerp	1919	Royal Navy	2,957	Rescue ship
HMS Malines	1921	Royal Navy	2,969	Rescue ship
HMS Centurion	1911	Royal Navy		King George V-class battleship decoy
Convoy MW 11c (Operation Rembrandt)
MV Aagtekirk	1934	Norway	6,811	Towing MTB 259
SS Bhutan	1929	Merchant Navy	6,104	Towing MTB 261
SS City of Calcutta	1940	Merchant Navy	8,063	Towing MTB 262, damaged by bomb, sent to Tobruk
SS Rembrandt	1940	Merchant Navy	5,560	Towing MTB 264

=== Mediterranean Fleet ===
Escort forces
Name	Flag	Type	Notes
Convoy MW 11a
HMS Hotspur	Royal Navy	H-class destroyer	2nd Destroyer Flotilla (Eastern Fleet)
HMS Inconstant	Royal Navy	I-class destroyer	12th Destroyer Flotilla (Eastern Fleet)
HMAS Napier	Royal Navy	N-class destroyer	7th Destroyer Flotilla (Eastern Fleet)
HMAS Nestor	Royal Navy	N-class destroyer	7th Destroyer Flotilla (Eastern Fleet) sunk
HMAS Nizam	Royal Navy	N-class destroyer	7th Destroyer Flotilla (Eastern Fleet)
HMAS Norman	Royal Navy	N-class destroyer	7th Destroyer Flotilla (Eastern Fleet)
HMS Boston	Royal Navy	Bangor-class minesweeper	
HMS Seaham	Royal Navy	Bangor-class minesweeper	
Convoy MW 11b
HMS Zulu	Royal Navy	Tribal-class destroyer	22nd Destroyer Flotilla
HMS Fortune	Royal Navy	F-class destroyer	2nd Destroyer Flotilla (Eastern Fleet)
HMS Kelvin	Royal Navy	K-class destroyer	14th Destroyer Flotilla
HMS Pakenham	Royal Navy	P-class destroyer	12th Destroyer Flotilla (Eastern Fleet)
HMS Paladin	Royal Navy	P-class destroyer	12th Destroyer Flotilla (Eastern Fleet)
HMS Delphinium	Royal Navy	Flower-class corvette	
HMS Erica	Royal Navy	Flower-class corvette	
HMS Primula	Royal Navy	Flower-class corvette	
HMS Snapdragon	Royal Navy	Flower-class corvette	
MW 11c
HMS Coventry	Royal Navy	C-class cruiser	
HMS Airedale	Royal Navy	Hunt-class destroyer	5th Destroyer Flotilla, sunk
HMS Aldenham	Royal Navy	Hunt-class destroyer	5th Destroyer Flotilla
HMS Beaufort	Royal Navy	Hunt-class destroyer	5th Destroyer Flotilla
HMS Croome	Royal Navy	Hunt-class destroyer	5th Destroyer Flotilla
HMS Dulverton	Royal Navy	Hunt-class destroyer	
HMS Eridge	Royal Navy	Hunt-class destroyer	5th Destroyer Flotilla
HMS Exmoor	Royal Navy	Hunt-class destroyer	5th Destroyer Flotilla
HMS Hurworth	Royal Navy	Hunt-class destroyer	5th Destroyer Flotilla

=== Cruisers ===
Cruiser cover
Name	Flag	Type	Notes
HMS Arethusa	Royal Navy	Arethusa-class cruiser	15th Cruiser Squadron
HMS Cleopatra	Royal Navy	Dido-class cruiser	15th Cruiser Squadron
HMS Dido	Royal Navy	Dido-class cruiser	15th Cruiser Squadron
HMS Euryalus	Royal Navy	Dido-class cruiser	15th Cruiser Squadron
HMS Hermione	Royal Navy	Dido-class cruiser	15th Cruiser Squadron, sunk
HMS Birmingham	Royal Navy	Town-class cruiser	4th Cruiser Squadron
HMS Newcastle	Royal Navy	Town-class cruiser	4th Cruiser Squadron
HMS Sikh	Royal Navy	Tribal-class destroyer	22nd Destroyer Flotilla
HMS Griffin	Royal Navy	G-class destroyer	2nd Destroyer Flotilla
HMS Hasty	Royal Navy	H-class destroyer	22nd Destroyer Flotilla, sunk
HMS Hero	Royal Navy	H-class destroyer	22nd Destroyer Flotilla
HMS Jervis	Royal Navy	J-class destroyer	14th Destroyer Flotilla
HMS Javelin	Royal Navy	J-class destroyer	14th Destroyer Flotilla
HMS Tetcott	Royal Navy	Hunt-class destroyer	5th Destroyer Flotilla

=== FAA–RAF ===
Squadrons involved Operation Julius.
Name	Flag	Type	Notes
Fleet Air Arm squadrons
815 Naval Air Squadron	Royal Navy	Swordfish	Air-to-surface-vessel radar (ASV)
821 Naval Air Squadron	Royal Navy	Albacore	Bomber/torpedo-bomber
825 Naval Air Squadron	Royal Navy	Albacore	Bomber/torpedo-bomber
830 Naval Air Squadron	Royal Navy	Albacore	Bomber/torpedo-bomber
RAF squadrons
69 Squadron	Royal Air Force	Baltimore	Reconnaissance bomber
217 Squadron	Royal Air Force	Beaufort	Torpedo-bomber
39 Squadron	Royal Air Force	Beaufort	Torpedo-bomber
203 Squadron	Royal Air Force	Blenheim	Bomber
13th Light Bomber Squadron	Hellenic Air Force	Blenheim	Bomber
203 Squadron	Royal Air Force	Maryland	Bomber
459 Squadron RAAF	Royal Air Force	Hudson	Maritime reconnaissance
2 PRU	Royal Air Force	Spitfire	Photographic reconnaissance
230 Squadron	Royal Air Force	Sunderland	Maritime patrol (flying boat)
47 Squadron	Royal Air Force	Wellesley	Bomber
38 Squadron	Royal Air Force	Wellington	Torpedo-bomber
221 Squadron (det.)	Royal Air Force	Wellington	Air-to-surface-vessel radar (ASV)

== Axis order of battle ==
=== Italian battlefleet ===
Main Italian force
Name	Flag	Type	Notes
Littorio	Kingdom of Italy	Littorio-class battleship	9th Division
Vittorio Veneto	Kingdom of Italy	Littorio-class battleship	9th Division
Gorizia	Kingdom of Italy	Zara-class cruiser	3rd Division
Trento	Kingdom of Italy	Trento-class cruiser	3rd Division
Duca d'Aosta	Kingdom of Italy	Condottieri-class cruiser	8th Division
Giuseppe Garibaldi	Kingdom of Italy	Condottieri-class cruiser	8th Division
Folgore	Kingdom of Italy	Folgore-class destroyer	7th Flotilla
Freccia	Kingdom of Italy	Freccia-class destroyer	7th Flotilla
Saetta	Kingdom of Italy	Freccia-class destroyer	7th Flotilla
Antonio Pigafetta	Kingdom of Italy	Navigatori-class destroyer	13th Flotilla
Alpino	Kingdom of Italy	Soldati-class destroyer	13th Flotilla
Corazziere	Kingdom of Italy	Soldati-class destroyer	
Aviere	Kingdom of Italy	Soldati-class destroyer	11th Flotilla
Bersagliere	Kingdom of Italy	Soldati-class destroyer	13th Flotilla
Camicia Nera	Kingdom of Italy	Soldati-class destroyer	11th Flotilla
Geniere	Kingdom of Italy	Soldati-class destroyer	11th Flotilla
Legionario	Kingdom of Italy	Soldati-class destroyer	7th Flotilla
Mitragliere	Kingdom of Italy	Soldati-class destroyer	13th Flotilla

=== S-boats and U-boats ===
S-Boats and U-boats
Name	Flag	Class	Notes
3rd S-Boat Flotilla
S 54	Kriegsmarine	S-boot	From Derna
S 55	Kriegsmarine	S-boot	From Derna, sank HMS Hasty 14 June
S 56	Kriegsmarine	S-boot	From Derna, damaged HMS Newcastle 14 June
S 58	Kriegsmarine	S-boot	From Derna
S 59	Kriegsmarine	S-boot	From Derna
S 60	Kriegsmarine	S-boot	From Derna
U-boat
U-205	Kriegsmarine	Type VIIC	Sank HMS Hermione

=== Luftwaffe ===
Luftwaffe
Name	Flag	Type	Notes
I./Kampfgeschwader 54	Luftwaffe	Junkers Ju 88	From Crete, damaged City of Calcutta 12 June
Lehrgeschwader 1	Luftwaffe	Junkers Ju 88	From Crete, sank Bhutan, damaged Potaro 14 June

== See also ==
- Battle of the Mediterranean
- Bonner Fellers
- Malta Convoys
