= Battle of Mid-June =

Battle of Mid-June 1942 refers to two simultaneous WW2 naval actions in the Mediterranean.

- Operation Harpoon, 12-15 June 1942
- Operation Vigorous, 11-16 June 1942

== See also ==
- Operation Pedestal known as the battle of mid-August 1942.
