= D98 =

D98 may refer to:

- HMS Emperor (D98)
- HMS York (D98)
- HMS Effingham (D98)
- Greek destroyer Psara (D98)
