= Italian destroyer Dardo (1930) =

Destroyer of the Regia Marina

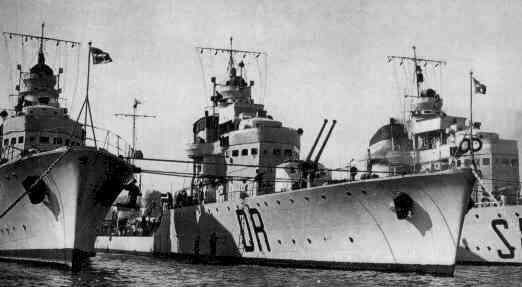
- Dardo (center) with her sisters Strale and Saetta, 1932

History

Kingdom of Italy
- Name: Dardo
- Namesake: Dart
- Builder: Cantieri navali Odero, Sestri Ponente
- Laid down: 23 January 1929
- Launched: 6 September 1930
- Commissioned: 26 January 1932
- Captured: by Germany, September 1943

Nazi Germany
- Name: TA31
- Acquired: September 1943
- Fate: Sunk, 24 April 1945

General characteristics (as built)
- Class & type: Freccia-class destroyer
- Displacement: 1,225 t (1,206 long tons) (standard); 2,150 t (2,120 long tons) (full load)
- Length: 96.15 m (315 ft 5 in)
- Beam: 9.75 m (32 ft 0 in)
- Draught: 3.15 m (10 ft 4 in)
- Installed power: 3 Thornycroft boilers; 44,000 hp (33,000 kW)
- Propulsion: 2 shafts; 2 geared steam turbines
- Speed: 30 knots (56 km/h; 35 mph)
- Range: 4,600 nmi (8,500 km; 5,300 mi) at 12 knots (22 km/h; 14 mph)
- Complement: 185
- Armament: 2 × twin 120 mm (4.7 in) guns; 2 × single 40 mm (1.6 in) AA guns; 2 × twin 13.2 mm (0.52 in) machine guns; 2 × triple 533 mm (21 in) torpedo tubes; 2 × depth charge throwers; 54 mines

Dardo was one of four Freccia-class destroyers built for the Regia Marina (Royal Italian Navy) in the early 1930s. Completed in 1932, she served in World War II. The ship was captured by the Germans after the Italian armistice in September 1943 and used by the Kriegsmarine under the name TA31 until she was sunk in April 1945.

== Design and description ==
The Freccia-class destroyers were enlarged and improved versions of the preceding Turbine class. They had an overall length of 96.15 meters (315 ft 5 in), a beam of 9.75 meters (32 ft 0 in) and a mean draft of 3.15 meters (10 ft 4 in). They displaced 1,225 metric tons (1,206 long tons) at standard load, and 2,150 metric tons (2,120 long tons) at deep load. Their complement during wartime was 185 officers and enlisted men.

The Freccias were powered by two Parsons geared steam turbines, each driving one propeller shaft using steam supplied by three Thornycroft boilers. The turbines were designed to produce 44,000 shaft horsepower (33,000 kW) and a speed of 30 knots (56 km/h; 35 mph) in service, although the ships reached speeds of 38–39 knots (70–72 km/h; 44–45 mph) during their sea trials while lightly loaded. They carried enough fuel oil to give them a range of 4,600 nautical miles (8,500 km; 5,300 mi) at a speed of 12 knots (22 km/h; 14 mph).

Their main battery consisted of four 120-millimeter (4.7 in) guns in two twin-gun turrets, one each fore and aft of the superstructure. Anti-aircraft (AA) defense for the Freccia-class ships was provided by a pair of 40-millimeter (1.6 in) AA guns in single mounts amidships and a pair of twin-gun mounts for 13.2-millimeter (0.52 in) machine guns. They were equipped with six 533-millimeter (21 in) torpedo tubes in two triple mounts amidships. Although the ships were not provided with a sonar system for anti-submarine work, they were fitted with a pair of depth charge throwers. The Freccias could carry 54 mines.

== Construction and career ==
Dardo was laid down by Cantieri navali Odero at their Genoa-Sestri Ponente shipyard on 23 January 1929, launched on 6 September 1930 and commissioned on 21 January 1932.

== Bibliography ==
- Brescia, Maurizio (2012). Mussolini's Navy: A Reference Guide to the Regina Marina 1930–45. Annapolis, Maryland: Naval Institute Press. ISBN 978-1-59114-544-8.
- Fraccaroli, Aldo (1968). Italian Warships of World War II. Shepperton, UK: Ian Allan. ISBN 0-7110-0002-6.
- Roberts, John (1980). "Italy". In Chesneau, Roger (ed.). Conway's All the World's Fighting Ships 1922–1946. New York: Mayflower Books. pp. 280–317. ISBN 0-8317-0303-2.
- Rohwer, Jürgen (2005). Chronology of the War at Sea 1939–1945: The Naval History of World War Two (Third Revised ed.). Annapolis, Maryland: Naval Institute Press. ISBN 1-59114-119-2.
- Whitley, M. J. (1988). Destroyers of World War 2: An International Encyclopedia. Annapolis, Maryland: Naval Institute Press. ISBN 1-85409-521-8.
