= D97 =

D97 may refer to:

- HMS Corunna (D97)
- HMS Biter (D97)
- HMS Edinburgh (D97)
- Greek destroyer Hydra (D97)
