= Greek destroyer Spetsai =

History

Greece
- Namesake: Spetses Island
- Builder: Cantieri Odero
- Launched: 1932
- Commissioned: 1933
- Decommissioned: 1946
- Identification: D-83
- Fate: Stricken 1946

General characteristics
- Class & type: Kountouriotis-class destroyer
- Displacement: Full load 2,050 tons; Standard 1,389 tons
- Length: 92 m (302 ft)
- Beam: 9.5 m (31 ft)
- Draft: 3.65 m (12.0 ft)
- Propulsion: Boilers: 3, Engines: 2 shaft Parsons type geared turbines, Power: 44,000 hp
- Speed: 38 knots (70 km/h; 44 mph) maximum
- Complement: 156
- Armament: 4 × 4.7 in (120 mm) (4 × 1); 3 × 40 mm/39 pom-pom A/A guns (3 × 1); 4 × 13.2 mm MG; 6 × 21 in T/T; 54 mines

The Greek destroyer Spetsai (D-83) (Greek: ΒΠ Σπέτσαι) was a Greek destroyer of the Kountouriotis class, which served with the Hellenic Navy during the Second World War. It was named after the Saronic Gulf island of Spetses, which played an important role in the Greek War of Independence, and was the fourth ship to bear this name.

She was constructed in Sestri Ponente, Italy, by Cantieri Odero, and commissioned by the Hellenic Navy in 1933. After the outbreak of the Greco-Italian War, she participated in the naval operations, among which was the third naval raid against Italian shipping in the Strait of Otranto (4–5 January 1941). During the German invasion of Greece, along with several other ships, she managed to flee to Alexandria. After undergoing repairs and modernization in Calcutta, she returned to escort duties in the Mediterranean Sea, with the British pennant number H 38. She returned to Greece after liberation in October 1944 and was decommissioned in 1946.
