= HMS Airedale =

British naval ship

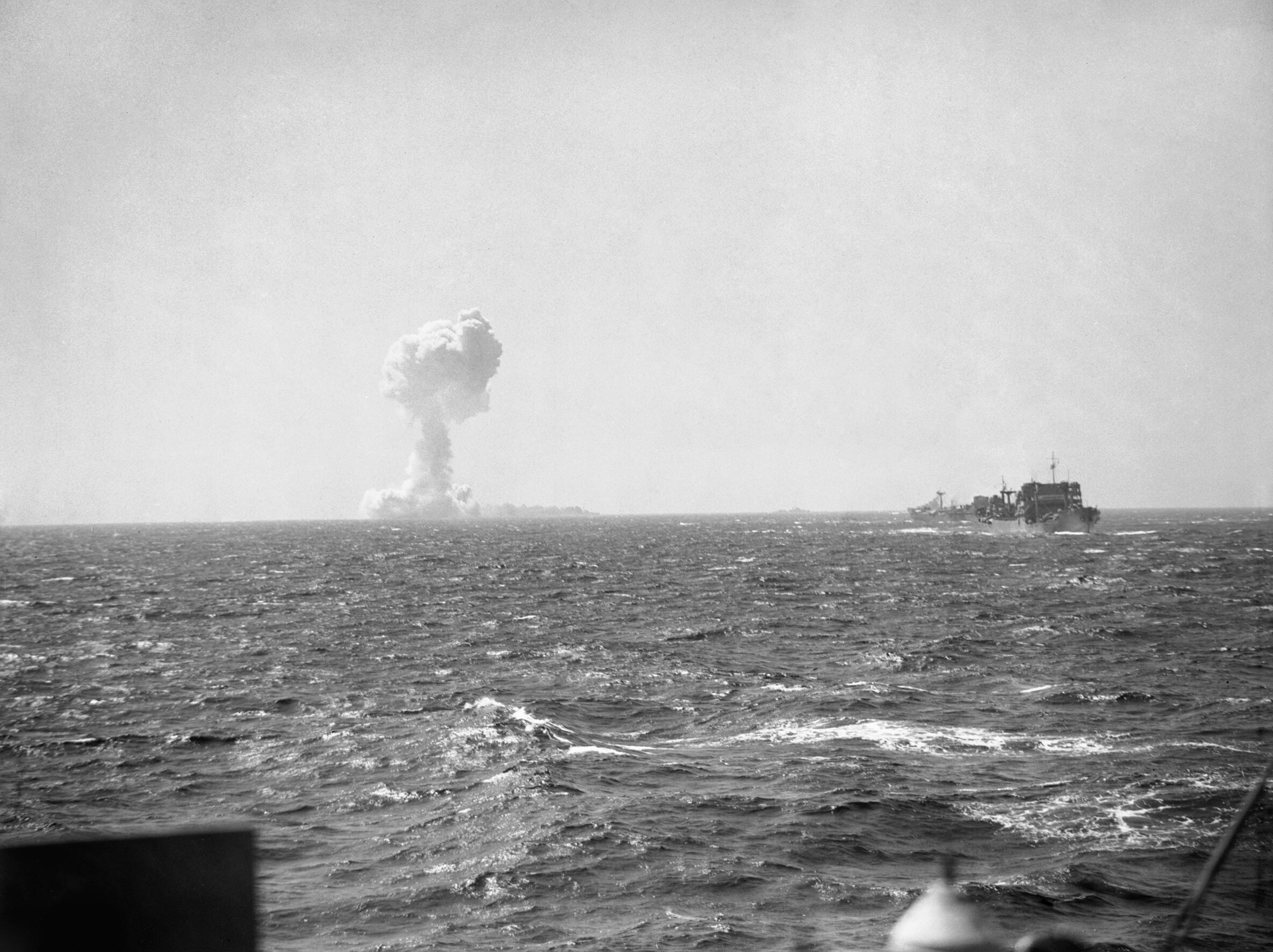
- On the horizon HMS Airedale seen blowing up after a direct hit from enemy bombers during a convoy from Alexandria to Malta.

History

United Kingdom
- Name: HMS Airedale
- Ordered: 4 July 1940
- Builder: John Brown & Company, Clydebank
- Laid down: 20 November 1940
- Launched: 12 August 1941
- Commissioned: 8 January 1942
- Identification: Pennant number: L07
- Fate: Sunk 15 June 1942, 33° 50'N, 23° 50'E

General characteristics
- Class & type: Type III Hunt-class destroyer
- Displacement: 1,050 long tons (1,067 t) standard, 1,490 long tons (1,514 t) full load
- Length: 264 ft 3 in (80.54 m) pp, 280 ft (85.34 m) oa
- Beam: 31 ft 6 in (9.60 m)
- Draught: 7 ft 9 in (2.36 m)
- Propulsion: 2 Admiralty 3-drum boilers; 2 shaft Parsons geared turbines, 19,000 shp (14,000 kW)
- Speed: 27 kn (50 km/h; 31 mph)
- Range: 3,700 nmi (6,900 km; 4,300 mi) at 14 kn (26 km/h; 16 mph)
- Complement: 168
- Armament: 4 × QF 4 in Mark XVI guns on twin mounts Mk. XIX; 4 × QF 2 pdr Mk. VIII (1 × quad mount); 3 × 20 mm Oerlikons; 2 × 21 in (533 mm) torpedo tubes; 70 depth charges, 4 throwers, 2 racks

HMS Airedale was a Hunt-class destroyer built for use by the British Royal Navy during the Second World War. She entered service in early 1942 as a convoy escort, being assigned to the Mediterranean Fleet in May. Airedale was sunk while escorting a convoy from Alexandria to Malta on 15 June 1942 by Sturzkampfgeschwader 3.

== Construction and design ==
Airedale was one of seven Type III Hunt-class destroyers ordered for the Royal Navy on 4 July 1940, as part of the 1940 War Emergency Programme. The Hunt class was meant to fill the Royal Navy's need for a large number of small destroyer-type vessels capable of both convoy escort and operations with the fleet. The Type III Hunts differed from the previous Type II ships in replacing a twin 4-inch gun mount by two torpedo tubes to improve their ability to operate as destroyers.

The Type III Hunts were 264 feet 3 inches (80.54 m) long between perpendiculars and 280 feet (85.34 m) overall, with a beam was 31 feet 6 inches (9.60 m) and draught 7 feet 9 inches (2.36 m). Displacement was 1,050 long tons (1,067 t) standard and 1,490 long tons (1,514 t) under full load. Two Admiralty boilers raising steam at 300 pounds per square inch (2,100 kPa) and 620 °F (327 °C) fed Parsons single-reduction geared steam turbines that drove two propeller shafts, generating 19,000 shaft horsepower (14,000 kW) at 380 rpm. This gave a design maximum speed of 27 knots (50 km/h; 31 mph). 345 long tons (351 t) of oil fuel were carried, giving a range of 3,700 nautical miles (6,900 km; 4,300 mi) at 15 knots (28 km/h; 17 mph).

Main gun armament was four 4 inch (102 mm) QF Mk XVI dual purpose (anti-ship and anti-aircraft) guns in two twin mounts, with a quadruple 2-pounder "pom-pom" and three Oerlikon 20 mm cannon providing close-in anti-aircraft fire. Two 21-inch (533 mm) torpedo tubes were fitted in a single twin mount, while two depth charge chutes, four depth charge throwers and 70 depth charges comprised the ship's anti-submarine armament. Type 291 and Type 285 radar was fitted, as was Type 128 sonar.

Airedale was laid down at the Clydebank shipyard of the shipbuilders John Brown & Company on 20 November 1940 was launched on 12 August 1941 and was completed on 8 January 1942.

== Service ==
Airedale joined the Home Fleet at Scapa Flow for workup after commissioning, and on 14 February 1942 left Kirkwall in Orkney as part of the escort of the Arctic convoy PQ 11 on the first stage of its journey to Murmansk in Northern Russia. During March she escorted the SS Queen Victoria to Gibraltar and then the cruiser Dauntless to the Cape of Good Hope. She was then assigned to the Mediterranean Fleet, arriving in Alexandria on 1 May, joining the 5th Destroyer Flotilla. On 10 May, the 14th Destroyer Flotilla (Jackal, Jervis Kipling and Lively) set out from Alexandria to intercept an Italian convoy sailing from Italy to Benghazi. The flotilla was sighted by German reconnaissance aircraft on the afternoon of 11 May, and despite abandoning the mission and turning back towards Alexandria, came under heavy air attack from German bombers. Lively and Kipling were sunk and Jackal was badly damaged by the attacks, with Jackal being taken under tow by Jervis. Airedale, along with sister ships Beaufort, Dulverton and Hurworth and the destroyers Sikh and Hasty, were ordered out from Alexandria to escort Jervis and Jackal to the port. By the time that Airedale met up with Jervis and Jackal, it had been decided to abandon the tow, and Jackal was scuttled by Jervis.

On 13 June Airedale set out from Alexandria as part of the escort of a large convoy to Malta (Operation Vigorous), while a second convoy (Operation Harpoon) was sailing to Malta from Gibraltar. On 14 June the Vigorous convoy came under heavy air attack, sinking one merchant ship and damaging another. The convoy turned back towards Alexandria on receiving reports of the Italian fleet sailing to intercept, and in the night of 14/15 June, German motor torpedo boats took advantage of the disruption caused by the course change to successfully attack the convoy, damaging the cruiser Newcastle and sinking the destroyer Hasty. Air attacks continued on 15 June, with the cruiser Birmingham being damaged by a bomb, and then at about 15:20, twelve Junkers Ju 87 dive bombers of StG 3. She was near missed by three bombs and hit by two bombs near the aft 4-inch gun mount. One of these bombs caused one of the ship's magazines (either the aft 4-inch magazine or the depth charge storage) to explode, and starting a large fire aft. Airedale's crew abandoned ship and the ship was scuttled by gunfire from Hurworth and a torpedo from Aldenham. 45 of Airedale's crew were killed with 133 rescued.
