= Freccia-class destroyer =

1930s class of destroyers of the Italian and Greek navies

Freccia class
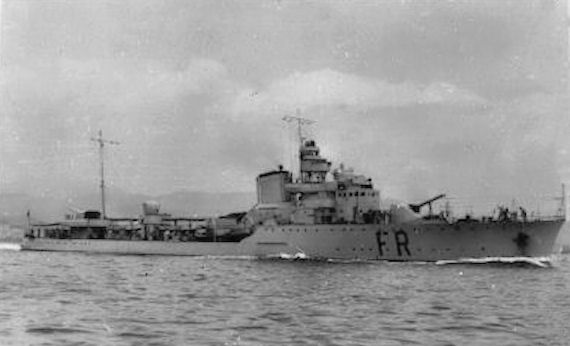
- Freccia

Class overview
- Name: Freccia class
- Builders: Cantieri del Tirreno, Riva Trigoso; Cantieri navali Odero, Sestri Ponente
- Operators: Regia Marina; (Greece) Royal Hellenic Navy
- Preceded by: Navigatori class
- Succeeded by: Folgore class
- Subclasses: Kountouriotis class
- Built: 1929–1933
- In commission: 1931–1946
- Completed: 8
- Lost: 6
- Scrapped: 2

General characteristics
- Type: Destroyer
- Displacement: 1,225 t (1,206 long tons) (standard); 2,150 t (2,120 long tons) (full load)
- Length: 96.15 m (315 ft 5 in)
- Beam: 9.75 m (32 ft 0 in)
- Draught: 3.3–4.3 m (10 ft 10 in – 14 ft 1 in)
- Installed power: 3 Thornycroft boilers; 44,000 hp (33,000 kW)
- Propulsion: 2 shafts; 2 geared steam turbines
- Speed: 30 knots (56 km/h; 35 mph)
- Range: 4,600 nmi (8,500 km; 5,300 mi) at 12 knots (22 km/h; 14 mph)
- Complement: 185
- Armament: 2 × twin 120 mm (4.7 in) guns; 2 × single 40 mm (1.6 in) AA guns; 2 × twin 13.2 mm (0.52 in) machine guns; 2 × triple 533 mm (21 in) torpedo tubes; 2 × depth charge throwers; 54 mines

The Freccia-class destroyer was a class of destroyers built for the Regia Marina (Royal Italian Navy) in the 1930s. Four modified ships were built and delivered in 1933 for Greece.

== Ships ==
=== Italian Navy ===
- Dardo

Built by Odero, Sestri Ponente
launched 6 September 1930, completed 25 January 1932
Captured by the Germans and renamed TA31. Scuttled on 24 April 1945.

- Freccia

Built by CT Riva Trigioso
launched 3 August 1930, completed 21 October 1931
In the Spanish Civil War, on 15 August 1937, she shelled, torpedoed and disabled the Panamanian tanker George McKnight off Tunis.
Sunk on 8 August 1943 off Genoa by bombing.

- Saetta

Built by CT Riva Trigioso
launched 17 January 1932, completed 10 May 1932
In the Spanish Civil War, on 11 August 1937, she torpedoed and sank the Spanish Republican tanker Campeador in the strait of Sicily.
Sunk by a mine on 3 February 1943 with the loss of 170 men including Lt. Cdr. Enea Picchio, the commanding officer, while 39 men survived.

- Strale

Built by Odero, Sestri Ponente
launched 26 March 1931, completed 6 February 1932
Rammed and sank UK submarine HMS Odin on 14 June 1940. Beached herself on 21 June 1942 near Cape Bon and was finished off by torpedoes from the submarine HMS Turbulent.

=== Hellenic Navy ===
The Greek Navy ordered four destroyers from the Italian company Odero in October 1929 to a modified design, similar to the Dardo type, as the RUSI Journal notes, for about £500,000 (equivalent to £35.4 million or US$43.99 million in 2023). It was named the Kountouriotis class. The chief difference with the Italian ships was the substitution of four single 120 mm guns (Ansaldo Model 1926) for the twin turrets used in the Italian Navy ships. According to the RUSI Journal, the ships' armament was to consist of four 4.7 inch, three 2-pounder, AA guns and six 21-inch (533 mm) torpedo tubes. The ships were to have a displacement of 1,450 tons, and a maximum speed of 40 knots.

- Hydra

Built by Odero, Sestri Ponente
launched 21 October 1931, commissioned November 1932
Sunk by German aircraft, 22 April 1941.

- Spetsai

Built by Odero, Sestri Ponente
commissioned May 1933
Served in World War II, decommissioned in 1946, Scrapped 1947.

- Psara

Built by Odero, Sestri Ponente
commissioned May 1933
Sunk by German aircraft, 20 April 1941.

- Kountouriotis

Built by Odero, Sestri Ponente
launched 29 August 1931, commissioned November 1932
Served in World War II, decommissioned and scrapped in 1946.

The two surviving ships, Spetsai and Kountouriotis, served in the Eastern Mediterranean as part of the Free Greek Navy until late 1943. They were then laid up at Port Said, Egypt for want of Italian spare parts, and because their crews were needed for new ships built in the UK for the Free Greek Navy.

== Bibliography ==
- Brescia, Maurizio (2012). Mussolini's Navy: A Reference Guide to the Regina Marina 1930–45. Annapolis, Maryland: Naval Institute Press. ISBN 978-1-59114-544-8.
- Campbell, John (1985). Naval Weapons of World War Two. Annapolis, Maryland: Naval Institute Press. ISBN 0-87021-459-4.
- Fraccaroli, Aldo (1968). Italian Warships of World War II. Shepperton, UK: Ian Allan. ISBN 0-7110-0002-6.
- Roberts, John (1980). "Italy". In Chesneau, Roger (ed.). Conway's All the World's Fighting Ships 1922–1946. New York: Mayflower Books. pp. 280–317. ISBN 0-8317-0303-2.
- Rohwer, Jürgen (2005). Chronology of the War at Sea 1939–1945: The Naval History of World War Two (Third Revised ed.). Annapolis, Maryland: Naval Institute Press. ISBN 1-59114-119-2.
- Smigielski, Adam (1995). "Italy". In Chumbley, Stephen (ed.). Conway's All the World's Fighting Ships 1947-1995. Annapolis, Maryland: Naval Institute Press. pp. 195–218. ISBN 1-55750-132-7.
- Whitley, M. J. (1988). Destroyers of World War 2: An International Encyclopedia. Annapolis, Maryland: Naval Institute Press. ISBN 1-85409-521-8.
