= Italian destroyer Corazziere =

Corazziere was the name of at least two ships of the Italian Navy and may refer to:

- Italian destroyer Corazziere (1909), a Soldato-class destroyer launched in 1909 and discarded in 1928.
- Italian destroyer Corazziere (1938), a Soldati-class destroyer launched in 1938 and scuttled in 1943. Refloated and again sunk in 1944.
