= Greek destroyer Psara =

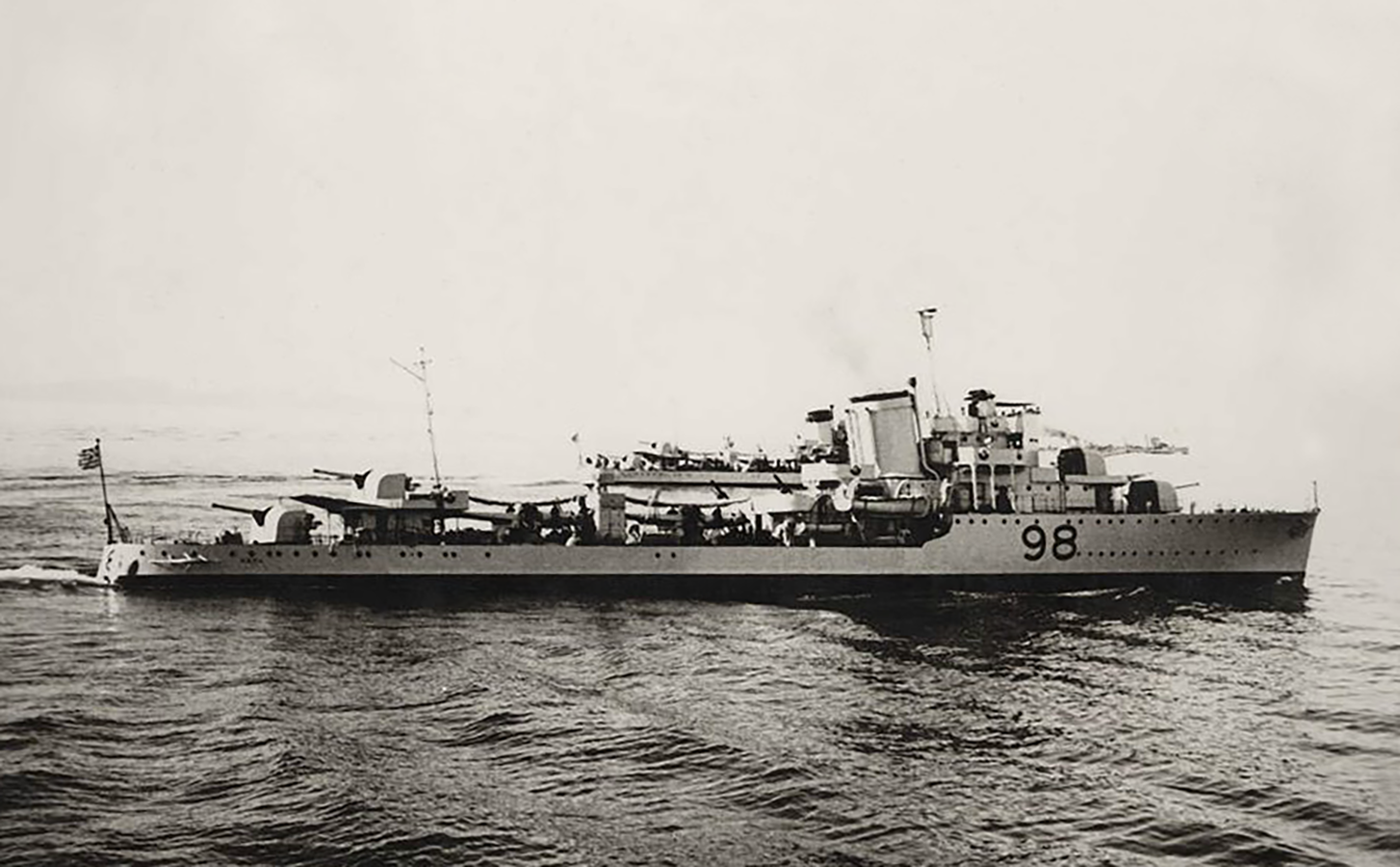
- Psara - ΒΠ Ψαρά (D-98)

History

Greece
- Namesake: Psara Island
- Builder: Cantieri Odero
- Launched: 1932
- Commissioned: 1 May 1933
- Identification: D-98
- Fate: Sunk 20 April 20, 1941

General characteristics
- Class & type: Kountouriotis-class destroyer
- Displacement: Full load 2,050 tons; Standard 1,389 tons
- Length: 92 m (302 ft)
- Beam: 9.5 m (31 ft)
- Draft: 3.65 m (12.0 ft)
- Propulsion: Boilers: 3, Engines: 2 shaft Parsons type geared turbines, Power: 44,000 hp
- Speed: 38 knots (70 km/h; 44 mph) maximum
- Complement: 156
- Armament: 4 × 4.7 in (120 mm) (4 × 1); 3 × 40 mm/39 pom-pom A/A guns (3 × 1); 4 × 13.2 mm MG; 6 × 21 in T/T

The Greek destroyer Psara (D-98) (Greek: ΒΠ Ψαρά) was a Greek destroyer of the Kountouriotis class, which served with the Hellenic Navy during the early stages of the Second World War. It was named after the Aegean island of Psara, which played an important role in the Greek War of Independence, and was the fourth ship to bear this name.

She was constructed in Sestri Ponente, Italy, by Cantieri Odero, and commissioned by the Hellenic Navy in 1933. After the outbreak of the Greco-Italian War, she participated in all three naval raids against Italian shipping in the Strait of Otranto (14–15 November 1940, 15–16 December 1940, and 4–5 January 1941), and had significant anti-submarine activity. During the German invasion of Greece, she was attacked by German bomber aircraft on April 20, 1941, and sunk in the Saronic Gulf near Megara, with 37 members of her crew as casualties.
