= Greek destroyer Hydra =

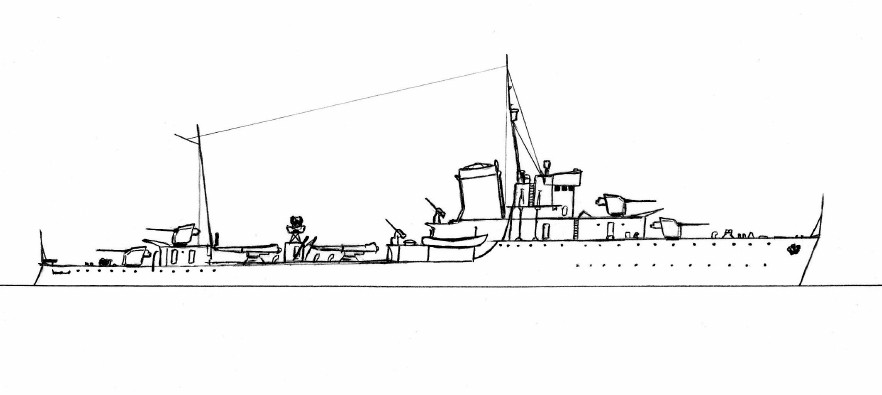
- Hydra (D 97) - ΒΠ Ύδρα (D 97)

History

Greece
- Namesake: Hydra Island
- Builder: Cantieri Odero
- Launched: 21 October 1931
- Commissioned: November 1932
- Fate: Bombed and sunk 22 April 1941 near Lagousa Island

General characteristics
- Class & type: Kountouriotis-class destroyer
- Displacement: Full load 2,050 tons; Standard 1,389 tons
- Length: 92 m (302 ft)
- Beam: 9.5 m (31 ft)
- Draft: 3.65 m (12.0 ft)
- Propulsion: Boilers: 3, Engines: 2 shaft Parsons type geared turbines, Power: 44,000 hp
- Speed: 38 knots (70 km/h; 44 mph) maximum
- Complement: 156
- Armament: 4 × 4.7 in (120 mm) (4 × 1); 3 × 40 mm/39 pom-pom A/A guns (3 × 1); 4 × 13.2 mm MG; 6 × 21 in T/T; 54 mines

Hydra (Greek: ΒΠ Ύδρα) (sometimes spelled Ydra) was a Greek destroyer of the Kountouriotis class, which served with the Hellenic Navy during the early stages of the Second World War. It was named after the Saronic Gulf island of Hydra, which played an important role in the Greek War of Independence, and was the fourth ship to bear this name.

== Design and construction ==
The Greek Navy ordered four destroyers from the Italian shipyard Cantieri Odero in October 1929, with the design similar to contemporary Italian destroyers such as the Freccia class. The ships were 92.35 m (300 ft) long between perpendiculars, with a beam of 9.75 m (30 ft) and a draft of 3.30 m (10 ft). Displacement was 1,389 long tons (1,411 t) standard and 2,050 long tons (2,080 t) full load. Three Yarrow Express boilers fed steam to two sets of Parsons geared steam turbines, with the machinery rated at 44,000 shp (33,000 kW), giving a speed of 38 kn (44 mph; 70 km/h). 630 long tons (640 t) of oil was carried, giving a range of 5,800 nmi (6,700 mi; 10,700 km) at 20 kn (23 mph; 37 km/h).

Armament consisted of four 120 mm (4.7 in) Ansaldo Model 1926 guns in single mounts, with anti aircraft protection provided by three 40 mm guns. Two triple 533 mm (21 inch) torpedo tubes were fitted, while Hydra was fitted for minelaying, and had rails for 40 mines. The ship had a crew of 156.

Hydra was launched at Odero's Sestri Ponente shipyard on 21 October 1931, and was commissioned by the Hellenic Navy in November 1932.

== Service ==
On 12 July 1940 Hydra went to the aid of the lighthouse tender Orion which had been attacked by Italian aircraft, and was itself attacked by the Italian aircraft, but was unharmed. After the outbreak of the Greco-Italian War, she participated in the first naval raid against Italian shipping in the Strait of Otranto (14–15 November 1940). During the German invasion of Greece, she was attacked by German bomber aircraft on 22 April 1941, and sunk near the island of Lagousa in the Saronic Gulf, together with her commander, Cmdr. Th. Pezopoulos and 41 members of her crew.
