= Italian destroyer Strale (1931) =

Destroyer of the Regia Marina

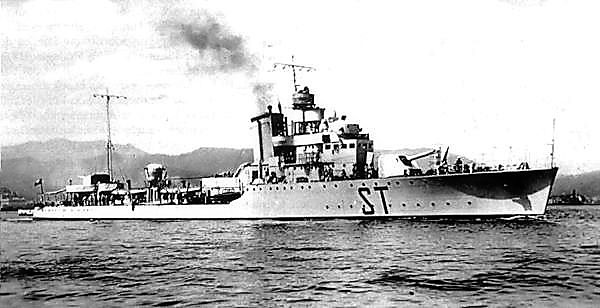

History

Italy
- Name: Strale
- Builder: Cantieri navali Odero, Genoa-Sestri Ponente
- Laid down: 20 February 1929
- Launched: 26 March 1931
- Commissioned: 6 February 1932
- Fate: Ran aground and wrecked, 21 March 1942; Destroyed by torpedoes, 21 June 1942

General characteristics (as built)
- Class & type: Freccia-class destroyer
- Displacement: 1,225 t (1,206 long tons) (standard); 2,150 t (2,120 long tons) (full load)
- Length: 96.15 m (315 ft 5 in)
- Beam: 9.75 m (32 ft 0 in)
- Draught: 3.15 m (10 ft 4 in)
- Installed power: 3 Thornycroft boilers; 44,000 hp (33,000 kW)
- Propulsion: 2 shafts; 2 geared steam turbines
- Speed: 30 knots (56 km/h; 35 mph)
- Range: 4,600 nmi (8,500 km; 5,300 mi) at 12 knots (22 km/h; 14 mph)
- Complement: 185
- Armament: 2 × twin 120 mm (4.7 in) guns; 2 × single 40 mm (1.6 in) AA guns; 2 × twin 13.2 mm (0.52 in) machine guns; 2 × triple 533 mm (21 in) torpedo tubes; 2 × depth charge throwers; 54 mines

Strale was one of four Freccia-class destroyers built for the Regia Marina (Royal Italian Navy) in the early 1930s. Completed in 1932, she played a minor role in the Spanish Civil War of 1936–1939 supporting the Spanish Nationalists and served in World War II.

== Design and description ==
The Freccia-class destroyers were enlarged and improved versions of the preceding Turbine class. They had an overall length of 96.15 meters (315 ft 5 in), a beam of 9.75 meters (32 ft 0 in) and a mean draft of 3.15 meters (10 ft 4 in). They displaced 1,225 metric tons (1,206 long tons) at standard load, and 2,150 metric tons (2,120 long tons) at deep load. Their complement during wartime was 185 officers and enlisted men.

The Freccias were powered by two Parsons geared steam turbines, each driving one propeller shaft using steam supplied by three Thornycroft boilers. The turbines were designed to produce 44,000 shaft horsepower (33,000 kW) and a speed of 30 knots (56 km/h; 35 mph) in service, although the ships reached speeds of 38–39 knots (70–72 km/h; 44–45 mph) during their sea trials while lightly loaded. They carried enough fuel oil to give them a range of 4,600 nautical miles (8,500 km; 5,300 mi) at a speed of 12 knots (22 km/h; 14 mph).

Their main battery consisted of four 120-millimeter (4.7 in) guns in two twin-gun turrets, one each fore and aft of the superstructure. Anti-aircraft (AA) defense for the Freccia-class ships was provided by a pair of 40-millimeter (1.6 in) AA guns in single mounts amidships and a pair of twin-gun mounts for 13.2-millimeter (0.52 in) machine guns. They were equipped with six 533-millimeter (21 in) torpedo tubes in two triple mounts amidships. Although the ships were not provided with a sonar system for anti-submarine work, they were fitted with a pair of depth charge throwers. The Freccias could carry 54 mines.

== Construction and career ==
Strale was laid down by Cantieri navali Odero at their Genoa-Sestri Ponente shipyard on 20 February 1929, launched on 26 March 1931 and commissioned on 6 February 1932. After the Italians entered World War II in June 1940, she and the destroyer Baleno rammed and sank the British submarine HMS Odin on 14 June. Strale accidentally ran aground near Cape Bon on 21 March 1942 and later was destroyed by torpedoes from the submarine HMS Turbulent on 21 June.

== Bibliography ==
- Brescia, Maurizio (2012). Mussolini's Navy: A Reference Guide to the Regina Marina 1930–45. Annapolis, Maryland: Naval Institute Press. ISBN 978-1-59114-544-8.
- Fraccaroli, Aldo (1968). Italian Warships of World War II. Shepperton, UK: Ian Allan. ISBN 0-7110-0002-6.
- Roberts, John (1980). "Italy". In Chesneau, Roger (ed.). Conway's All the World's Fighting Ships 1922–1946. New York: Mayflower Books. pp. 280–317. ISBN 0-8317-0303-2.
- Rohwer, Jürgen (2005). Chronology of the War at Sea 1939–1945: The Naval History of World War Two (Third Revised ed.). Annapolis, Maryland: Naval Institute Press. ISBN 1-59114-119-2.
- Whitley, M. J. (1988). Destroyers of World War 2: An International Encyclopedia. Annapolis, Maryland: Naval Institute Press. ISBN 1-85409-521-8.
