= Italian destroyer Saetta =

Destroyer of the Regia Marina

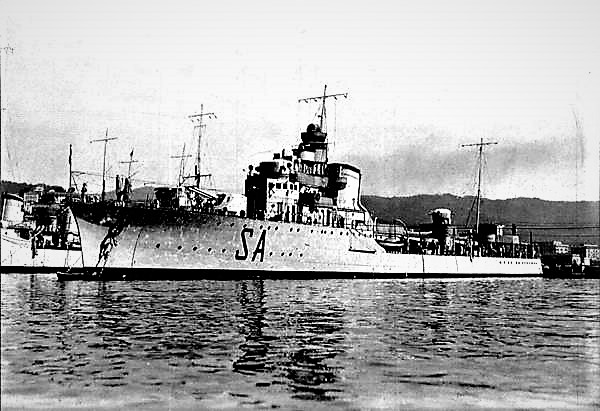
- Saetta, date unknown

History

Kingdom of Italy
- Name: Saetta
- Builder: Cantieri del Tirreno, Riva Trigoso
- Laid down: 27 May 1929
- Launched: 17 January 1932
- Completed: 10 May 1932
- Fate: Sunk by mine, 3 February 1943

General characteristics (as built)
- Class & type: Freccia-class destroyer
- Displacement: 1,225 t (1,206 long tons) (standard); 2,150 t (2,120 long tons) (full load)
- Length: 96.15 m (315 ft 5 in)
- Beam: 9.75 m (32 ft 0 in)
- Draught: 3.15 m (10 ft 4 in)
- Installed power: 3 Thornycroft boilers; 44,000 hp (33,000 kW)
- Propulsion: 2 shafts; 2 geared steam turbines
- Speed: 30 knots (56 km/h; 35 mph)
- Range: 4,600 nmi (8,500 km; 5,300 mi) at 12 knots (22 km/h; 14 mph)
- Complement: 185
- Armament: 2 × twin 120 mm (4.7 in) guns; 2 × single 40 mm (1.6 in) AA guns; 2 × twin 13.2 mm (0.52 in) machine guns; 2 × triple 533 mm (21 in) torpedo tubes; 2 × depth charge throwers; 54 mines

Saetta was one of four Freccia-class destroyers built for the Regia Marina (Royal Italian Navy) in the early 1930s. Completed in 1932, she served in World War II. She played a minor role in the Spanish Civil War of 1936–1939, supporting the Nationalists.

== Design and description ==
The Freccia-class destroyers were enlarged and improved versions of the preceding Turbine class. They had an overall length of 96.15 meters (315 ft 5 in), a beam of 9.75 meters (32 ft 0 in) and a mean draft of 3.15 meters (10 ft 4 in). They displaced 1,225 metric tons (1,206 long tons) at standard load, and 2,150 metric tons (2,120 long tons) at deep load. Their complement during wartime was 185 officers and enlisted men.

The Freccias were powered by two Parsons geared steam turbines, each driving one propeller shaft using steam supplied by three Thornycroft boilers. The turbines were designed to produce 44,000 shaft horsepower (33,000 kW) and a speed of 30 knots (56 km/h; 35 mph) in service, although the ships reached speeds of 38–39 knots (70–72 km/h; 44–45 mph) during their sea trials while lightly loaded. They carried enough fuel oil to give them a range of 4,600 nautical miles (8,500 km; 5,300 mi) at a speed of 12 knots (22 km/h; 14 mph).

Their main battery consisted of four 120-millimeter (4.7 in) guns in two twin-gun turrets, one each fore and aft of the superstructure. Anti-aircraft (AA) defense for the Freccia-class ships was provided by a pair of 40-millimeter (1.6 in) AA guns in single mounts amidships and a pair of twin-gun mounts for 13.2-millimeter (0.52 in) machine guns. They were equipped with six 533-millimeter (21 in) torpedo tubes in two triple mounts amidships. Although the ships were not provided with a sonar system for anti-submarine work, they were fitted with a pair of depth charge throwers. The Freccias could carry 54 mines.

== Construction and career ==
Saetta was laid down by Cantieri del Tirreno at their Riva Trigoso shipyard on 27 May 1929, launched on 17 January 1932 and commissioned on 10 May. During the Spanish Civil War, the ship torpedoed and sank the Republican 7,932-gross register ton (GRT) oil tanker SS Campeador off Ras el Mustafa, French Tunisia, on 11 August 1937.

== Bibliography ==
- Brescia, Maurizio (2012). Mussolini's Navy: A Reference Guide to the Regina Marina 1930–45. Annapolis, Maryland: Naval Institute Press. ISBN 978-1-59114-544-8.
- Fraccaroli, Aldo (1968). Italian Warships of World War II. Shepperton, UK: Ian Allan. ISBN 0-7110-0002-6.
- Frank, Willard C. Jr. (1989). "Question 12/88". Warship International. XXVI (1): 95–97. ISSN 0043-0374.
- Roberts, John (1980). "Italy". In Chesneau, Roger (ed.). Conway's All the World's Fighting Ships 1922–1946. New York: Mayflower Books. pp. 280–317. ISBN 0-8317-0303-2.
- Rohwer, Jürgen (2005). Chronology of the War at Sea 1939–1945: The Naval History of World War Two (Third Revised ed.). Annapolis, Maryland: Naval Institute Press. ISBN 1-59114-119-2.
- Whitley, M. J. (1988). Destroyers of World War 2: An International Encyclopedia. Annapolis, Maryland: Naval Institute Press. ISBN 1-85409-521-8.
