= Luigi Corsi =

Italian naval officer during World War II

- Born: 28 April 1898; La Spezia, Kingdom of Italy
- Died: 29 March 1941 (aged 42); Aegean Sea, off Cape Matapan
- Military career
- Allegiance: Kingdom of Italy
- Branch: Regia Marina
- Service years: 1916–1941
- Rank: Capitano di Vascello (Captain)
- Commands: Confienza (destroyer); Espero (destroyer); Amerigo Vespucci (training ship); Zara (heavy cruiser)
- Conflicts: World War I; Corfu crisis; Second Italo-Ethiopian War; World War II; Mediterranean War; Battle of Punta Stilo; Operation Hats; Battle of Taranto; Battle of Cape Matapan †
- Awards: Gold Medal of Military Valor (posthumous); War Cross for Military Valor; Order of the Crown of Italy

Luigi Corsi (La Spezia, 4 April 1898 – Aegean Sea, 29 March 1941) was an Italian naval officer during World War II.

== Biography ==
He was born in La Spezia on 4 April 1898, the son of a naval officer, and entered the Naval Academy of Livorno at a young age, being commissioned as ensign in 1916. He took part in the First World War on surface vessels, being promoted to sub-lieutenant in 1917 and to lieutenant in 1918. After the end of the war he assumed command of the destroyer Confienza, with which in 1923 he participated in the occupation of the island of Corfu during the crisis between Italy and Greece. After promotion to lieutenant commander, in 1932 he received the command of the destroyer Espero, with which he spent a period in China (from February to October 1932), protecting Italian citizens and interests during the Sino-Japanese conflict.

In 1933 he was promoted to commander, and during the Second Italo-Ethiopian War he held the position of Chief of Staff of the 1st Naval Squadron; after the end of the war he became deputy commander and director of studies of the Naval Academy, as well as commanding officer of the training ship Amerigo Vespucci from 17 June 1936 to 13 May 1937. In 1939 he was promoted to captain, and on 1 March 1940 he assumed command of the heavy cruiser Zara. At the command of his ship he took part in the battle of Punta Stilo, on 9 July 1940 (for which he was awarded a War Cross for Military Valor), as well as in convoy operations and in sorties against British operations Hats and MB. 5. Zara later became the flagship of the commander of the 1st Cruiser Division, Admiral Carlo Cattaneo, and in this capacity took part in the battle of Cape Matapan.

== Death ==
During the battle, in the night between 28 and 29 March 1941, Zara's sistership Pola was disabled by a torpedo dropped by a torpedo bomber, and the 1st Cruiser Division was ordered back to her assistance, thus running into the battleships of Admiral Andrew Browne Cunningham's Mediterranean Fleet. Before being able to react, Zara was hit by fifteen broadsides from HMS Valiant, HMS Warspite and HMS Barham and turned into a floating wreck, with her rudder, engines and armament disabled and much of her crew killed or wounded. Corsi and Cattaneo, who had both remained unscathed, discussed what to do and came to the conclusion that the ship had to be scuttled. They therefore gathered the crew on the stern, where Cattaneo announced his decision, and Corsi ordered a final cheer and then gave the order to abandon ship. As squads of volunteers opened the seacocks and prepared to blow up the ship's magazines, Zara was hit by a torpedo fired by HMS Jervis and sank after a violent explosion. Corsi was not among the survivors; conflicting accounts exist on his fate, one claiming that he retired to the chartroom and went down with the ship, another that he abandoned the ship with the last of the crew as she went down, having refused a place on a raft, and was never seen again. He was posthumously awarded the Gold Medal of Military Valor.

== See also ==
- List of people who disappeared mysteriously at sea
