= Carlo Cattaneo (disambiguation) =

Carlo Cattaneo was an Italian philosopher, writer, and activist.

Carlo Cattaneo may also refer to:

- Carlo Cattaneo (admiral), Italian admiral during World War II
- Carlo Cattaneo (mathematician), Italian academic and one of the general relativity theorists and mathematical physicists
- University Carlo Cattaneo, university located in Castellanza, Italy
