= Battle of Cape Spartivento =

Naval battle during the Battle of the Mediterranean

- Part of the Battle of the Mediterranean of the Second World War
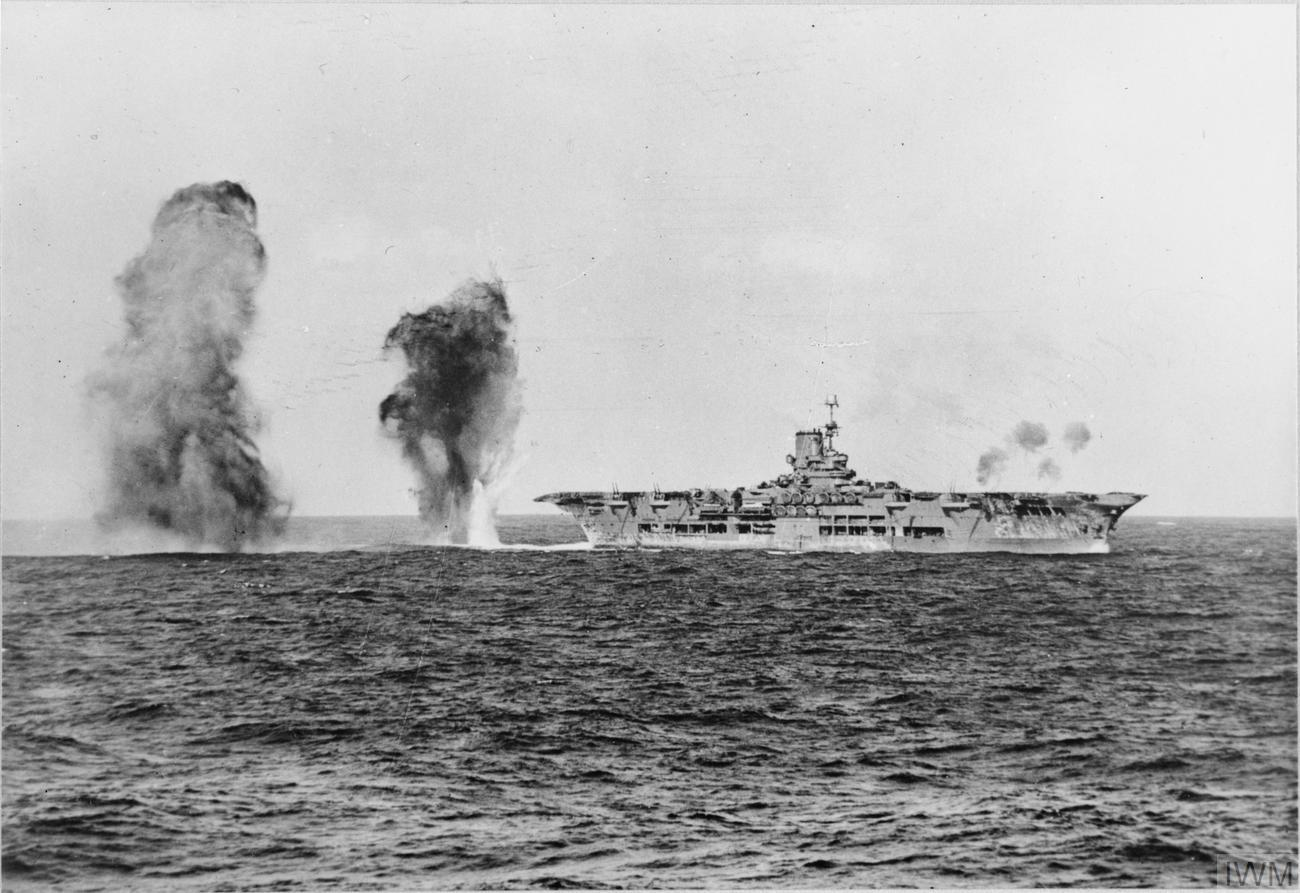
- Top: Italian heavy cruiser Bolzano during the battle Bottom: British aircraft carrier Ark Royal straddled by bombs
Date	27 November 1940
Location	Mediterranean Sea, near Sardinia, Italy 38°25′39″N 8°51′57″E
Result	Inconclusive

Belligerents
United Kingdom	Italy

Commanders and leaders
James Somerville; Lancelot Holland	Inigo Campioni; Angelo Iachino

Strength
1 carrier; 1 battleship; 1 battlecruiser; 1 heavy cruiser; 5 light cruisers; 1 anti-aircraft cruiser; 15 destroyers; 4 corvettes; 3 freighters	2 battleships; 6 heavy cruisers; 14 destroyers

Casualties and losses
7 killed; 1 heavy cruiser damaged; 1 light cruiser slightly damaged	2 killed; 1 destroyer damaged

The Battle of Cape Spartivento (Battaglia di Capo Teulada) was a naval battle during the Battle of the Mediterranean in the Second World War, fought between naval forces of the Royal Navy and the Italian Regia Marina on 27 November 1940.

== Background ==
=== Battle of Taranto ===
On the night of 11/12 November 1940, the British incapacitated or destroyed half of the battleships of the Italian fleet in a daring aerial assault as they lay at rest at Taranto. Until then, the Italians had mostly left their capital ships in harbour, hoping its mere presence as a fleet in being would deter British shipping through the area, though they would not decline battle if given the opportunity.

=== Operation White ===
Six days later, on the night of 17 November, an Italian force consisting of two battleships (Vittorio Veneto and Giulio Cesare) and a number of supporting units attempted to intercept two British aircraft carriers, HMS Ark Royal and Argus and their cruiser escorts, that were en route to Malta to ferry aeroplanes to reinforce its defences (Operation White). The British were warned of their approach and immediately turned about and returned to Gibraltar, launching their aircraft (two Skuas and 12 Hurricanes) prematurely. One Skua and eight Hurricanes ran out of fuel and crashed into the sea, with the loss of seven airmen.

=== Operation Collar ===
The Italian success in disrupting the reinforcement of Malta cast serious doubt upon British plans to send a further convoy to supply the island. The convoy was attempted, with increased support, including Force H from Gibraltar and Force D from Alexandria. The convoy was spotted by the Italian intelligence service and the Italian fleet sailed to intercept it. The first Italian naval unit to make visual contact with the convoy was the torpedo boat Sirio on the night of 26/27 November. After launching two torpedoes from long range, that missed, Sirio reported seven British warships heading eastwards.

== Battle ==
The British knew of the Italian fleet's movements and sent their forces north to intercept them, before they could close on the freighters. At 09:45 on 27 November, an IMAM Ro.43 reconnaissance floatplane from the heavy cruiser Bolzano discovered a British squadron steaming to the east, 17 nmi (31 km; 20 mi) north of Chetaïbi. At 9:56, Vice-Admiral James Somerville received a report from the carrier Ark Royal about the presence of five cruisers and five destroyers and assumed that these were Italian units closing for battle. Force D had not arrived from Alexandria and the British were outgunned but 15 minutes later, Force D was spotted and the tables turned. The Italian ships possessed larger and longer-ranged guns but the British had an aircraft carrier, which had shown several advantages over the battleships at Taranto. Squadron Admiral Inigo Campioni had been given orders to avoid combat unless it was in his favour, making a decisive battle unlikely.

Somerville deployed his forces into two main groups, with five cruisers (Vice-Admiral Lancelot Holland) in front and two battleships and seven destroyers in a second group following to the south. Further to the south, Ark Royal was preparing to launch its Swordfish. The Italians had organised their fleet into three groups, two composed of the six heavy cruisers and seven of the destroyers and a third group of the two battleships and another seven escorting destroyers bringing up the rear. At 12:07, after a report received from the cruiser Gorizia's floatplane, Campioni realized the closeness in strengths of the two forces and in accordance with his orders commanded the cruiser groups to re-form on the battleships and prepare to depart. By this point, the lead cruiser formation had already angled toward the British and was beginning to engage them in battle.

At 12:22, the lead groups of both cruiser forces came into range and Fiume opened fire at 23,500 m (77,100 ft). Fire was exchanged as the distance between them closed, but as the range shortened Italian firepower began to put pressure on the outgunned British. The arrival of the battleship HMS Ramillies on the British side helped to even the odds but she was too slow to maintain formation and dropped out of battle after a few salvoes at 12:26. Four minutes later, Squadron Admiral Angelo Iachino, commander of the Italian cruiser group, received orders to disengage, although the battle had swung slightly in their favour. Iachino ordered an increase in speed to 30 kn (56 km/h; 35 mph), laid smoke and started to withdraw.

The Italian destroyer Lanciere was hit by a broadside from HMS Manchester and seriously damaged, although she was towed to port after the battle. The heavy cruiser HMS Berwick was hit at 12:22 by a 203 mm (8.0 in) shell, which knocked out "Y" turret, killed seven men, wounded nine others and ignited a fire that took an hour to subdue. A second hit at 12:35 destroyed the after breaker (electrical switchboard) room and cut power to the ship's aft section, including the remaining aft turret. Most sources believe that the first hit was scored by an Italian heavy cruiser from the 1º Cruiser Division, either from Fiume or Pola, The second round came from the 3º Cruiser Division, either from Trieste or Trento, at the time the only Italian warships within range.

HMS Southampton was also hit once, by either Gorizia, Fiume, Pola, Trieste or Trento; the shell hit her belt at about 18,000 m (59,000 ft) range. At around 12:40, eleven Swordfish from Ark Royal attacked Vittorio Veneto with torpedoes, but did not score any hits.

For the next few minutes, the tables turned in favour of the British when the battlecruiser HMS Renown closed the distance on the Italian cruisers and straddled Trieste with two salvoes, hitting it with splinters. At 13:00, Vittorio Veneto opened fire from 27,000 m (89,000 ft). Vittorio Veneto fired 19 rounds in seven salvoes from long range and that was enough for the outgunned British cruisers, which turned back at the fourth salvo. As giant water-spouts erupted around Berwick and Manchester, Holland ordered smoke and his ships fled south-east to close with Renown. Manchester was holed by splinters from Vittorio Veneto's rounds. Both forces withdrew, the battle lasting for 54 minutes and causing little damage to either side.

== Aftermath ==
=== Analysis ===
The official British naval historian, Stephen Roskill, wrote that the Italians had failed to intercept the convoy and the merchant ships of Operation Collar reached Malta and Alexandria unharmed. The Battle of Spartivento was indecisive and the failure of the torpedo bombers on Ark Royal to slow the Italian battle fleet as it withdrew confirmed the concerns Somerville had over their lack of training and inexperience. The cessation of the British pursuit led to Somerville being criticised at the Admiralty, the Prime Minister and the dispatch of a senior officer to chair a court of inquiry into Somerville's leadership, an underhand manoeuvre that was resented in the Mediterranean Fleet and Force H. Cunningham commanded another supply convoy to Malta during December and signalled that "the base was as effective as when war broke out and far better defended against air attack or invasion.

On the Italian side, the aftermath of Cape Spartivento pleased no-one, opinion in the Italian fleet was that it had fled before an inferior opponent, even if they had to face an aircraft carrier and that they had failed to pursue the fleeing opponent. Iachino described the battle as "a minor military episode with no decisive results". "Indeed, the action at Cape Teulada, if it was not a success on the strategic level, as the enemy achieved their objective, was truly a tactical success for us and left everyone with the impression that we could confidently measure ourselves against the enemy in a prolonged gun battle". Giorgerini wrote that while it is correct to acknowledge the British had a strategic success in the passage of the convoy and other ships through the Strait of Sicily, "I find that it takes a certain sense of humour to call that action 'a tactical success for us".

The directives issued by Supermarina to the senior commander at sea, requiring the navy to engage "if the situation was favourable" was too vague, contrary to the principle that a clear intent and the goal to be achieved should be communicated. Vagueness served only to paralyse Campioni's initiative. Giorgerini wrote that after the failure of the British torpedo attacks, it would have been possible to use the large ships to stop the convoy. Even though the political–strategic circumstances of Italy required that the opportunity to achieve a success at sea be taken; 27 November 1940 was a bad day for the Regia Marina. After the operation, Campioni was sacked for timidity and replaced by Iachino and sent to the Dodecanese. Admiral Arturo Riccardi took over from Domenico Cavagnari at Supermarina as Chief of Staff of the Regia Marina. Henceforth, the Italian fleet was to operate with air cover, Aquila to be converted as a fighter aircraft carrier and other ships were to be mounted with catapult-launchers for fighters.

=== Casualties ===
The convoy element of Operation Collar neither suffered nor inflicted any casualties.

=== Subsequent events ===
The Italian battle fleet was reorganised as a battle squadron with Vittorio Veneto, Andrea Doria and Giulio Cesare commanded by Iachino, with the 13th destroyer flotilla commanded by Bruno Brivonesi, the three heavy cruisers and a destroyer flotilla commanded by Admiral Sansonetti, three light cruisers and two destroyer flotillas commanded by Admiral Antonio Legnani, three light cruisers and a destroyer flotilla commanded by Admiral Alberto Marenco di Moriondo and three more light cruisers and two destroyer flotillas commanded directly by Supermarina.

== Italian order of battle ==
=== Regia Marina ===
Italian ships
Ship	Flag	Type	Notes
1st Fleet, Squadron Admiral Inigo Campioni
Giulio Cesare	Kingdom of Italy	Conte di Cavour-class battleship	
Vittorio Veneto	Kingdom of Italy	Littorio-class battleship	Flag, Inigo Campioni
7th Destroyer Squadron
Dardo	Kingdom of Italy	Freccia-class destroyer	
Freccia	Kingdom of Italy	Freccia-class destroyer	
Saetta	Kingdom of Italy	Freccia-class destroyer	
13th Destroyer Squadron
Alpino	Kingdom of Italy	Soldati-class destroyer	
Bersagliere	Kingdom of Italy	Soldati-class destroyer	
Fuciliere	Kingdom of Italy	Soldati-class destroyer	
Granatiere	Kingdom of Italy	Soldati-class destroyer	
2nd Fleet, Squadron Admiral Angelo Iachino
1st (Heavy) Cruiser Division, Divisional Admiral Pellegrino Matteucci
Fiume	Kingdom of Italy	Zara-class cruiser	Flag
Gorizia	Kingdom of Italy	Zara-class cruiser	
Pola	Kingdom of Italy	Zara-class cruiser	Flag, Angelo Iachino
3rd (Heavy) Cruiser Division, Divisional Admiral Luigi Sansonetti
Bolzano	Kingdom of Italy	Heavy cruiser	
Trento	Kingdom of Italy	Trento-class cruiser	
Trieste	Kingdom of Italy	Trento-class cruiser	Flag
9th Destroyer Squadron
Vittorio Alfieri	Kingdom of Italy	Oriani-class destroyer	
Alfredo Oriani	Kingdom of Italy	Oriani-class destroyer	
Giosuè Carducci	Kingdom of Italy	Oriani-class destroyer	
Vincenzo Gioberti	Kingdom of Italy	Oriani-class destroyer	
12th Destroyer Squadron
Ascari	Kingdom of Italy	Soldati-class destroyer	
Carabiniere	Kingdom of Italy	Soldati-class destroyer	
Lanciere	Kingdom of Italy	Soldati-class destroyer	Damaged

== British order of battle ==
Force H
Ship	Flag	Type	Notes
Force B, Vice-Admiral James Somerville
HMS Renown	Royal Navy	Renown-class battlecruiser	
HMS Ark Royal	Royal Navy	Aircraft carrier	
HMS Sheffield	Royal Navy	Town-class cruiser	
HMS Despatch	Royal Navy	Danae-class cruiser	
HMS Duncan	Royal Navy	D-class destroyer	
HMS Encounter	Royal Navy	F-class destroyer	
HMS Faulknor	Royal Navy	F-class destroyer	
HMS Firedrake	Royal Navy	F-class destroyer	
HMS Forester	Royal Navy	F-class destroyer	
HMS Fury	Royal Navy	F-class destroyer	
HMS Jaguar	Royal Navy	J-class destroyer	
HMS Kelvin	Royal Navy	K-class destroyer	
HMS Wishart	Royal Navy	W-class destroyer	
Force F, Vice-Admiral Lancelot Holland
HMS Manchester	Royal Navy	Town-class cruiser	Minor damage
HMS Southampton	Royal Navy	Town-class cruiser	
HMS Hotspur	Royal Navy	H-class destroyer	
HMS Gloxinia	Royal Navy	Flower-class corvette	
HMS Hyacinth	Royal Navy	Flower-class corvette	
HMS Peony	Royal Navy	Flower-class corvette	
HMS Salvia	Royal Navy	Flower-class corvette	
C-in-C Mediterranean Fleet, Admiral (acting rank) Andrew Cunningham
Force D
HMS Ramillies	Royal Navy	Revenge-class battleship	
HMS Berwick	Royal Navy	County-class cruiser	Damaged
HMS Coventry	Royal Navy	C-class cruiser	
HMS Newcastle	Royal Navy	Town-class cruiser	
HMS Defender	Royal Navy	D-class destroyer	
HMS Greyhound	Royal Navy	G-class destroyer	
HMS Griffin	Royal Navy	G-class destroyer	
HMS Hereward	Royal Navy	H-class destroyer	
Force E
HMS Glasgow	Royal Navy	Town-class cruiser	Distant escort for Convoy MW 4
HMS Gloucester	Royal Navy	Town-class cruiser	Distant escort for Convoy MW 4
HMS York	Royal Navy	York-class cruiser	Distant escort for Convoy MW 4

=== Fleet Air Arm ===
FAA squadrons
NAS	Flag	Type	Notes
810 Naval Air Squadron	Royal Navy	Swordfish	12 aircraft
818 Naval Air Squadron	Royal Navy	Swordfish	9 aircraft
820 Naval Air Squadron	Royal Navy	Swordfish	9 aircraft
800 Naval Air Squadron	Royal Navy	Skua	12 aircraft
808 Naval Air Squadron	Royal Navy	Fulmar	12 aircraft

=== Convoys ===
==== Operation Collar ====
Operation Collar
Ship	Year	Flag	GRT	Notes
Clan Forbes	1938	Merchant Navy	7,529	To Malta
Clan Fraser	1939	Merchant Navy	7,529	To Malta
New Zealand Star	1935	Merchant Navy	10,941	To Alexandria

==== Convoy MW 4 ====
Alexandria to Malta
Ship	Year	Flag	GRT	Notes
Clan Ferguson	1938	Merchant Navy	7,347	
Clan Macaulay	1936	Merchant Navy	10,492	
Memnon	1930	Merchant Navy	7,506	
HMS Breconshire	1939	Royal Navy	9,776	

==== Convoy escorts ====
Escorts for Convoy MW 4
Ship	Flag	Type	Notes
HMS Hasty	Royal Navy	H-class destroyer	
HMS Havock	Royal Navy	H-class destroyer	
HMS Hero	Royal Navy	H-class destroyer	
HMS Hyperion	Royal Navy	H-class destroyer	
HMS Ilex	Royal Navy	I-class destroyer	
HMAS Vampire	Royal Navy	V-class destroyer	Escorted return convoy ME 4, 26–29 November
HMAS Vendetta	Royal Navy	V-class destroyer	Escorted return convoy ME 4, 26–29 November
HMAS Voyager	Royal Navy	W-class destroyer	Escorted return convoy ME 4, 26–30 November

=== Force E ===
Distant escorts for MW 4
Ship	Flag	Type	Notes
HMS Glasgow	Royal Navy	Town-class cruiser	
HMS Gloucester	Royal Navy	Town-class cruiser	
HMS York	Royal Navy	York-class cruiser	

=== Convoy MW 3/Convoy ME 4 ===
Unloaded Convoy MW 3 waiting at Malta as Convoy ME4
Ship	Year	Flag	GRT	Notes
SS Cornwall	1920	Merchant Navy	10,605	Bombed at Malta, to Alexandria for definitive repairs
RFA Plumleaf	1917	Merchant Navy	5,916	Malta to Alexandria
SS Rodi	1928	Merchant Navy	3,220	Ex-Italian, Malta to Alexandria
SS Volo	1928	Merchant Navy	1,587	Malta to Alexandria
MV Waiwera	1934	Merchant Navy	10,800	Malta to Alexandria
MV Devis	1938	Merchant Navy	6,054	Malta to Alexandria

=== ME 4 escorts ===
Escorts for ME 4
Ship	Flag	Type	Notes
From the Mediterranean Fleet
HMS Calcutta	Royal Navy	C-class cruiser	
HMAS Vampire	Royal Navy	V-class destroyer	
HMAS Vendetta	Royal Navy	V-class destroyer	
HMAS Voyager	Royal Navy	W-class destroyer	

== See also ==
- Jean Chiappe – High Commissioner of the Levant for Vichy France, died before taking office, thought to have died during the battle after the mail plane he was travelling in, called La Verrier, was shot down by mistake by the Italian Regia Aeronautica.

== Bibliography ==
- Bragadin, M. (1957) [1948]. Fioravanzo, G. (ed.). The Italian Navy in World War II. Translated by Hoffman, G. (Eng. trans. ed.). Annapolis, Maryland: United States Naval Institute. OCLC 602717421.
- De Toro, Augusto (1 December 2020). Storia Militare Briefing n. 24 dicembre 2020. Incrociatori pesanti Trento, Trieste e Bolzano. Italy: Storia Militare.
- Giorgerini, Giorgio (2001). La guerra italiana sul mare. La Marina tra vittoria e sconfitta 1940–1943 [The Italian War at Sea: The Navy between Victory and Defeat 1940–1943] (in Italian). Milano: Mondadori. ISBN 978-8-80-440581-8.
- Greene, Jack; Massignani, Alessandro (1998). The Naval War in the Mediterranean, 1940–1943. London: Chatham Publishing. ISBN 1-885119-61-5.
- Greene, Jack; Massignani, Alessandro (2002) [1998]. The Naval War in the Mediterranean, 1940–1943. Rochester: Chatham. ISBN 978-1-86176-057-9.
- Hague, Arnold (2000). The Allied Convoy System 1939–1945: It's Organization, Defence and Operation (hbk. repr. Chatham, London ed.). St. Catherine's, ONT: Vanwell Publishing. ISBN 978-1-55125-033-5.
- Hobbs, David (2013). British Aircraft Carriers: Design, Development and Service Histories. Barnsley: Seaforth Publishing. ISBN 978-1-84832-138-0.
- Jordan, Roger W. (2006) [1999]. The World's Merchant Fleets 1939: The Particulars and Wartime Fates of 6,000 Ships (2nd ed.). London: Chatham/Lionel Leventhal. ISBN 978-1-86176-293-1.
- Mattesini, Francesco (2000). La battaglia di Capo Teulada: 27−28 novembre 1940 (in Italian). Ufficio storico della Marina Militare. OCLC 50182392.
- O'Hara, Vincent P. (2009). Struggle for the Middle Sea. Annapolis, MD: Naval Institute Press. ISBN 978-1-59114-648-3.
- Rohwer, Jürgen; Hümmelchen, Gerhard (2005). Chronology of the War at Sea 1939–1945: The Naval History of World War Two (3rd rev. ed.). Annapolis, Maryland: Naval Institute Press. ISBN 1-59114-119-2.
- Roskill, S. W. (1957) [1954]. Butler, J. R. M. (ed.). The War at Sea 1939–1945: The Defensive. History of the Second World War United Kingdom Military Series. Vol. I (4th impr. ed.). London: HMSO. OCLC 881709135. Archived from the original on 27 February 2022.
- Shores, Christopher; Cull, Brian; Malizia, Nicola (1999). Malta: The Hurricane Years (1940–41). London: Grub Street. ISBN 0-948817-06-2.
- Smith, Peter C. (2011). Critical Conflict: The Royal Navy's Mediterranean Campaign in 1940. Barnsley: Pen & Sword Aviation. ISBN 978-1-84884-513-8. First published as Action Imminent: Three Studies of the Naval War in the Mediterranean Theatre during 1940 (1980) William Kimber, London. ISBN 978-0-7183-0277-1
- Stern, Robert C. (2015). Big Gun Battles: Warship Duels of the Second World War. London: Seaforth Publishing. ISBN 1-4738-4969-1.
- Woodman, Richard (2003). Malta Convoys 1940–1943. London: John Murray. ISBN 978-0-7195-6408-6.
