= Italian cruiser Zara =

Heavy cruiser of the Italian Royal Navy

Coordinates: 35°20′N 20°57′E

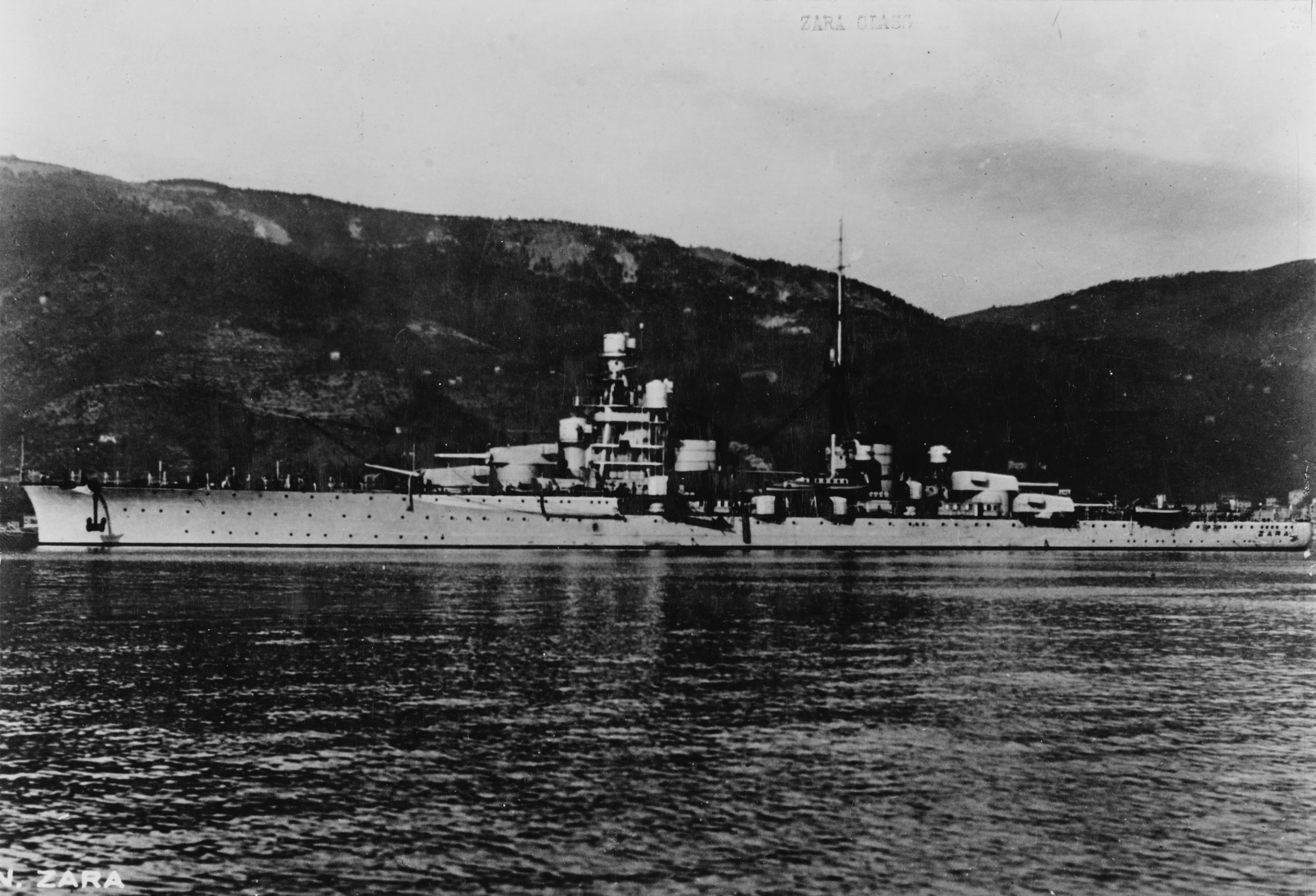

History

Italy
- Name: Zara
- Builder: Odero Terni Orlando, Muggiano
- Laid down: 4 July 1929
- Launched: 27 April 1930
- Commissioned: 20 October 1931
- Fate: Sunk, 29 March 1941

General characteristics
- Class & type: Zara-class cruiser
- Displacement: Standard: 11,680 long tons (11,867 t); Full load: 14,300 long tons (14,529 t)
- Length: 182.8 m (599 ft 9 in)
- Beam: 20.6 m (67 ft 7 in)
- Draft: 7.2 m (23 ft 7 in)
- Installed power: 95,000 shp (71,000 kW); 8 × 3-drum Thornycroft boilers
- Propulsion: 2 × Parsons steam turbines; 2 × screw propellers
- Speed: 33 knots (61 km/h; 38 mph)
- Range: 5,361 nmi (9,929 km; 6,169 mi) at 16 knots (30 km/h; 18 mph)
- Complement: 841
- Armament: 8 × 203 mm (8 in)/53 cal. guns; 16 × 100 mm (4 in) / 47 caliber guns; 6 × Vickers-Terni 40 mm/39 guns; 8 × 13.2 mm machine guns
- Armor: Deck: 70 mm (2.8 in); Belt: 150 mm (5.9 in); Turret faces: 150 mm; Barbettes: 150 mm
- Aircraft carried: 2

Zara was a heavy cruiser built for the Italian Regia Marina (Royal Navy), the lead ship of the Zara class. Named after the Italian city of Zara (now Zadar, Croatia), the ship was built at the Odero-Terni-Orlando shipyard beginning with her keel laying in July 1928, launching in April 1930, and commissioning in October 1931. Armed with a main battery of eight 8-inch (200 mm) guns, she was nominally within the 10,000-long-ton (10,000 t) limit imposed by the Washington Naval Treaty, though in reality she significantly exceeded this figure.

Zara saw extensive service during the first two years of Italy's participation in World War II, having taken part in several sorties to catch British convoys in the Mediterranean as the flagship of the 1st Division. She was present during the Battle of Calabria in July 1940, the Battle of Taranto in November 1940, and the Battle of Cape Matapan in March 1941. In the last engagement, Zara and her sister ships Fiume and Pola were sunk in a close-range night engagement with three British battleships. Most of her crew, 783 officers and sailors, including the divisional commander Admiral Carlo Cattaneo and the ship's commanding officer Luigi Corsi, were killed in the sinking.

== Design ==
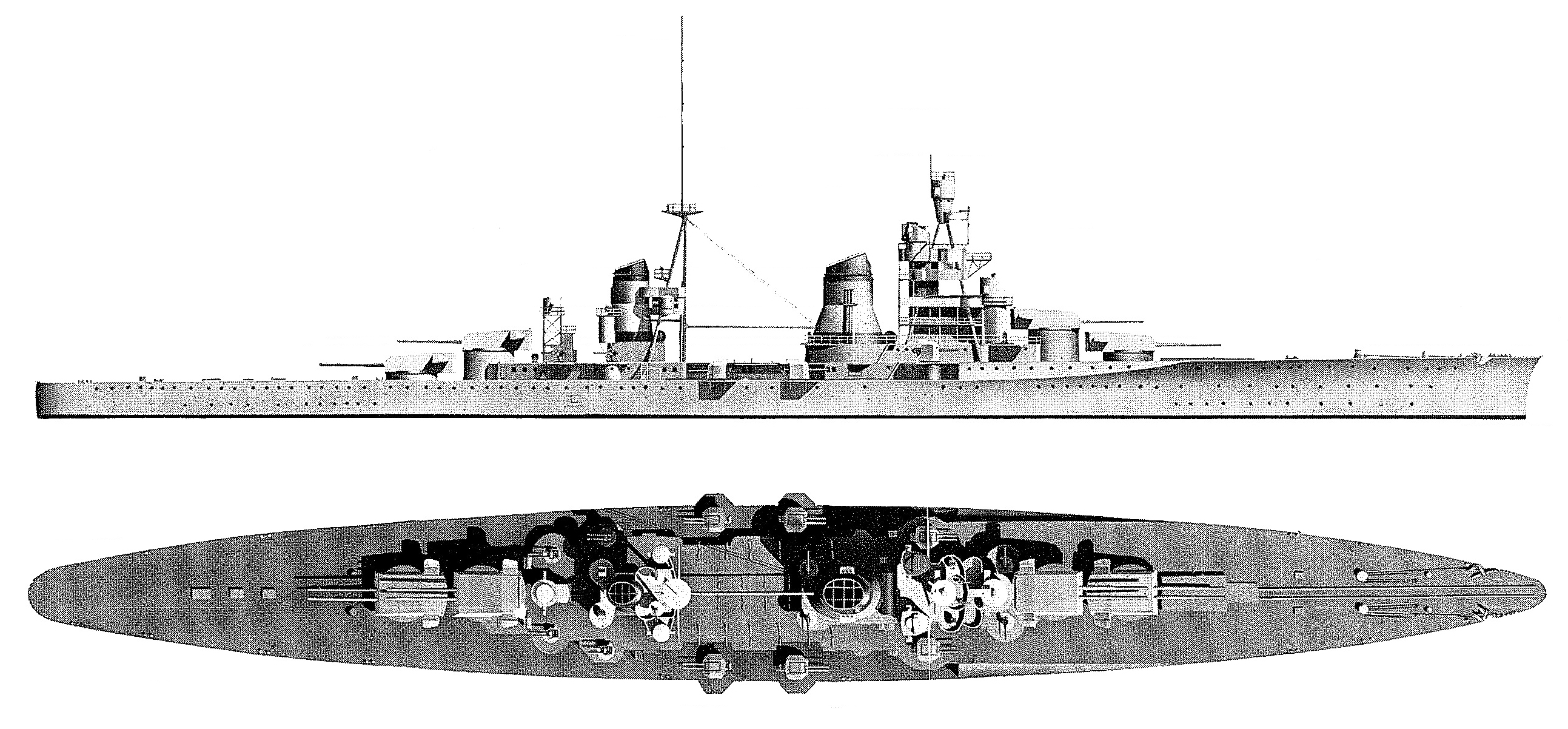
Profile and plan drawing of the Zara class

Zara was 182.8 meters (600 ft) long overall, with a beam of 20.62 m (67.7 ft) and a draft of 7.2 m (24 ft). She displaced 14,300 long tons (14,500 t) at full load, though her displacement was nominally within the 10,000-long-ton (10,000 t) restriction set in place by the Washington Naval Treaty. Her power plant consisted of two Parsons steam turbines powered by eight oil-fired Yarrow boilers, which were trunked into two funnels amidships. Her engines were rated at 95,000 shaft horsepower (71,000 kW) and produced a top speed of 32 knots (59 km/h; 37 mph). She had a crew of 841 officers and enlisted men.

She was protected with an armor belt that was 150 mm (5.9 in) thick amidships. Her main deck was 70 mm (2.8 in) thick and there was a secondary deck 20 mm (0.79 in) thick over the main one. The gun turrets had 150 mm thick plating on the faces and the barbettes they sat in were also 150 mm thick. The main conning tower had 150 mm thick sides.

Zara was armed with a main battery of eight 203 mm (8 in) Mod 29 53-caliber guns in four gun turrets. The turrets were arranged in superfiring pairs forward and aft. Anti-aircraft defense was provided by a battery of sixteen 100 mm (4 in) 47-cal. guns in twin mounts, four Vickers-Terni 40 mm/39 guns in single mounts and eight 12.7 mm (0.50 in) guns in twin mounts. She carried a pair of IMAM Ro.43 seaplanes for aerial reconnaissance; the hangar was located in under the forecastle and a fixed catapult was mounted on the centerline at the bow.

Zara's secondary battery was revised several times during her career. Two of the 100 mm guns and all of the 40 mm and 12.7 mm guns were removed in the late 1930s, and eight 37 mm (1.5 in) 54-cal. guns and eight 13.2 mm (0.52 in) guns were installed in their place. Two 120 mm (4.7 in) 15-cal. star shell guns were added in 1940.

== Service history ==
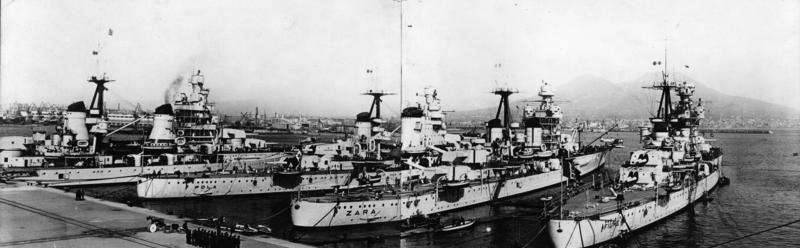
Zara (second from right) along with Fiume and Pola in Naples

Zara's keel was laid down on 4 July 1928 at the Odero-Terni-Orlando (OTO) shipyard at Muggiano, La Spezia; she was launched on 27 April 1930, and her construction was completed on 20 October 1931, when she was commissioned into active service. During sea trials, Zara reached a speed of 35.23 kn (65.25 km/h; 40.54 mph), but this was with the ship's machinery forced to give 120,690 shp (90,000 kW). This was not representative of in-service performance, however, and normal maximum at-sea speed was about 29 kn (54 km/h; 33 mph). (Note: Constructors trials were carried out with the ship's engines forced to such an extreme amount as the Italian Government paid a bonus to shipbuilders for every knot of speed in excess of contracted speed. This process was stopped after the trials of Gorizia, the third of the Zara class.) The ship was presented with her battle flag in her namesake city, now Zadar, Croatia.

In August 1932, Zara took part in fleet training exercises in the Gulf of Naples; King Victor Emmanuel III came aboard the ship on the 13th. She became the flagship of the First Naval Squadron in September. She took part in a naval review held for Benito Mussolini in the Gulf of Naples on 6–7 July 1933. Zara participated in another review on 27 November 1936, and Victor Emmanuel III, his son Umberto, Prince of Piedmont, Mussolini, and the Regent of Hungary, Miklós Horthy, all came aboard the ship. Another fleet review was held for the German Field Marshal Werner von Blomberg, the German minister of defense, on 7 June 1937. On 16 September, the commander of the squadron transferred his flag to the battleship Conte di Cavour. A final peacetime naval review took place on 5 May 1938, held for the visit of Adolf Hitler.

On 7 March 1939, Zara and her sister ships sortied from Taranto to intercept a squadron of Republican warships—three cruisers and eight destroyers—attempting to reach the Black Sea. The Italian ships were ordered not to open fire but merely to try to impede the progress of the Spanish ships and force them to dock at Augusta, Sicily. The Spanish commander refused and instead steamed to Bizerte in French Tunisia, where his ships were interned. A month later, from 7 to 9 April, Zara supported the Italian invasion of Albania without incident. She was in port in Genoa for Navy Day on 10 June; she spent the rest of 1939 uneventfully.

=== World War II ===
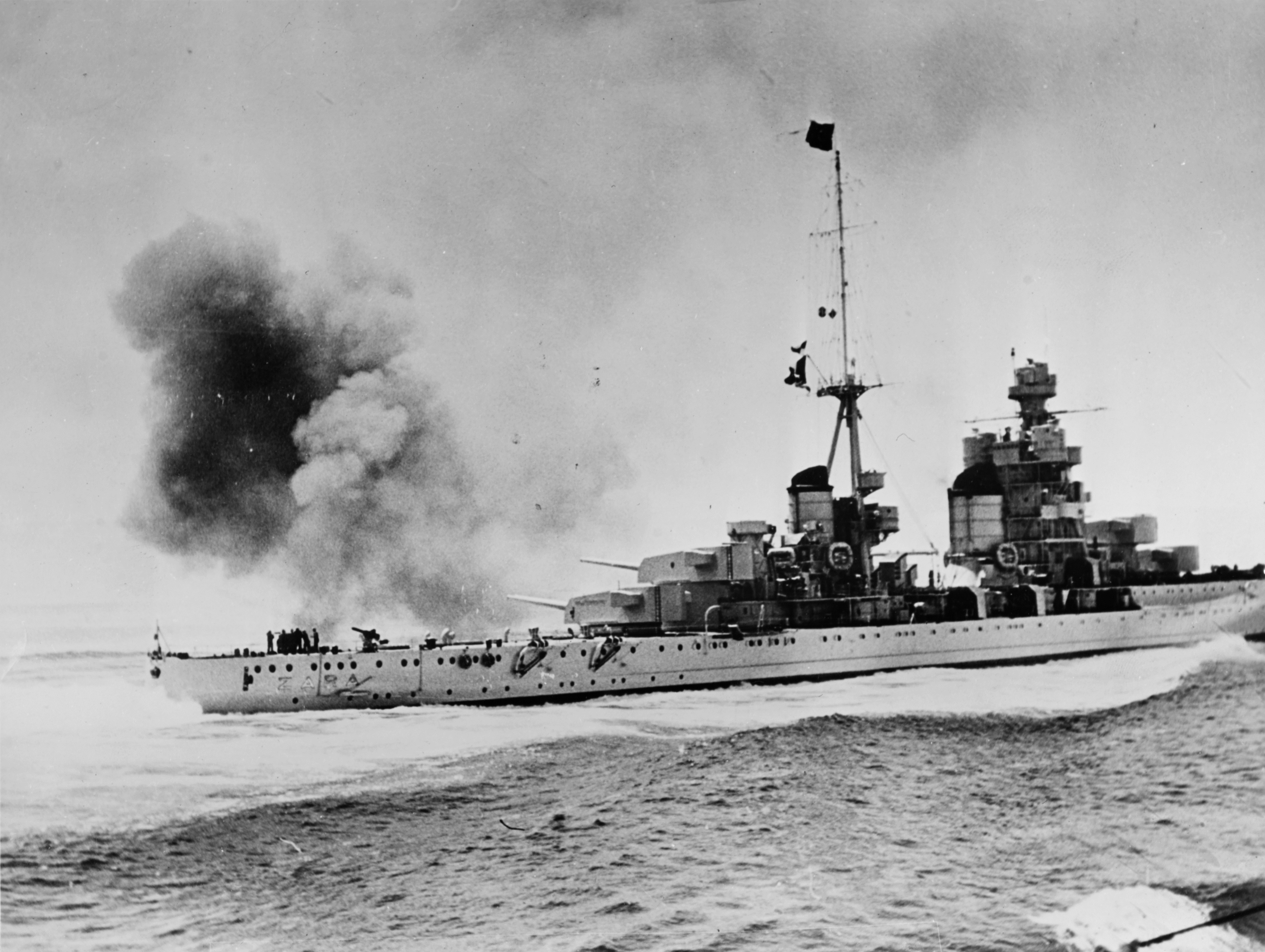
Zara on gunnery exercises in 1938

At Italy's entrance into the Second World War on 10 June 1940, Zara was assigned to the 1st Division of the 1st Squadron, as the flagship of Rear Admiral Matteucci. The division also included her sisters Gorizia and Fiume and the four Oriani-class destroyers. At the time, the division was based in Taranto; the ships were immediately sent to patrol off the island of Crete, and on 11–12 June, the ships were attacked by an unknown submarine, which the destroyers unsuccessfully counterattacked. On 21 June, Zara and the rest of the division were transferred to Augusta, Sicily to be better positioned to intercept Allied convoys in the Mediterranean. The following day, the 1st Division joined a patrol with the 2nd and 3rd Divisions, though they failed to find any Allied vessels. Zara was present at the Battle of Calabria on 9 July. On 30 July, the 1st Division escorted a convoy to Benghazi and Tripoli in Italian Libya, arriving back in Augusta on 1 August. Gunnery training off Naples followed on 16 August, and on 29 August the ships left Naples for Taranto, arriving the next day. On the 31st, the 1st Division sortied to intercept the British convoys in Operation Hats, though the Italian fleet broke off the attack without encountering the merchant ships.

Zara returned to Taranto, and was present during the Battle of Taranto on the night of 11–12 November. She was undamaged during the British attack. In the aftermath of the attack, the Italian command decided to disperse the fleet to protect them from further attacks; Zara was sent to La Spezia for periodic maintenance on the 12th. The work lasted until 9 December, and she steamed south to Naples the following day. British bombing of the port four days later forced the Italians to again relocate the cruisers, sending them first to La Maddalena in Sardinia on 15 December and then back to Naples on the 19th. They stayed there for three days before proceeding to Taranto on 22 December. That month, Admiral Carlo Cattaneo came aboard Zara as the new commander of the division. Training exercises with Gorizia followed on 29 January and continued into the next month, when Pola joined them on 13 February. In mid March, Zara, Pola, and Fiume conducted gunnery training in the Gulf of Taranto. By this time, Pola had replaced Gorizia in the 1st Division.

==== Battle of Cape Matapan ====
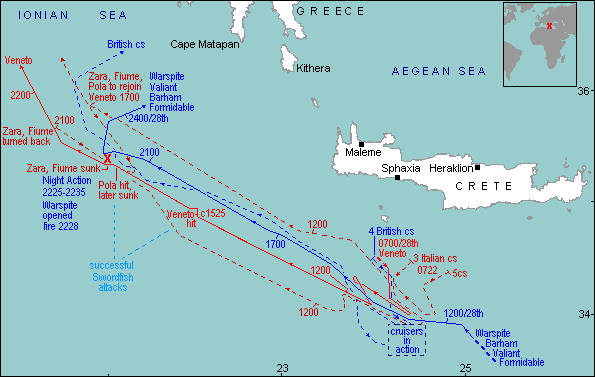
Map of the movements of the Italian and British fleets during the Battle of Cape Matapan

The Italian fleet made another attempt to intercept a British convoy in the eastern Mediterranean south of Crete in late March. This operation resulted in the Battle of Cape Matapan on 27–29 March. For most of the daytime engagement, Zara and the rest of the 1st Division were stationed on the disengaged side of the Italian fleet, and so did not see action during this phase. Vittorio Veneto was torpedoed by British aircraft from the carrier Formidable and was forced to withdraw, and the 1st Division remained on the port side of the Italian fleet to screen against another possible British attack. A second British airstrike later on the 28th failed to locate the retiring Vittorio Veneto and instead scored a single torpedo strike on Pola, hitting her amidships on her starboard side. In the confusion of the attack, Pola had nearly collided with Fiume and had been forced to stop, which had prevented her from taking evasive action. The damage filled three compartments with water and disabled five of her boilers and the main steam line that fed the turbines, leaving her immobilized.

Admiral Iachino, the fleet commander, was unaware of Pola's plight until 20:10; upon learning of the situation he detached Zara, Fiume, and four destroyers to protect Pola. At around the same time, the British cruiser HMS Orion detected Pola on her radar and reported her location. The British fleet, centered on the battleships Valiant, Warspite, and Barham, was at this point only 50 nmi (93 km; 58 mi) away. The British ships, guided by radar, closed in on the Italians; at 22:10, Pola was about 6 nautical miles (11 km; 6.9 mi) from Valiant. Lookouts on the crippled Italian cruiser spotted shapes approaching and assumed them to be friendly vessels, so they fired a red flare to guide them. Almost twenty minutes later, the British illuminated first Zara and then Fiume with their searchlights; the British battleships obliterated Zara, Fiume, and two destroyers in a point-blank engagement. Zara had been hit by four broadsides from Warspite and five more from Valiant in the span of just a few minutes. The destroyer HMAS Stuart launched torpedoes at the crippled Zara and scored at least one hit. The destroyer Havock launched four more torpedoes with unknown results.

The British battleships then turned away to avoid a torpedo attack from the remaining destroyers. Zara, by now burning furiously, remained afloat and drifted near the immobilized Pola. Zara's commander decided at 02:00 that his ship could not be saved, and so ordered the crew to scuttle the ship. At around the same time, the destroyer Jervis arrived on the scene and fired three torpedoes at Zara. The demolition charges exploded in the magazines at 02:30, and within ten minutes, the ship capsized and sank. Most of her crew, some 783 men including Cattaneo, were killed in the sinking. Zara was formally stricken from the naval register on 18 October 1946.
