= Carlo Cattaneo (admiral) =

Italian admiral

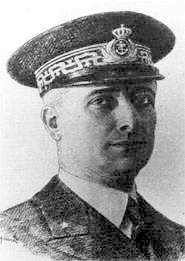
- Born: 6 October 1883; Sant'Anastasia, Campania, Italy
- Died: 29 March 1941 (aged 57); Aegean Sea
- Military career
- Allegiance: Kingdom of Italy
- Branch: Regia Marina
- Service years: 1902–1941
- Rank: Ammiraglio di Divisione (Vice Admiral)
- Commands: Orsa (torpedo boat); Alberto Di Giussano (light cruiser); 3rd Naval Division; 6th Naval Division; 1st Naval Division
- Conflicts: Italo-Turkish War; World War I; Adriatic Campaign; World War II; Battle of the Mediterranean; Battle of Calabria; Battle of Taranto; Battle of Cape Matapan †
- Awards: Bronze Medal of Military Valor; Silver Medal of Military Valor (three times); Gold Medal of Military Valor (posthumous)

Carlo Cattaneo (6 October 1883 – 29 March 1941) was an Italian admiral during World War II. He was killed in the Battle of Cape Matapan.

== Early life and career ==
Cattaneo was born in Sant'Anastasia, Naples, in 1883, and after attending the Naples Military College he entered the Italian Naval Academy at Livorno in 1902; he graduated in 1906, becoming an ensign.

He joined the crew of the battleship Ammiraglio di Saint Bon, with which he took part in the rescue operations after the 1908 Messina earthquake. After becoming a sub-lieutenant, he served on the battleship Regina Elena.

He took part in the Italo-Turkish War as commanding officer of a landing party which participated in the occupation of Tripoli; for this action, he was awarded a Silver Medal of Military Valor. In 1913 he was promoted to lieutenant, and during World War I he commanded the torpedo boat Orsa, which served intensely in the southern Adriatic Sea, gaining a Bronze Medal of Military Valor in July 1915, and later he served on board destroyers, including Carabiniere. In 1919 he was awarded a second Silver Medal.

In January 1920, he was appointed Naval Attaché in Constantinople and later in the same year he was promoted to lieutenant commander. In 1929, he served at the Ministry of the Navy, and later he was promoted to commander and appointed Naval Attaché first in Romania and later in Jugoslavia.

In 1932, he was promoted captain, commanding, between December 1933 and April 1935, the light cruiser Di Giussano. In 1937 he became rear admiral (Contrammiraglio) and in March 1938 he was promoted vice admiral (Ammiraglio di divisione).

== World War II ==
After the beginning of World War II, on 26 May 1940, Cattaneo became commander of the 3rd Naval Division, with flag on the heavy cruiser Trento. He took part in this role in the Battle of Calabria on 9 July 1940, after which he was awarded the Silver Medal of Military Valour for the third time.

On 30 August 1940 Cattaneo was appointed commander of the 6th Naval Division, with flag on the battleship Duilio, and on 16 December of the same year (after Duilio had been damaged by the raid on Taranto and the Italian battle fleet had been re-organized) he became commander of the 1st Naval Division, with Zara as flagship.

In this role, Cattaneo took part in the Battle of Cape Matapan on 27–29 March 1941. Having been initially ordered to carry out a raid against shipping north of Crete, together with the 8th Naval Division of Admiral Antonio Legnani (who was subordinate to him), Cattaneo subsequently received order to abort the raid and join forces with the main force of Admiral Angelo Iachino, with the battleship Vittorio Veneto and the 3rd Naval Division of Admiral Luigi Sansonetti. Cattaneo's force did not manage to reach Iachino's squadron in time for joining the first engagement against the light cruisers of British Admiral Henry Pridham-Wippell, which took place off Gavdos in the morning of 27 March.

The reunion happened shortly after the action off Gavdos had ended. During the afternoon, Cattaneo's ships, like the rest of the Italian squadron, were repeatedly attacked by British planes but suffered no damage. After the Vittorio Veneto was torpedoed and damaged at 15.09, Cattaneo was ordered to form with his ships (the heavy cruisers Zara, Pola and Fiume and the destroyer Vittorio Alfieri, Alfredo Oriani, Vincenzo Gioberti and Giosuè Carducci of the 9th Destroyer Squadron) a line to the port of the damaged battleships, to protect her from further air strikes. At 19.50, a new torpedo bomber attack left Pola dead in the water. Cattaneo proposed that Iachino send two destroyers to her rescue, but Iachino instead ordered him to go back to assist Pola with the entire 1st Division and the 9th Destroyer Squadron. After some hesitation, Cattaneo turned back with his ships to assist Pola at 21.06. In a decision that would be strongly criticised afterwards, Cattaneo kept the four destroyers of the 9th Squadron astern of his cruisers, instead of ahead of them, which would have been more logical and safe, by creating a destroyer screen for his cruisers sailing in the night while their fleet was probably being pursued by enemy ships. Later research, however, revealed that this tactical fault was not due to a mistake made by Cattaneo, but to the Italian Navy rules on night navigation, which were in force at the time. Cattaneo was also criticised for the low speed at which he sailed his ships (16 to 22 knots); this was later explained with the destroyers being low on fuel. No explanation has ever been found for his decision to leave his ships' guns unmanned as they steamed into a hostile night.

Cattaneo's ships reached Pola at 22.20, but meanwhile, unknowingly to him, also Force A of the Mediterranean Fleet, with the battleships Barham, Valiant and Warspite under the command of Admiral Andrew Browne Cunningham, had reached the area. The British battleships were about to open fire on Pola when they spotted the approaching ships of the 1st Division: without being noticed by the Italian ships, they switched target and opened fire at point blank range (3,500 meters) against Cattaneo's ships, which were taken by surprise. In the ensuing fire action, which lasted five minutes, all of Cattaneo's ships, with the exception of Gioberti, were hit; only Alfieri was able to fight back before being disabled. Gioberti and the damaged Oriani managed to retreat, but all the other ships, including Pola, either sank or were finished off by British destroyers. Cattaneo's flagship, Zara, was hit by four 381 mm salvoes from Warspite, five from Barham and five from Valiant. The hits immediately destroyed the 203 mm turrets before they could be readied to fire, started fires aboard, killed or wounded many crewmembers, disabled the engines and within a few minutes left the cruiser without power and dead in the water. Zara was reduced to a drifting wreck, but her hull had suffered no fatal damage, so the cruiser floated for some hours. Finally, Cattaneo decided to scuttle the ship, fearing that it would otherwise fall into enemy hands; he gathered the surviving crew on the stern and announced his decision. As the crew abandoned the ship by jumping into the sea or lowering themselves down to the rafts, a small party of volunteers opened the seacocks and ignited the demolition charges placed in the cruiser's magazines. At the same time, HMS Jervis came near and torpedoed Zara; the cruiser went down at 2.40 on 29 March, after a final large explosion. Admiral Cattaneo, who according to survivors had abandoned the ship without a lifejacket as he had given it to a wounded sailor, disappeared in the sea during the night, like most of Zara's crew. Over 2,300 Italian officers and seamen from the five ships perished in Italy's worst naval defeat. Admiral Cattaneo was posthumously awarded the Gold Medal of Military Valor.
