= Italian cruiser Gorizia =

Heavy cruiser of the Italian Royal Navy

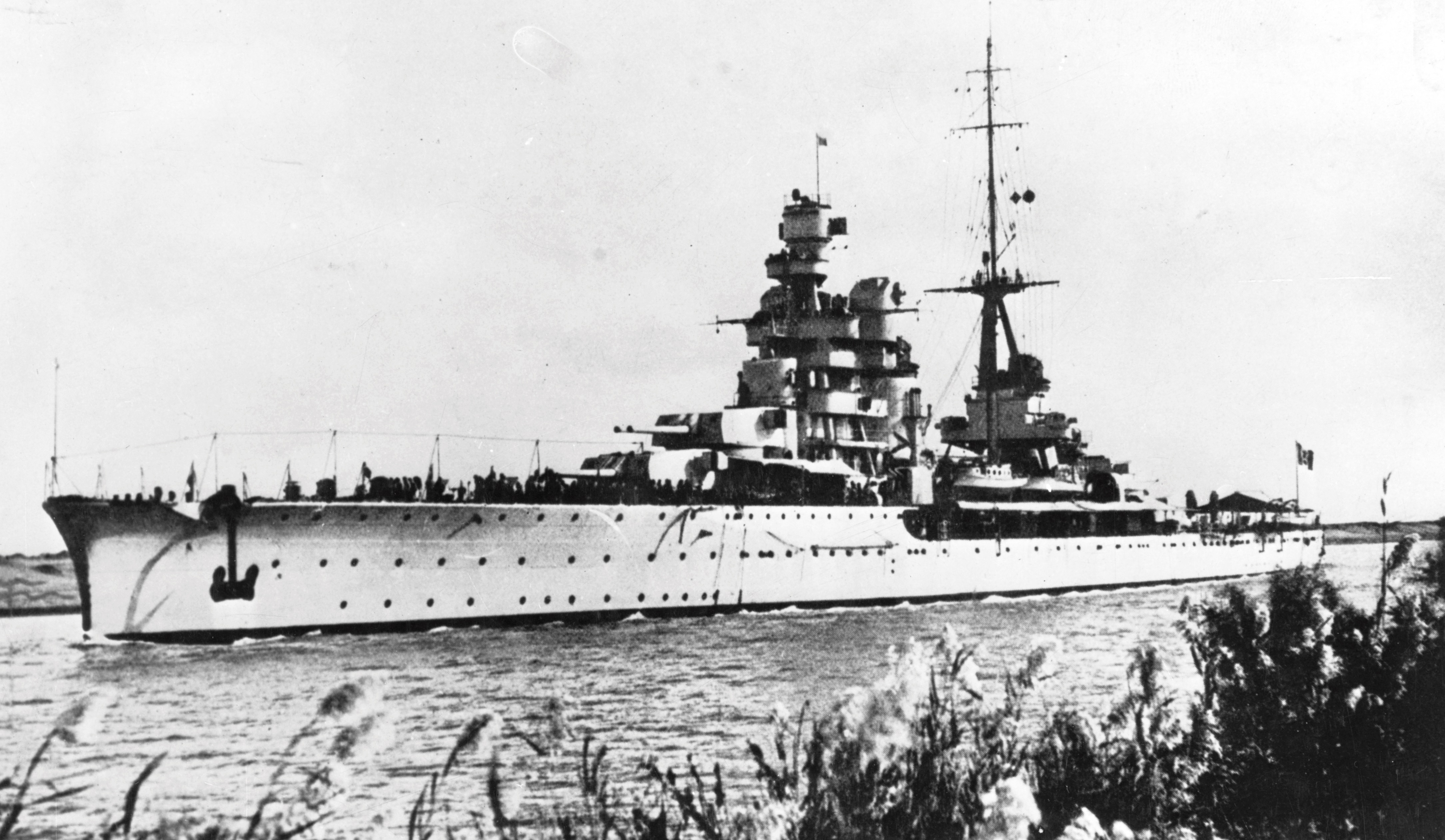
- Gorizia, date unknown

History

Italy
- Name: Gorizia
- Builder: O.T.O., Livorno
- Laid down: March 1930
- Launched: 28 December 1930
- Commissioned: 31 December 1931
- Fate: Disabled by manned torpedoes in 1944, scrapped in 1946

General characteristics
- Class & type: Zara-class cruiser
- Displacement: Standard: 11,712 long tons (11,900 t); Full load: 14,330 long tons (14,560 t)
- Length: 182.8 m (599 ft 9 in)
- Beam: 20.62 m (67 ft 8 in)
- Draft: 7.2 m (23 ft 7 in)
- Installed power: 8 three-drum Thornycroft boilers; 95,000 hp (71 MW)
- Propulsion: 2 Parsons turbines
- Speed: 32 knots (37 mph; 59 km/h)
- Complement: 841
- Armament: 8 × 203 mm (8 in)/53 cal. guns; 16 × 100 mm (4 in) / 47 caliber guns; 6 × Vickers-Terni 40 mm/39 guns; 8 × 13.2 mm (0.52 in) guns
- Armor: Deck: 70 mm (2.8 in); Belt: 150 mm (5.9 in); Turret faces: 150 mm; Barbettes: 150 mm
- Aircraft carried: 2 seaplanes

Gorizia was the third member of the Zara class of heavy cruisers to be built for the Italian Regia Marina (Royal Navy) in the 1930s. Named for the town of Gorizia, the ship was laid down at the OTO Livorno shipyard in March 1930, was launched in December that year and was commissioned into the fleet in December 1931. Armed with a main battery of eight 8-inch (200 mm) guns, she was nominally within the 10,000-long-ton (10,000 t) limit imposed by the Washington Naval Treaty, though in reality she significantly exceeded this figure.

During the ship's peacetime career, she frequently took part in fleet reviews. In 1934, she went on a tour with the royal yacht to eastern Africa, and she made another foreign cruise two years later to Germany during the 1936 Summer Olympics being held there. She was involved in the Spanish Civil War in the late 1930s; she evacuated Italian nationals in August 1936, and while returning to Italy, suffered an explosion in an aviation gas tank that necessitated major repairs. The ship supported the Italian invasion of Albania in 1939.

The ship saw extensive service in World War II, which Italy entered in June 1940. She frequently operated against British convoys to Malta in the Mediterranean, and after the North African Campaign began, she escorted Italian convoys to support the Italo-German forces fighting there. In the course of these operations, she took part in the battles at Calabria, Cape Spartivento, and First and Second Sirte. Gorizia was also attacked numerous times by Allied bombers while in port, culminating in a major raid in April 1943 that inflicted serious damage to the ship. Under repair when Italy surrendered to the Allies in September, the ship was seized by occupying Germany forces, who found the ship to be unusable and so abandoned her. Italian and British frogmen tried unsuccessfully to sink the ship in 1944. After Germany's defeat in 1945, the Italian Navy determined the ship was beyond economical repair, and so she was broken up for scrap in 1947.

== Design ==
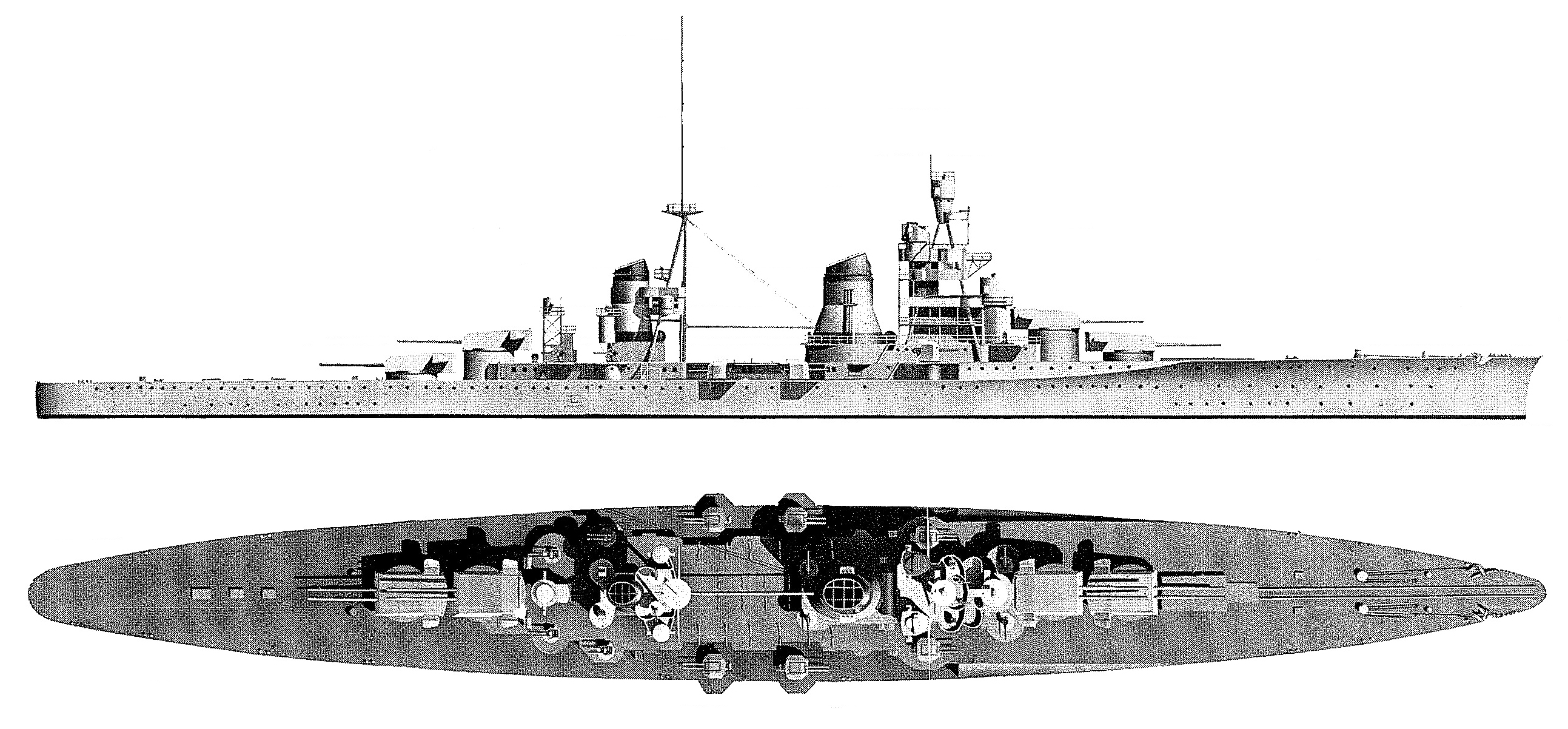
Profile and plan drawing of the Zara class

Gorizia was 182.8 meters (600 ft) long overall, with a beam of 20.62 m (67.7 ft) and a draft of 7.2 m (24 ft). She displaced 14,330 long tons (14,560 t) at full load, though her displacement was nominally within the 10,000-long-ton (10,000 t) restriction set in place by the Washington Naval Treaty. Her power plant consisted of two Parsons steam turbines powered by eight oil-fired Yarrow boilers, which were trunked into two funnels amidships. Her engines were rated at 95,000 shaft horsepower (71,000 kW) and produced a top speed of 32 knots (59 km/h; 37 mph). She had a crew of 841 officers and enlisted men.

She was protected with an armor belt that was 150 mm (5.9 in) thick amidships. Her armor deck was 70 mm (2.8 in) thick in the central portion of the ship and reduced to 20 mm (0.79 in) at either end. The gun turrets had 150 mm thick plating on the faces and the barbettes they sat in were also 150 mm thick. The main conning tower had 150 mm thick sides.

Gorizia was armed with a main battery of eight 203 mm (8 in) Mod 29 53-caliber guns in four gun turrets. The turrets were arranged in superfiring pairs forward and aft. Anti-aircraft defense was provided by a battery of sixteen 100 mm (4 in) 47-cal. guns in twin mounts, four Vickers-Terni 40 mm/39 guns in single mounts and eight 12.7 mm (0.50 in) guns in twin mounts. She carried a pair of IMAM Ro.43 seaplanes for aerial reconnaissance; the hangar was located in under the forecastle and a fixed catapult was mounted on the centerline at the bow.

Gorizia's secondary battery was revised several times during her career. Two of the 100 mm guns and all of the 40 mm and 12.7 mm guns were removed in the late 1930s and eight 37 mm (1.5 in) 54-cal. guns and eight 13.2 mm (0.52 in) guns were installed in their place. Two 120 mm (4.7 in) 15-cal. star shell guns were added in 1940. In 1942, the star shell guns were replaced with four more 37 mm guns. The following year, a battery of fourteen 20 mm (0.79 in) guns in six twin and two single mounts replaced the 13.2 mm (0.52 in) machine guns.

== Service history ==
Gorizia was laid down at the Odero-Terni-Orlando (OTO) shipyard in Livorno on 17 March 1930. She was launched on 28 December that year, and was completed nearly a year later on 23 December 1931 when she was commissioning into the 2nd Division. She took part in naval exercises held off Naples on 13 August in honor of King Victor Emmanuel III. On the 25th, she became the flagship of the division. She participated in a naval review on 6–7 July 1933 in the Gulf of Naples for Italian dictator Benito Mussolini. On 16 September, the ship was transferred to the 1st Division, where she also served as the flagship. She received her battle flag from her namesake city on 29 June 1934. Gorizia escorted the royal yacht Savoia on a trip to the east coast of Africa in October; the tour included port calls in Berbera and Mogadishu in British and Italian Somaliland, respectively.

The commander of the 1st Division briefly transferred his flag to Gorizia's sister ship Pola on 31 December, before returning to Gorizia on 3 June 1935. The ship was sent to Spanish waters on 24 July 1936 to evacuate Italian nationals from the port of Gijón during the Spanish Civil War. She passed through the Strait of Gibraltar on 29 July and arrived in Gijon on the 31st. After embarking the Italian nationals on 1 August, Gorizia cruised to Le Verdon-sur-Mer, France, where they were disembarked between 1 and 4 August. The next day, the ship departed for Germany, arriving in Kiel on 8 August for a naval review with the German heavy cruiser Admiral Graf Spee, the light cruiser Königsberg, and the British cruiser HMS Neptune. Gorizia remained in Kiel to show the flag during the 1936 Summer Olympics, as the sailing events for the Berlin games were held in Kiel.

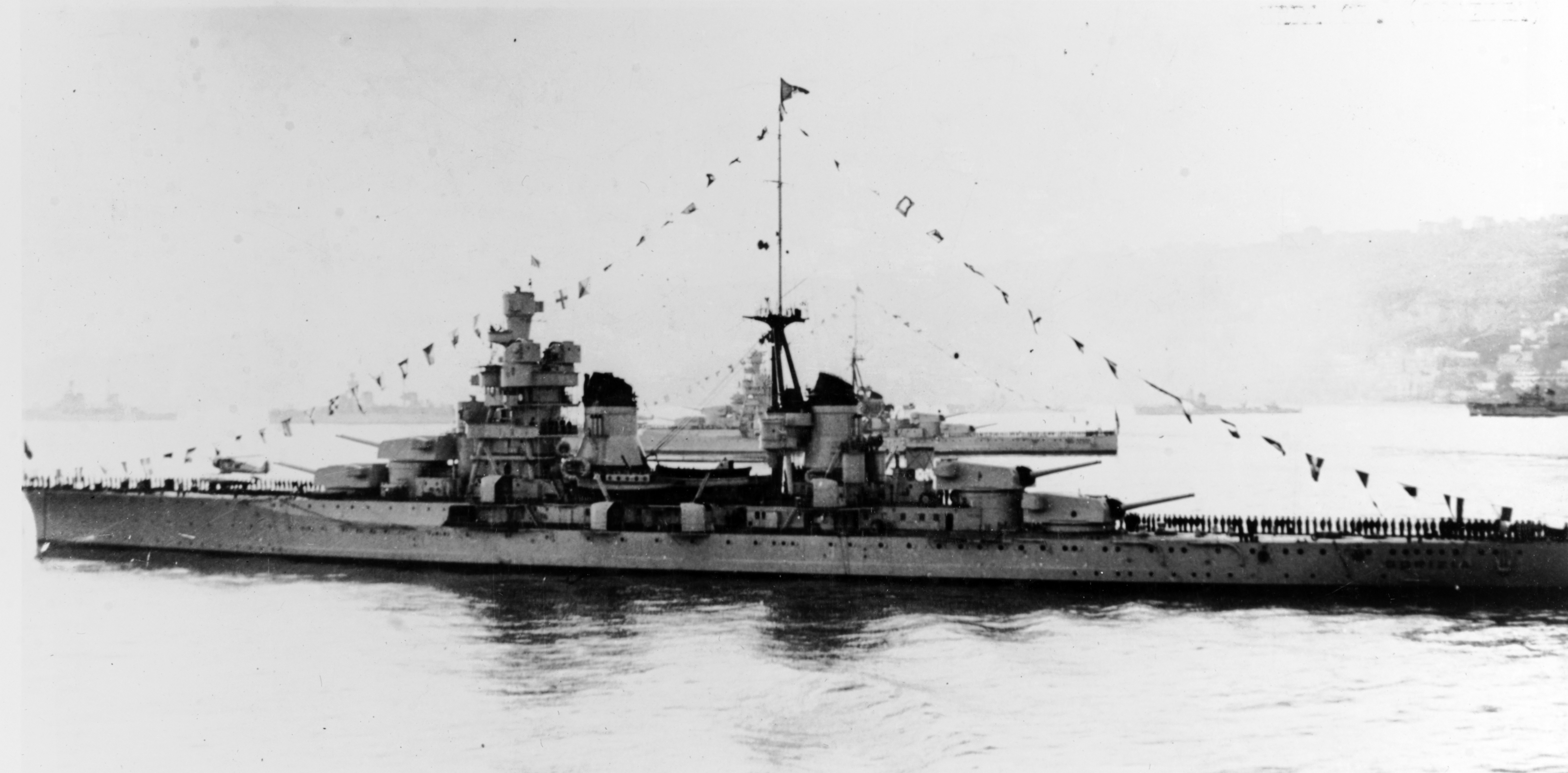
Gorizia at a pre-war fleet review

On 19 August, Gorizia departed Kiel and steamed to Tangier, arriving five days later. After a short stop, the ship left the port, bound for Italy, but that night her forward aviation gas tank exploded, causing serious damage. She was forced to return to Tangier before proceeding to Gibraltar on 25 August for temporary repairs. While in dry dock, British officials examined the vessel and concluded that she exceeded her nominal 10,000-ton displacement, though they lodged no formal complaint for Italy's violation of the Washington Naval Treaty. The repairs were completed by 9 September, allowing Gorizia to leave Gibraltar for La Spezia, where permanent repairs would be effected. She arrived two days later; the work was completed by November, and on the 27th, she took part in a naval review for the Regent of Hungary, Miklós Horthy. Gorizia again lost her role as divisional flagship on 17 May 1937, this time being replaced by her sister Fiume. A naval review was held in the Gulf of Naples on 7 June, followed by another the following year on 5 May; the latter was to honor German dictator Adolf Hitler during his state visit to Italy.

On 7 March 1939, Gorizia and her sister ships sortied from Taranto to intercept a squadron of Spanish Republican Navy warships—three cruisers and eight destroyers—attempting to reach the Black Sea. The Italian ships were ordered not to open fire but merely to try to impede the progress of the Spanish ships and force them to dock at Augusta, Sicily, where they would be interned. The Spanish commander refused to stop in Augusta and instead steamed to Bizerte in French Tunisia, where his ships were interned. A month later, from 7 to 9 April, Gorizia supported the Italian invasion of Albania without incident. She was present during the visit of Ramón Serrano Suñer, then the foreign minister of Francoist Spain, which had recently defeated the Republicans in the Spanish Civil War. Five days later, the ship took part in the Navy Day festivities in Venice. Gorizia spent the rest of 1939 and early 1940 uneventfully.

=== World War II ===
==== 1940 ====
Upon Italy's entrance into the Second World War on 10 June 1940, Gorizia was assigned to the 1st Division of the 1st Squadron, which also included her sisters Zara and Fiume and the four Oriani-class destroyers. At the time, the division was based in Taranto; the ships were immediately sent to patrol off the island of Crete, and on 11–12 June, the ships were attacked by an unknown submarine, which the Gorizia and the destroyers unsuccessfully counterattacked. She was present at the Battle of Calabria on 9 July, and was initially stationed on the disengaged side of the Italian line. Torpedo bombers from HMS Eagle attacked Gorizia and the other heavy cruisers, but they failed to score any hits. After the Italian battleships engaged their British counterparts, Gorizia and the other heavy cruisers steamed ahead to the front of the line and joined the attack on the leading British battleship, Warspite, but they scored no hits. A hit on the battleship Giulio Cesare that reduced her speed to 18 knots (33 km/h; 21 mph) forced the Italian commander to break off the engagement, as his ships could no longer keep formation. British cruisers attacked as the Italians withdrew, but heavy fire from the Italian cruisers drove them off.

On 30 July, the 1st Division escorted a convoy to Italian Libya, arriving back in Augusta on 1 August. Gunnery training off Naples followed on 16 August, and on 29 August the ships left Naples for Taranto, arriving the next day. On the 31st, the 1st Division sortied to intercept the British convoys in Operation Hats, though the Italian fleet broke off the attack without encountering the merchant ships. On 7–9 September, Gorizia patrolled off Sicily but failed to locate any British vessels, and she thereafter docked in Palermo. She returned to Taranto on the 11th and took part in gunnery training on 23 and 24 September and again on 6 November. She was present in the harbor on the night of 11–12 November during the British attack on Taranto, but was undamaged in the air raid. Her anti-aircraft batteries shot down one of the attacking British aircraft. The ship was transferred to Naples on the 12th. She took part in the Battle of Cape Spartivento, where she engaged British cruisers and shot down a British aircraft. British bombing of the port four days later forced the Italians to again relocate the cruisers, sending them temporarily to La Maddalena in Sardinia on 15 December.

==== 1941 ====
Gorizia painted in dazzle camouflage in 1942

Gorizia returned to Taranto in late January 1941. She conducted maneuvers with Zara on 29 January; she then went to La Spezia for periodic maintenance, which lasted from 28 February to 7 May. Pola took her place in the 1st Division, and all three of her sisters were sunk in the Battle of Cape Matapan on 28 March. Since the 1st Division had been effectively wiped out at Cape Matapan, Gorizia was reassigned to the 3rd Division on 8 May, along with the two Trento-class cruisers. The ships, based in Messina, began escorting convoys to North Africa that month, the first of which took place from 26 to 28 May. Another convoy departed Italy on 25 June, escorted by Gorizia, Trieste, and a squadron of destroyers. The convoy, which consisted of requisitioned transatlantic liners, steamed to Tripoli and back, arriving in Taranto on 1 July. On 23 August, the main fleet sortied to intercept the British Force H, though they failed to locate their opponent.

Over the course of 9–11 September, the British launched several air strikes on Messina, and Gorizia contributed her anti-aircraft batteries to the defense of the port. Later in the month, the British sent another convoy to reinforce Malta codenamed Operation Halberd; the Italian fleet sortied on 26 September to try to intercept it, but broke off the operation upon discovering the strength of the British escort force. On 29 September, upon returning from the failed attempt to disrupt Operation Halberd, Gorizia was sent to operate from La Maddalena, though she returned to Messina on 10 October. An Allied air attack on the port on 21 November caused extensive damage to Gorizia's superstructure from bomb splinters, though she nevertheless sortied that day to escort another convoy to North Africa. On 16 and 17 December, while on another convoy escort mission, she took part in the First Battle of Sirte against a force of British light cruisers and destroyers.

==== 1942 ====
Gorizia firing her main battery during the Second Battle of Sirte

While in Messina on 25 January 1942, the ship was visited by the German Luftwaffe officer Generaloberst Bruno Loerzer, who had arrived to command German air units stationed on the island. Five days later, Umberto, Prince of Piedmont, the heir to the italian crown, and Hermann Göring, the commander of the Luftwaffe, visited the ship on a tour of major bases in Sicily. Gorizia returned to combat operations in February; she sortied on the 14th to search for Allied shipping, but instead came under heavy attack from both torpedo bombers and submarines. She returned to Messina undamaged. On 21 February, she joined another convoy to Tripoli before returning to Messina on the 24th. A month later, on 22 March, she took part in the Second Battle of Sirte, where she was heavily engaged with British light cruisers and destroyers. The engagement occurred at long range, and smoke from the British ships interfered with the Italians' gunnery, and Gorizia scored no hits. In the course of the battle, she had fired 226 rounds from her main battery.

By May, her 203 mm guns were worn out from their use in the Battles of Sirte, and so they were relined in Messina early that month. Allied air attacks targeted the ship in Messina on 25 and 26 May, but she suffered only splinter damage. Further attacks over the following two days inflicted no damage at all. On the 28th, she left Messina for Taranto; although Allied aircraft continued to attack Gorizia there from 8 to 11 June, she remained unscathed. On 15 June, the fleet sortied once again to intercept a convoy to Malta, codenamed Operation Vigorous. While on the mission, Gorizia's floatplane failed to return and was presumed lost. British torpedo bombers attacked Gorizia three times, but failed to score any hits. The cruiser Trento was hit by a torpedo and was later sunk by a British submarine. On 5 July, Gorizia returned to Messina, and on the 17th, she hosted a visit from Umberto. While she was on an operation to catch a British convoy on 11–13 August, a British submarine attempted to torpedo the ship while she slowed down to launch one of her floatplanes. She successfully evaded the attack, but the cruisers Bolzano and Muzio Attendolo were not as lucky, both being badly damaged. Gorizia, Trieste, and two destroyers proceeded on to Messina while the other five destroyers stayed to protect the two damaged cruisers. Umberto made another visit to the ship on 27 August in Messina.

==== Fate ====
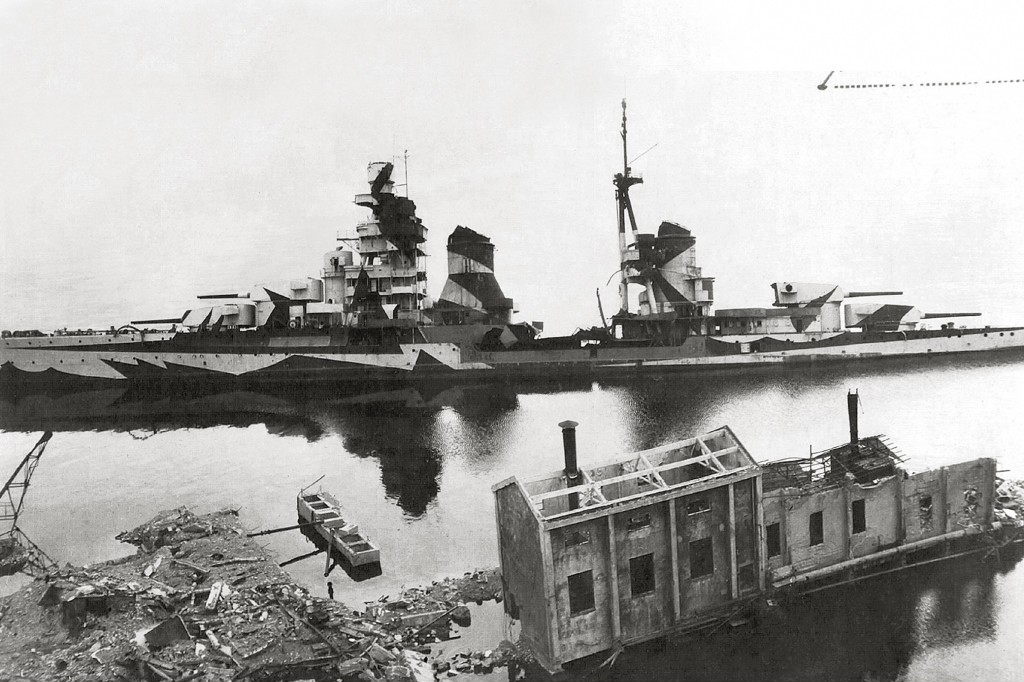
Gorizia abandoned at the end of the war

By December, the threat from Allied bombers had increased significantly, forcing the Regia Marina to abandon Messina as a major base. On 9 December, the 3rd Division left for La Maddalena further north in Sardinia, arriving the next day. Nevertheless, a major attack from United States Army Air Forces (USAAF) heavy bombers struck La Maddalena on 10 April 1943 and sank Trieste and hit Gorizia with three bombs, inflicting serious damage. One bomb penetrated the rear superfiring turret and exploded inside and the other two struck the deck abreast of the superstructure on the port side. Near misses breached the hull below the waterline, but damage control parties kept flooding to a minimum. Two days after the attack, Gorizia steamed to La Spezia for repairs. On 19 April, an Allied air attack on the port inflicted minor splinter damage. Umberto made another visit to the ship while she was awaiting repair on 20 April. Ten days later, the 3rd Division was disbanded, since the two surviving Italian heavy cruisers were out of action, Bolzano having been torpedoed and badly damaged by a British submarine in August 1942.

Gorizia entered the dry dock in La Spezia to begin repairs on 4 May; she was still under repair when Italy surrendered to the Allies in September. The ship's commander initially ordered the caretaker crew to flood the drydock and scuttle the ship when German troops occupied the port, but cancelled the order when it became clear the ship would be of no use to the Germans anyway. The Germans later moved the ship out of the dock, anchored her in the harbor, and abandoned her. On the night of 21–22 June 1944, British and Italian frogmen used Chariot manned torpedoes to infiltrate the harbor to sink Gorizia and Bolzano to prevent the Germans from using them as blockships; while the commandos did sink Bolzano, they were unsuccessful with Gorizia. She remained afloat and heavily listing in April 1945, when Allied forces liberated La Spezia. Judged to be too badly damaged to repair, the postwar navy decided to discard the ship. She was accordingly stricken from the naval register on 27 February 1947 and broken up for scrap.
