= Zara-class cruiser =

Heavy cruiser class of the Italian Royal Navy

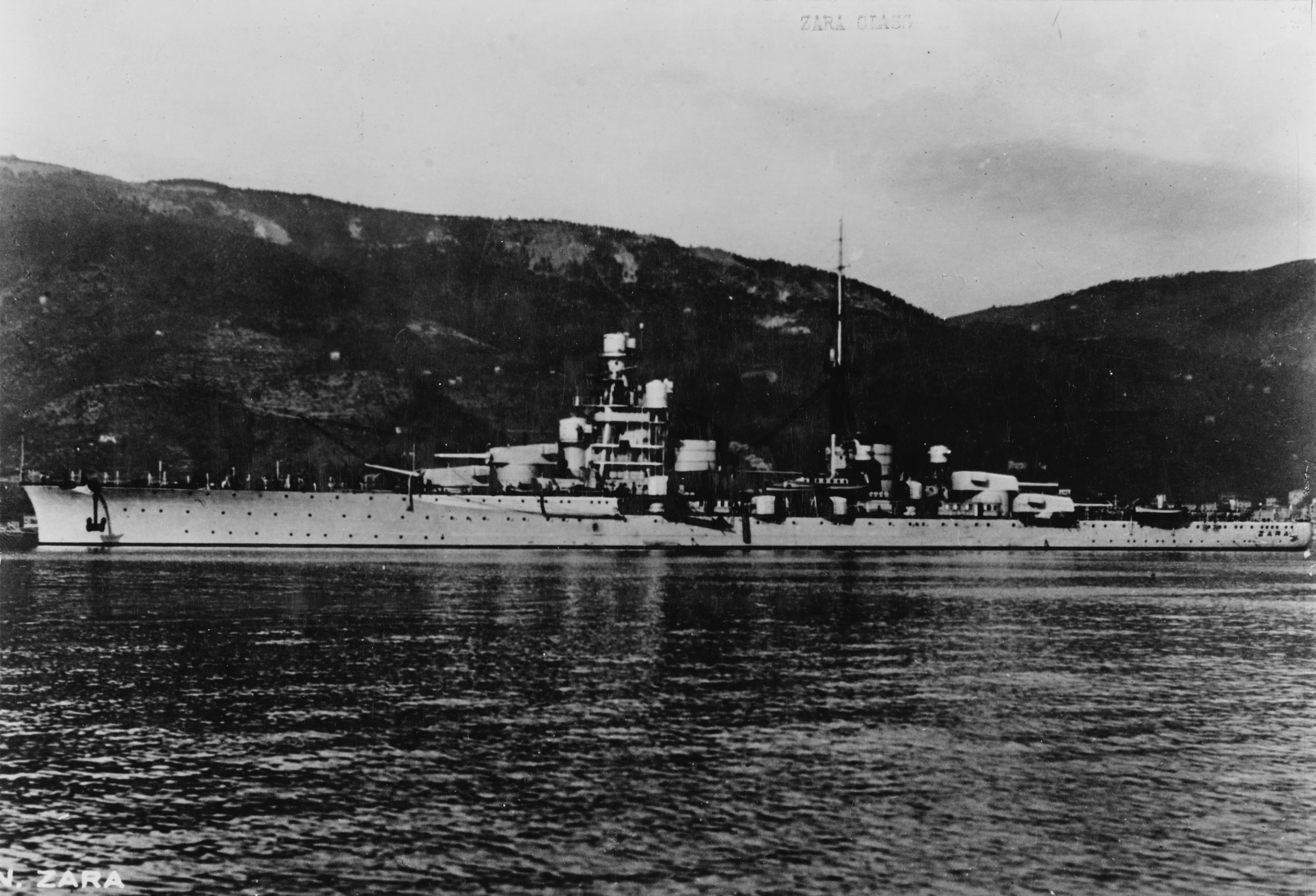
- Zara before the war

Class overview
- Name: Zara class
- Builders: Odero Terni Orlando; Stabilimento Tecnico Triestino
- Operators: Regia Marina
- Preceded by: Trento class
- Succeeded by: Bolzano
- Built: 1929–1932
- In commission: 1931–1944
- Completed: 4
- Lost: 4

General characteristics
- Type: Heavy cruiser
- Displacement: Standard: 11,326 to 11,712 long tons (11,508 to 11,900 t); Full load: 13,944 to 14,330 long tons (14,168 to 14,560 t)
- Length: 179.6 m (589 ft 3 in) lwl; 182.8 m (599 ft 9 in) loa
- Beam: 20.62 m (67 ft 8 in)
- Draft: 7.2 m (23 ft 7 in)
- Installed power: 8 × Thornycroft boilers; 95,000 shp (71,000 kW)
- Propulsion: 2 × steam turbines; 2 × screw propellers
- Speed: 32 knots (37 mph; 59 km/h)
- Complement: 841
- Armament: 8 × 203 mm (8 in) / 53 caliber guns; 16 × 100 mm (3.9 in) / 47 caliber guns; 4 × 40 mm (1.6 in) / 39 caliber anti-aircraft guns (early); 8 × 37 mm (1.5 in) / 54 caliber anti-aircraft guns (late); 14 × 20 mm (0.79 in) / 65 caliber anti-aircraft guns (Gorizia only); 8 × 13.2 mm (0.52 in) machine guns
- Armor: Deck: 70 mm (2.8 in); Belt: 150 mm (5.9 in); Turret faces: 150 mm; Barbettes: 150 mm; Conning tower: 150 mm
- Aircraft carried: 2 × seaplanes

The Zara class was a group of four heavy cruisers built for the Italian Regia Marina (Royal Navy) in the late 1920s and the early 1930s. The class comprised the vessels Zara, Fiume, Gorizia, and Pola, the last of which was completed to a slightly different design. The ships were a substantial improvement over the preceding Trento-class cruisers, incorporating significantly heavier armor protection at the cost of the very high speed of the Trentos. They carried the same main battery of eight 203 mm (8.0 in) guns and had a maximum speed of 32 knots (59 km/h; 37 mph). Among the best-protected heavy cruisers built by any navy in the 1930s, the heavy armor was acquired only by violating the terms of the Washington Naval Treaty, which limited cruiser displacement to 10,000 long tons (10,160 t).

All four ships served with the main fleet in the interwar period, where they were primarily occupied with training exercises and fleet reviews. During the Spanish Civil War, Gorizia evacuated Italian nationals and Pola took part in non-intervention patrols. All four ships supported the Italian invasion of Albania in April 1939, shortly before the outbreak of World War II. After Italy joined the wider conflict in 1940, the four ships saw extensive action in the Mediterranean Sea against British forces, including the battles of Calabria and Cape Matapan. During the latter engagement, Pola was immobilized by an aerial torpedo, and then along with Zara and Fiume were all sunk in a one-sided night action with three British battleships.

Gorizia continued in service, seeing further action at the First and Second Battles of Sirte. She was seriously damaged by American heavy bombers in April 1943 and towed to La Spezia, where she was still under repair when Italy surrendered in September. Germany seized the ship when they occupied the port, and Italian commandos unsuccessfully attempted to sink her in June 1944. In poor condition by the end of the war, the postwar Italian Navy decided to sell the ship for scrap in 1947.

== Design ==
While the preceding Trento class of heavy cruisers were still being built, elements of the Italian naval command began to doubt the effectiveness of the new vessels, which sacrificed armor protection in favor of very high speeds. They advocated a more balanced design that would incorporate more comprehensive armor, with a main belt that was 200 millimeters (7.9 in) thick, while retaining the battery of eight 203 mm (8 in) guns and a speed of at least 32 knots (59 km/h; 37 mph). The designers quickly found that these characteristics could not be incorporated into a vessel that remained within the 10,000-long-ton (10,160 t) limit imposed by the Washington Naval Treaty. The naval command agreed to allow the new ships to exceed the displacement limits, but instructed the designers to eliminate unnecessary features to save as much weight as possible. As a result, the belt armor was reduced in thickness and the planned torpedo tubes were removed. The flush deck of the Trentos was abandoned, with the ships instead incorporating a forecastle deck and a stepped-down main deck. In addition, the Zara design would be powered by just two propellers driven by lightweight machinery, unlike the four-shaft arrangement used in the Trentos. Nevertheless, the ships still exceeded the displacement limit by at least 1,300 long tons (1,300 t). By 1928, the work was finished on what would become the Zara class, and the first two ships, Zara and Fiume, were ordered for the 1928–1929 building program. Gorizia followed in the 1929–1930 construction year, and Pola was ordered under the 1930–1931 program. All four ships were named for formerly Austro-Hungarian cities that were annexed to Italy in the aftermath of World War I.

=== General characteristics ===
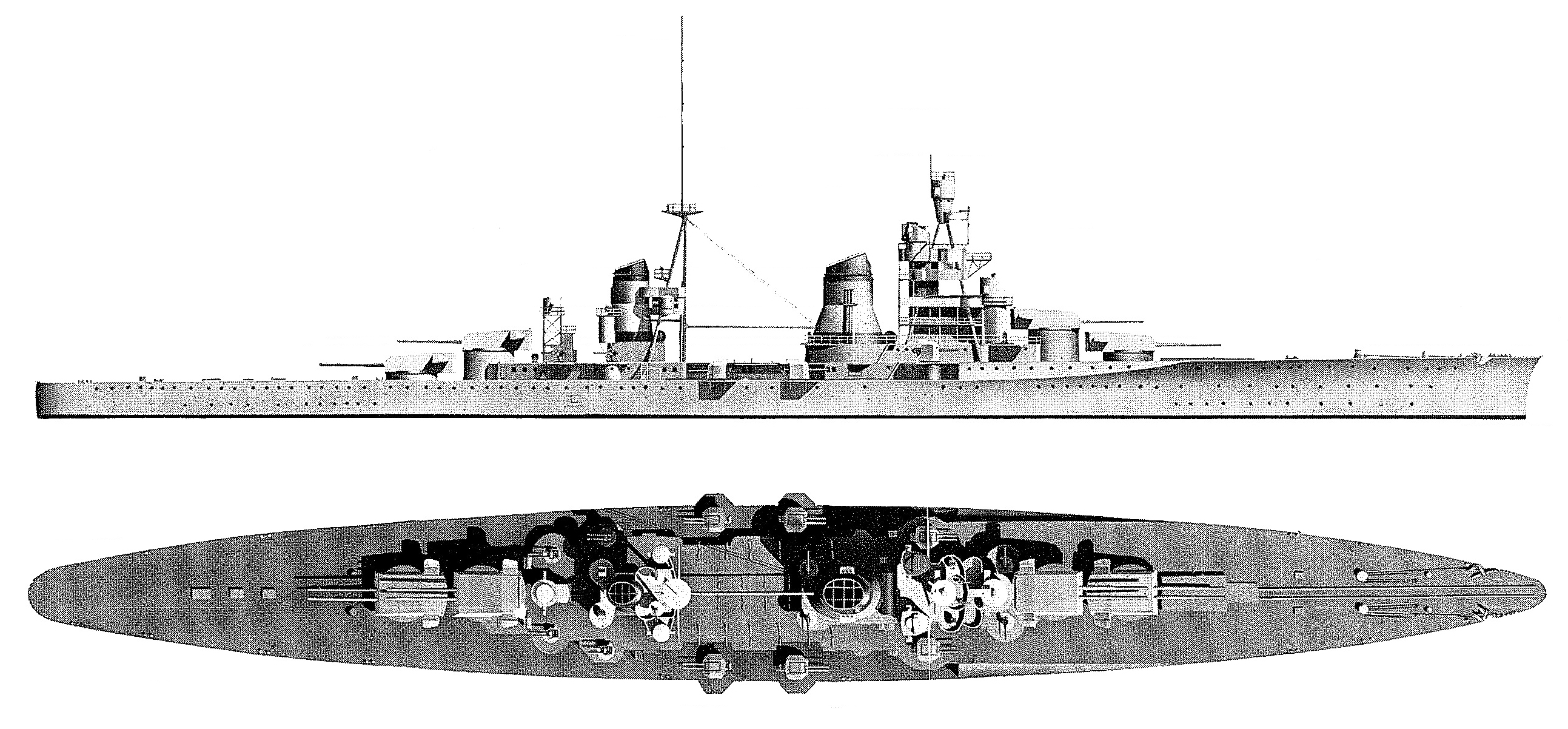
Line drawing of the Zara class

The ships of the Zara class were 179.6 meters (589 ft) long at the waterline and 182.8 m (600 ft) long overall. They had a beam of 20.62 m (67.7 ft) and a draft of 7.2 m (24 ft). The ships had a standard displacement of 11,326 to 11,712 long tons (11,508 to 11,900 t), and displaced 13,944 to 14,330 long tons (14,168 to 14,560 t) at full load, with Fiume being the lightest of the four and Gorizia the heaviest. The first three ships were built with light superstructures as a weight saving measure, but Pola, intended to serve as a flagship, received a much larger bridge structure to accommodate an admiral's staff. All four ships received two tripod masts, with the forward mast erected over the bridge. They had a crew of 841 officers and enlisted men. The ships carried a pair of IMAM Ro.43 seaplanes for aerial reconnaissance; the hangar was located under the forecastle and a fixed catapult was mounted on the centerline at the bow.

The ships' power plant consisted of two Parsons steam turbines powered by eight oil-fired Thornycroft boilers, with the exception of Fiume, which received Yarrow boilers. The boilers were trunked into two funnels amidships. Their engines were rated at 95,000 shaft horsepower (71,000 kW) and produced a top speed of 32 knots (59 km/h; 37 mph), though on sea trials all four vessels significantly exceeded those figures, reaching a minimum of 118,000 shp (88,000 kW) and speeds of 33 to 34 knots (61 to 63 km/h; 38 to 39 mph). Nevertheless, in service, their practical speeds were in the range of 31 to 32 knots (57 to 59 km/h; 36 to 37 mph). The vessels each carried 2,300 to 2,400 long tons (2,300 to 2,400 t) of fuel oil, which allowed them to steam for 4,850 to 5,400 nautical miles (8,980 to 10,000 km; 5,580 to 6,210 mi) at a cruising speed of 16 knots (30 km/h; 18 mph). When operating at maximum speed, their operational radius fell to 1,150 to 1,900 nautical miles (2,130 to 3,520 km; 1,320 to 2,190 mi), though due to the fact that Italian naval vessels were intended to operate only within the narrow confines of the Mediterranean Sea, their relatively short cruising range was not a significant problem.

=== Armament and armor ===
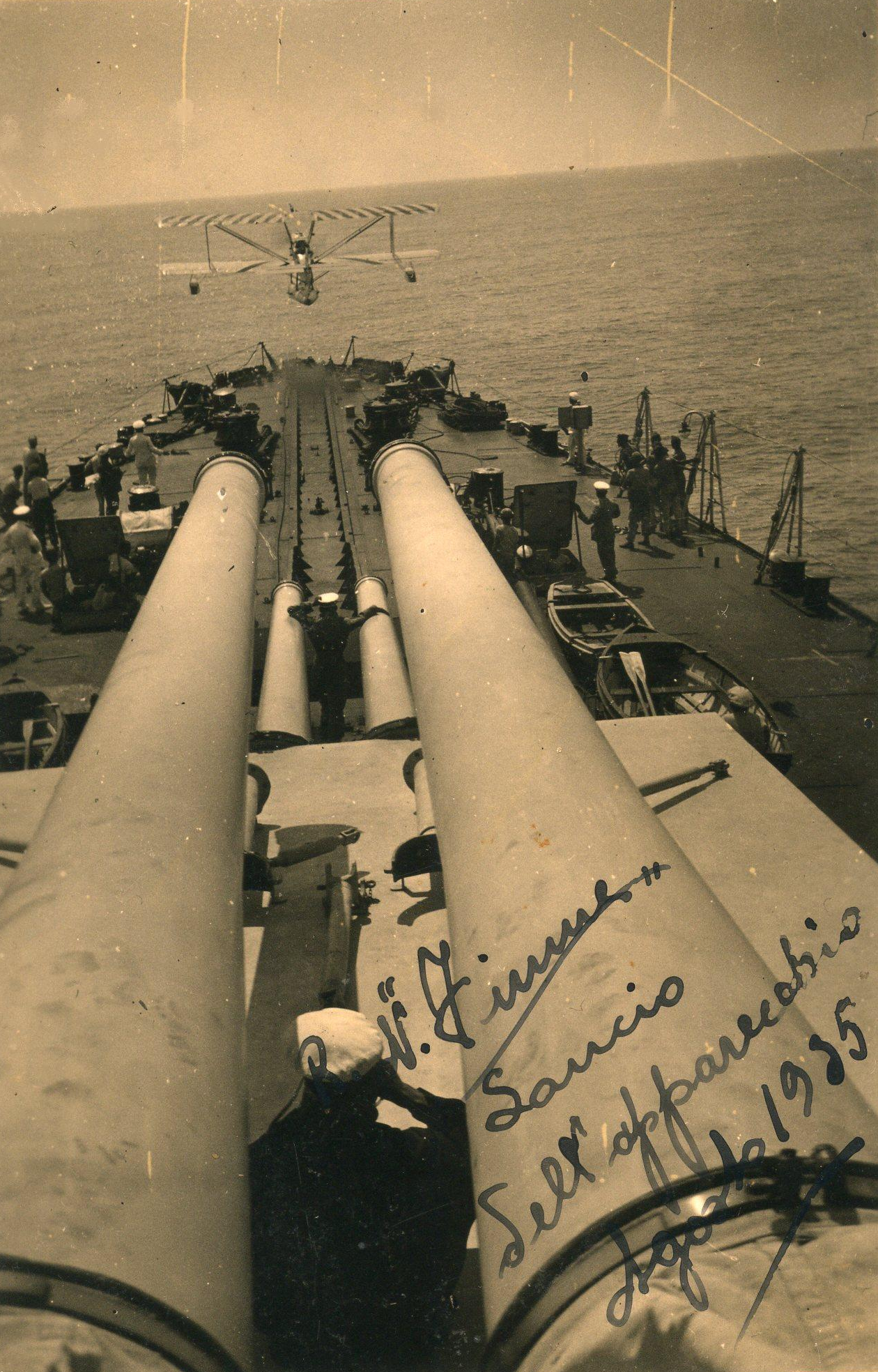
Fiume launching a seaplane in 1935; note the closeness of the main battery guns

The Zaras were armed with a main battery of eight 203 mm Mod 29 53-caliber guns in four gun turrets. The turrets were arranged in superfiring pairs forward and aft. The guns fired 125-kilogram (276 lb) shells at a muzzle velocity of 940 meters per second (3,080 ft/s), with a rate of fire of about three and a half rounds per minute. The turrets allowed elevation to 45 degrees, which provided a maximum range of 31,500 meters (34,400 yd). Each ship carried 157 shells per gun. Like the Trentos, the Zara-class ships suffered from shell dispersion that hampered accuracy. The problem was in large part due to poor quality control in Italian munition factories, which failed to ensure tight manufacturing tolerances necessary for accurate shells. In addition, the single cradle mounts required the guns to be very close together; this caused the shells to interfere with each other in flight and contributed to the dispersion problem. In an attempt to rectify the dispersion problem, the guns were supplied with modified shells that fired at 900 meters per second (3,000 ft/s).

Anti-aircraft defense was provided by a battery of sixteen 100 mm (3.9 in) 47-cal. guns in twin mounts, four Vickers-Terni 40 mm (1.6 in) /39 guns in single mounts and eight 13.2 mm (0.52 in) guns in twin mounts. The 100 mm guns were copies of Austro-Hungarian guns designed in 1910 by Škoda that were placed in newly designed dual-purpose mounts that elevated to 85 degrees for a maximum range of 15,240 m (50,000 ft). The ships' secondary battery was revised several times during their careers. Two of the 100 mm guns and all of the 40 mm guns were removed in the late 1930s and eight 37 mm (1.5 in) 54-cal. guns were installed in their place. Two 120 mm (4.7 in) 15-cal. star shell guns were added in 1940. In 1942, the star shell guns aboard Gorizia, by this time the only surviving member of the class, were replaced with four more 37 mm guns. The following year, a battery of fourteen 20 mm (0.79 in) guns in six twin and two single mounts replaced the 13.2 mm (0.52 in) machine guns.

The ships were protected with an armored citadel that covered the ships' vitals, including the machinery spaces and ammunition magazines. Vertical protection consisted of an armored belt that was 150 mm (5.9 in) thick at the waterline and reduced to 100 mm (3.9 in) at the bottom edge of the belt. Their main armor deck was 70 mm (2.8 in) thick, and the box formed by the belt and deck was capped at either end by armored bulkheads that were 120 mm (4.7 in) thick in the upper portion and 90 mm (3.5 in) in the lower section. The main deck was supplemented with an upper deck that was 20 mm (0.79 in) thick, which was intended to detonate the fuses of incoming shells before they struck the main deck; the upper deck was connected to an upper belt that was 30 mm (1.2 in) thick. The gun turrets had 150 mm thick plating on the faces and the barbettes they sat in were also 150 mm thick. The main conning tower had 150 mm thick sides and an 80 mm (3.1 in) thick roof.

The Zara class carried three times the armor protection of the preceding Trentos. Their heavy armor made the Zaras the best-protected cruisers until the introduction of the Des Moines class, laid down in 1945 by the United States. This additional armor would have made the ships decidedly nose-heavy, so to offset this the rear of the ship was raised by one deck behind the front funnel. The result was excellent watertight integrity and protection.

== Ships ==
List of Zara-class cruisers of the Regia Marina
Name	Builder	Laid down	Launched	Completed	Fate
Zara	O.T.O. La Spezia	4 July 1929	27 April 1930	20 October 1931	Sunk during the Battle of Cape Matapan, 29 March 1941
Fiume	Stabilimento Tecnico Triestino	29 April 1929	27 April 1930	23 November 1931	Sunk during the Battle of Cape Matapan, 28 March 1941
Gorizia	O.T.O. Livorno	17 March 1930	28 December 1930	23 December 1931	Disabled by manned torpedoes, 21-22 June 1944; Scrapped, 1946
Pola	O.T.O. Livorno	17 March 1931	5 December 1931	21 December 1932	Sunk during the Battle of Cape Matapan, 28 March 1941

== Service history ==
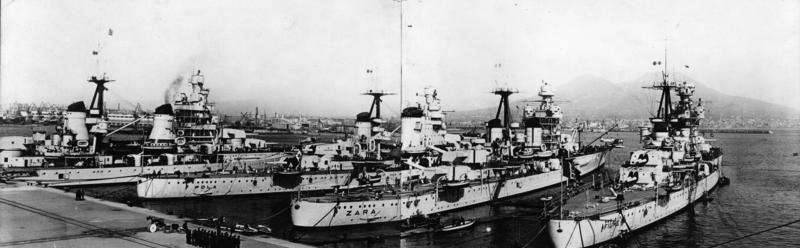
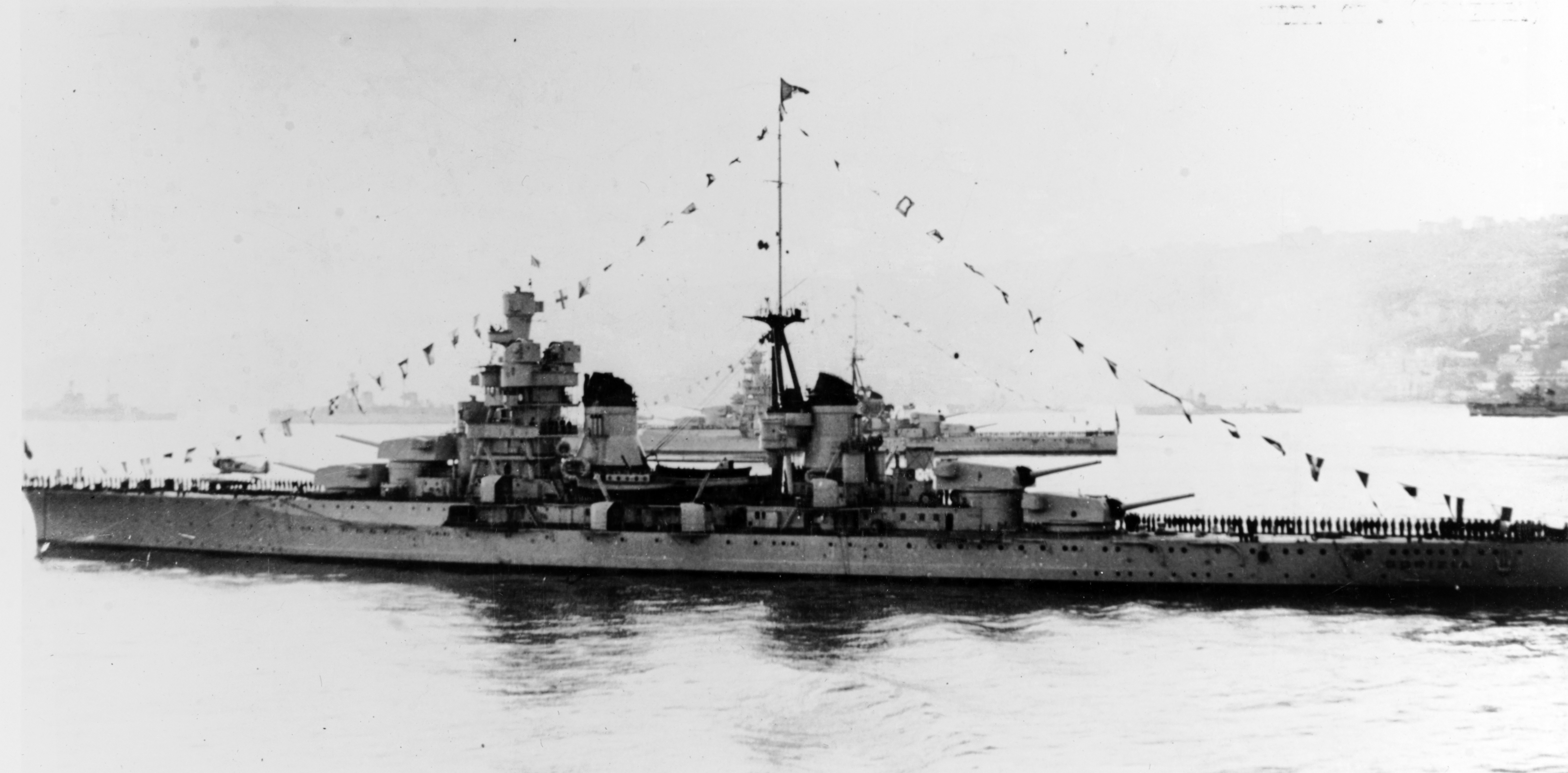
Top: Pola, Zara, and Fiume in Naples in 1938. Bottom: Gorizia at a fleet review in Naples.

After entering service in the early 1930s, the four members of the Zara class took part in training exercises with the Italian fleet and participated in fleet reviews held for foreign leaders, including Adolf Hitler of Nazi Germany and Miklós Horthy, the Regent of Hungary. Gorizia and Pola were involved in the Spanish Civil War; in 1936 Pola conducted non-intervention patrols and Gorizia carried Italian nationals from Gijón, Spain, to Le Verdon-sur-Mer, France that year. After departing France, Gorizia visited Germany, and on the way back, she suffered a major explosion in an aviation gasoline tank that forced her to put into Gibraltar for repairs. There, British shipyard inspectors discovered that the ship was grossly over the Washington Treaty's displacement restriction. In March 1939, all four ships sortied to prevent a squadron of Republican warships from reaching the Black Sea, forcing them to stop in Bizerte, Tunisia, where they were interned. The following month, Zara, Pola, and Gorizia provided gunfire support to Italian forces invading Albania.

The Zara-class cruisers saw extensive service during World War II, having taken part in several sorties to catch British convoys in the Mediterranean as the flagship of the 1st Division. At the Battle of Calabria in July 1940, torpedo bombers from the British aircraft carrier HMS Eagle attacked the Zara-class cruisers, but they failed to score any hits. The ships steamed ahead to the front of the Italian line of battle and joined the attack on the leading British battleship, Warspite, but they scored no hits. British cruisers attacked as the Italians withdrew, but heavy fire from the Italian cruisers drove them off. All four ships escaped damage at the Battle of Taranto in November 1940.

In March 1941 at the Battle of Cape Matapan, Pola was immobilized by a torpedo from a Swordfish torpedo bomber launched by the British aircraft carrier HMS Formidable; Zara and Fiume were detached from the rest of the fleet to protect Pola, and all three and a pair of destroyers were sunk in a close-range night engagement with the battleships Barham, Valiant, and Warspite. Italian casualties were very heavy, with 783 killed aboard Zara, 328 killed aboard Pola, 812 aboard Fiume. The survivors, mostly from Pola, were rescued primarily by British destroyers, though Greek destroyers and an Italian hospital ship picked up others over the following few days.

Gorizia, the sole surviving member of the class, saw action at the First Battle of Sirte in December 1941 and Second Sirte in March 1942, where she was heavily engaged with British light cruisers and destroyers. As the action took place at very long range, neither side scored any hits. During this period, the ship also took part in convoy escort operations to supply Italian and German forces in North Africa. While the ship was moored in La Maddalena on 10 April 1943, a major attack from United States Army Air Forces heavy bombers sank the heavy cruiser Trieste and hit Gorizia with three bombs, inflicting serious damage. She was still under repair in La Spezia when Italy surrendered to the Allies in September, and she was seized by German forces when they occupied much of the country. On 22 June 1944, Italian frogmen used Chariot manned torpedoes to enter the harbor and sink Gorizia and the heavy cruiser Bolzano, which was also out of service due to battle damage, to prevent them from being used as blockships though Gorizia survived the attack. She was nevertheless sold for scrap in 1947, since it would have been cost-prohibitive to repair her.
