= Italian cruiser Fiume =

Heavy cruiser of the Italian Royal Navy

Coordinates: 35°21′N 20°57′E

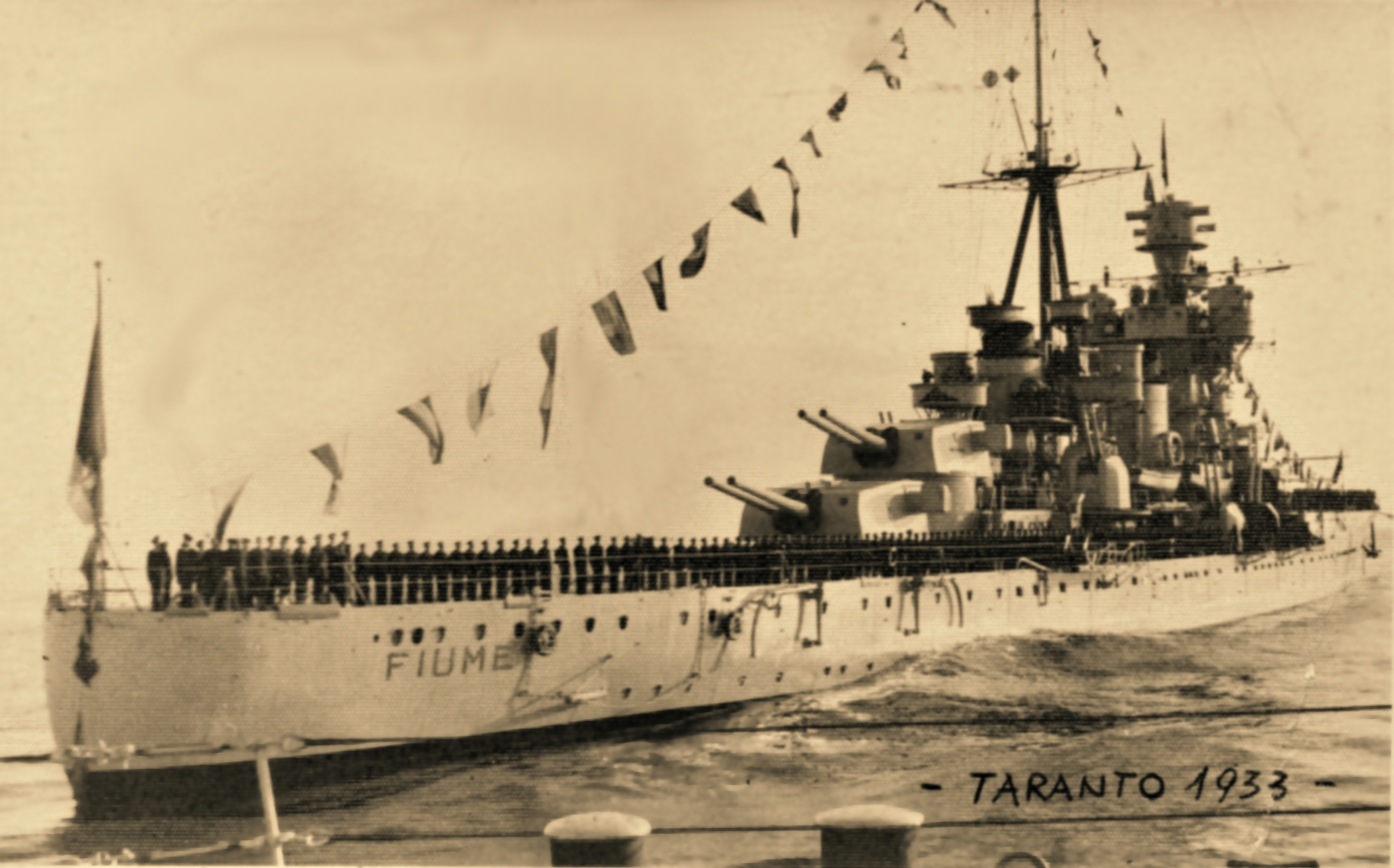
- Fiume in Taranto in 1933

History

Italy
- Name: Fiume
- Namesake: Fiume
- Builder: Stabilimento Tecnico Triestino, Trieste
- Laid down: 29 April 1929
- Launched: 27 April 1930
- Commissioned: 23 November 1931
- Fate: Sunk during Battle of Cape Matapan, 29 March 1941

General characteristics
- Class & type: Zara-class cruiser
- Displacement: Full load: 13,944 long tons (14,168 t)
- Length: 182.8 m (599 ft 9 in)
- Beam: 20.6 m (67 ft 7 in)
- Draft: 7.2 m (23 ft 7 in)
- Installed power: 8 × 3-drum Yarrow boilers; 95,000 shp (71,000 kW)
- Propulsion: 2 × Parsons steam turbines
- Speed: 33 knots (61 km/h; 38 mph)
- Range: 5,361 nmi (9,929 km; 6,169 mi) at 16 knots (30 km/h; 18 mph)
- Complement: 841
- Armament: 8 × 203 mm (8 in)/53 cal. guns; 16 × 100 mm (4 in) / 47 caliber guns; 6 × Vickers-Terni 40 mm/39 guns; 8 × 13.2 mm machine guns
- Armor: Deck: 70 mm (2.8 in); Belt: 150 mm (5.9 in); Turret faces: 150 mm; Barbettes: 150 mm
- Aircraft carried: 2

Fiume was a Zara-class heavy cruiser of the Italian Regia Marina, named after the Italian city of Fiume (now Rijeka, Croatia), she was the second of four ships in the class, and was built between April 1929 and November 1931. Armed with a main battery of eight 8-inch (200 mm) guns, she was nominally within the 10,000-long-ton (10,000 t) limit imposed by the Washington Naval Treaty, though in reality she significantly exceeded this figure.

Fiume saw extensive service during World War II, having participated in several sorties to catch British convoys in the Mediterranean. She was present during the Battle of Calabria in July 1940, Battle of Cape Spartivento in November, and ultimately the Battle of Cape Matapan in March 1941. In the last engagement, Fiume and her sister ships Zara and Pola were sunk in a close-range night engagement with three British battleships.

== Design ==
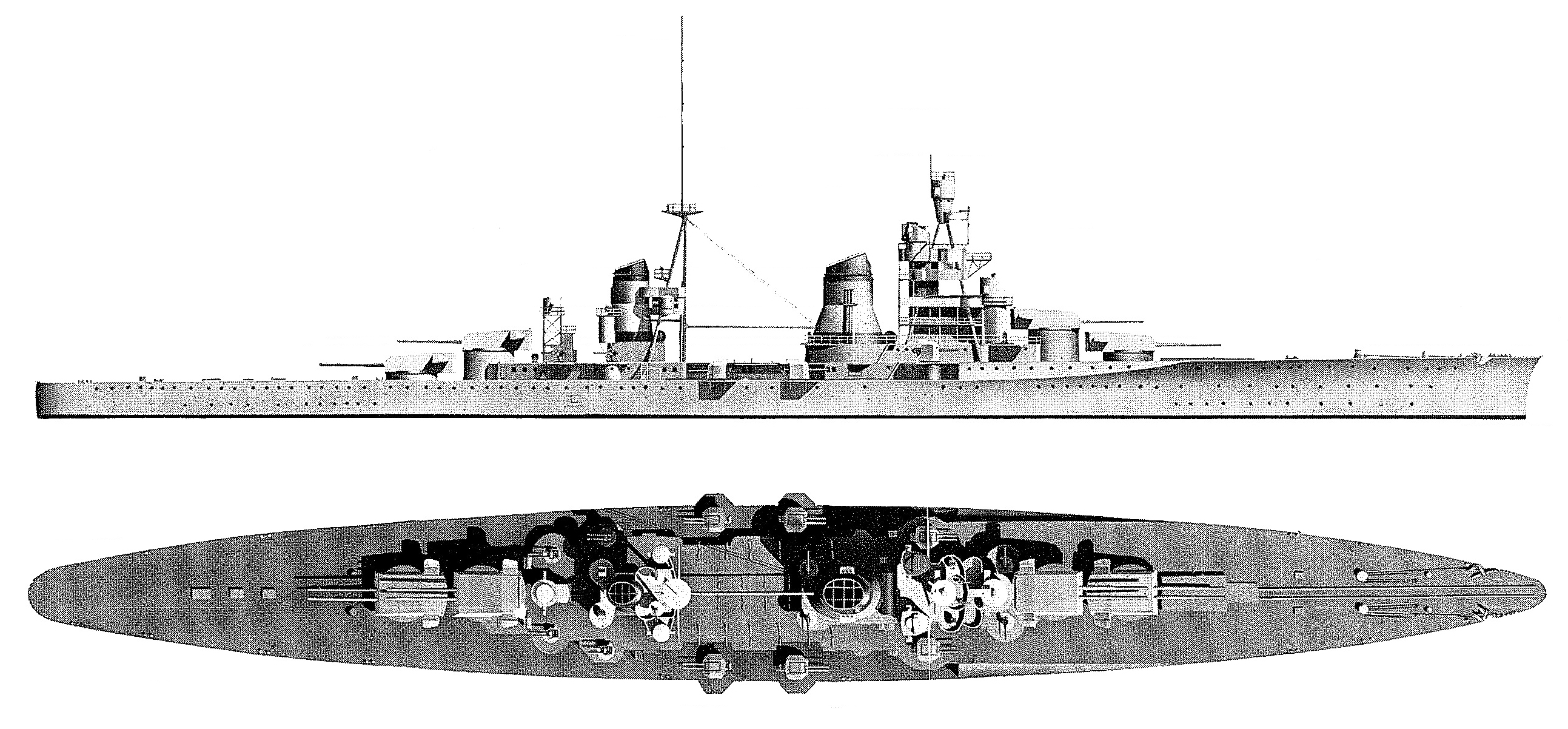
Profile and plan drawing of the Zara class

Fiume was 182.8 meters (600 ft) long overall, with a beam of 20.62 m (67.7 ft) and a draft of 7.2 m (24 ft). She displaced 13,944 long tons (14,168 t) at full load, though her displacement was nominally within the 10,000-long-ton (10,000 t) restriction set in place by the Washington Naval Treaty. Her power plant consisted of two Parsons steam turbines powered by eight oil-fired Yarrow boilers, which were trunked into two funnels amidships. Her engines were rated at 95,000 shaft horsepower (71,000 kW) and produced a top speed of 32 knots (59 km/h; 37 mph). She had a crew of 841 officers and enlisted men.

She was protected with an armor belt that was 150 mm (5.9 in) thick amidships. Her armor deck was 70 mm (2.8 in) thick in the central portion of the ship and reduced to 20 mm (0.79 in) at either end. The gun turrets had 150 mm thick plating on the faces and the barbettes they sat in were also 150 mm thick. The main conning tower had 150 mm thick sides.

She was armed with a main battery of eight 203 mm (8 in) Mod 29 53-caliber guns in four gun turrets. The turrets were arranged in superfiring pairs forward and aft. Anti-aircraft defense was provided by a battery of sixteen 100 mm (4 in) 47-cal. guns in twin mounts, four Vickers-Terni 40 mm/39 guns in single mounts and eight 12.7 mm (0.50 in) guns in twin mounts. She carried a pair of IMAM Ro.43 seaplanes for aerial reconnaissance; the hangar was located in under the forecastle and a fixed catapult was mounted on the centerline at the bow.

Fiume's secondary battery was revised several times during her career. Two of the 100 mm guns and all of the 40 mm and 12.7 mm guns were removed in the late 1930s and eight 37 mm (1.5 in) 54-cal. guns and eight 13.2 mm (0.52 in) guns were installed in their place. Two 120 mm (4.7 in) 15-cal. star shell guns were added in 1940.

== Service history ==
Built in the Stabilimento Tecnico Triestino in Trieste, Fiume was laid down on 29 April 1929, the first member of the class to be laid down. She was launched nearly a year later on 27 April 1930, the same day as her sister ship Zara. Fitting-out work lasted another year and a half, and the new cruiser was commissioning into the Regia Marina (Royal Navy) on 23 November 1931. In January 1935, tests with autogyros were conducted aboard Fiume; a wooden platform was built on the stern of the ship to support the aircraft. The experiments proved to be successful, although the autogyros themselves had very limited range and were unreliable. Fiume took part in a lavish ceremony held for the visit of Adolf Hitler, the dictator of Nazi Germany, in May 1938. She and Zara conducted a gunnery demonstration while Hitler and the dictator of Italy, Benito Mussolini, observed from the battleship Conte di Cavour.

=== World War II ===
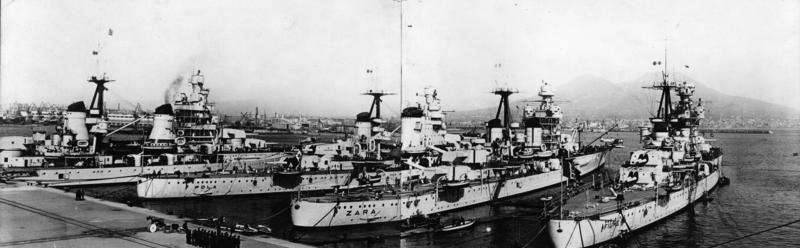
Fiume (right) along with Zara and Pola in Naples

When Italy formally joined the Second World War by declaring war on France and Britain on 10 June 1940, Fiume was assigned to the 1st Division with Zara and the four destroyers of the 9th Destroyer Flotilla. The unit was assigned to the 1st Squadron, under the command of Admiral Inigo Campioni. Two days later, Fiume and the rest of the 1st Division, along with the 9th Division, sortied in response to British attacks on Italian positions in Libya. While they were at sea, the British submarine HMS Odin unsuccessfully attacked Fiume and her sister Gorizia. On 6 July, a convoy left Naples, bound for North Africa; the following day, Italian reconnaissance reported a British cruiser squadron to have arrived in Malta. The Italian naval high command therefore ordered the 1st Division and several other cruisers and destroyers to join the escort for the convoy. The battleships Conte di Cavour and Giulio Cesare provide distant support. Two days later, the Italian fleet briefly clashed with the British Mediterranean Fleet in an inconclusive action off Calabria.

In late September, the Italian fleet, including Fiume, made a sweep for a British troop convoy from Alexandria to Malta, but it made no contact with the British ships. Fiume was present in the harbor at Taranto when the British fleet launched the nighttime carrier strike on Taranto on the night of 11–12 November, but she was not attacked in the raid. Another attempt to intercept a British convoy in late November resulted in the Battle of Cape Spartivento. The Italian fleet left port on 26 November and clashed with the British fleet the next day, in an engagement that lasted for about an hour. Campioni broke off the action because he mistakenly believed he was facing a superior force, the result of poor aerial reconnaissance. The British heavy cruiser HMS Berwick was hit twice by 203 mm rounds during the engagement, either fired by Fiume or her sister Pola.

==== Battle of Cape Matapan ====
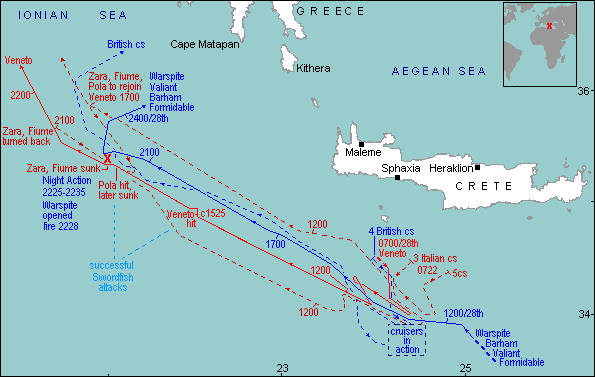
Map of the movements of the Italian and British fleets during the Battle of Cape Matapan

The Italian fleet, now commanded by Admiral Angelo Iachino, made another attempt to intercept a British convoy in late March 1941. The fleet was supported by the Regia Aeronautica and the German 10th Air Corps. This operation resulted in the Battle of Cape Matapan; early in the battle, Fiume and the rest of the 1st Division were to the northeast of the rest of the Italian fleet, which had encountered the British to the southwest. The battleship Vittorio Veneto was torpedoed by British aircraft and forced to withdraw during this phase of the battle. The 1st Division remained on the port side of the Italian fleet as it began its return to port to screen against another possible British attack. A second British airstrike later in the day failed to locate the retiring Vittorio Veneto and instead torpedoed Pola, which left the cruiser immobilized. Fiume, Zara, and four destroyers were detached to protect Pola. The British fleet, centered on the battleships Valiant, Warspite, and Barham, was at this point only 50 nmi (93 km; 58 mi) away.

Guided by radar, the British fleet closed in on the crippled Pola in the darkness while Fiume, Zara, and the destroyers approached from the opposite direction. At 10:27, the searchlights aboard Warspite, the leading British battleship, illuminated Fiume at a range of 2,900 yards (2,700 m), followed immediately by a salvo of six 15-inch (380 mm) shells from her main battery; five struck Fiume and caused serious damage. Her superfiring rear turret was blown overboard before a second salvo from Warspite struck the ship. Shortly thereafter, Valiant fired four 15-inch shells into Fiume, causing further devastation. Fiume, now a burning wreck, was spared further destruction as the British battleships turned their attention to Zara. Fiume fell out of line, listing badly to starboard, as Zara was similarly hammered by 15-inch broadsides. Fiume remained afloat for about 45 minutes before she capsized and sank stern first at 23:15. Two of the destroyers, Alfieri and Carducci, were also sunk, as were Zara and Pola. The action had lasted a mere three minutes. 812 men were lost with Fiume, among them her commanding officer Capt. Giorgio Giorgis; the survivors were picked up by British destroyers on the following morning, Greek destroyers in the evening of 29 March and the Italian hospital ship Gradisca between 31 March and 3 April.
