= Italian cruiser Pola =

Heavy cruiser of the Italian Royal Navy

Coordinates: 35°19′N 20°59′E

- Pola underway, date unknown

History

Italy
- Name: Pola
- Namesake: Pola
- Builder: O.T.O., Livorno
- Laid down: 17 March 1931
- Launched: 5 December 1931
- Commissioned: 21 December 1932
- Stricken: 18 October 1946
- Fate: Sunk, 29 March 1941

General characteristics
- Class & type: Zara-class cruiser
- Displacement: Full load: 14,133 long tons (14,360 t)
- Length: 182.8 m (599 ft 9 in)
- Beam: 20.6 m (67 ft 7 in)
- Draft: 7.2 m (23 ft 7 in)
- Installed power: 8 × 3-drum Yarrow boilers; 95,000 shp (71,000 kW)
- Propulsion: 2 × Parsons steam turbines
- Speed: 32 knots (59 km/h; 37 mph)
- Range: 5,361 nmi (9,929 km; 6,169 mi) at 16 knots (30 km/h; 18 mph)
- Complement: 841
- Armament: 8 × 203 mm (8 in)/53 cal. guns; 16 × 100 mm (4 in) / 47 caliber guns; 4 × Vickers-Terni 40 mm/39 guns; 8 × 12.7 mm machine guns
- Armor: Deck: 70 mm (2.8 in); Belt: 150 mm (5.9 in); Turret faces: 150 mm; Barbettes: 150 mm
- Aircraft carried: 2

Pola was a Zara-class heavy cruiser of the Italian Regia Marina (Royal Navy), named after the Italian city of Pola (now Pula, Croatia). She was built in the Odero Terni Orlando shipyard in Livorno in the early 1930s and entered service in 1932. She was the fourth and last ship in the class, which also included Zara, Fiume, and Gorizia. Compared to her sisters, Pola was built as a flagship with a larger conning tower to accommodate an admiral's staff. Like her sisters, she was armed with a battery of eight 203-millimeter (8.0 in) guns and was capable of a top speed of 32 knots (59 km/h; 37 mph).

Pola initially served as the flagship of the 2nd Squadron, and in 1940 she led the squadron during the battles of Calabria and Cape Spartivento, in July and November, respectively. During the latter engagement she briefly battled the British cruiser HMS Berwick. Pola was thereafter reassigned to the 3rd Division, along with her three sister ships. The ship took part in the Battle of Cape Matapan in late March 1941. During the battle, she was disabled by a British aerial torpedo. Later, in a fierce night engagement in the early hours of 29 March, Pola, Zara, Fiume, and two destroyers were sunk by the British Mediterranean Fleet with heavy loss of life.

== Design ==
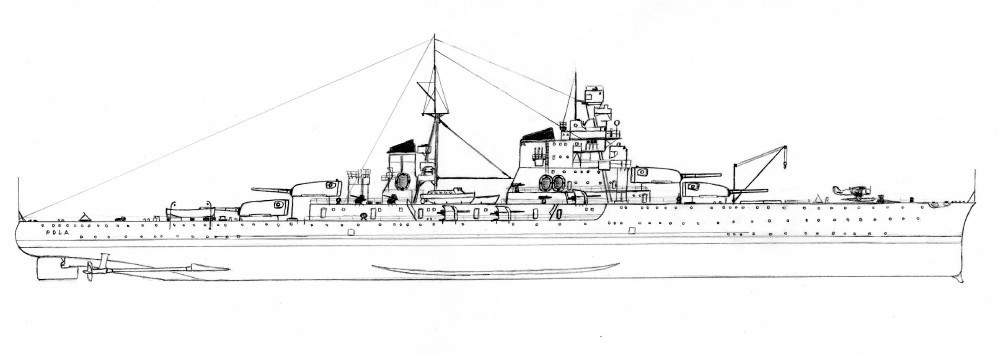
Profile drawing of Pola

Pola was 182.8 meters (600 ft) long overall, with a beam of 20.62 m (67.7 ft) and a draft of 7.2 m (24 ft). She displaced 14,133 long tons (14,360 t) at full load, though her displacement was nominally within the 10,000-long-ton (10,000 t) restriction set in place by the Washington Naval Treaty. Her power plant consisted of two Parsons steam turbines powered by eight oil-fired Yarrow boilers, which were trunked into two funnels amidships. Her engines were rated at 95,000 shaft horsepower (71,000 kW) and produced a top speed of 32 knots (59 km/h; 37 mph). She had a crew of 841 officers and enlisted men. Pola was designed to function as a squadron flagship, and so her forward superstructure was larger than that of her sisters, and was faired into the forward funnel.

She was protected with an armor belt that was 150 mm (5.9 in) thick amidships. Her armor deck was 70 mm (2.8 in) thick in the central portion of the ship and reduced to 20 mm (0.79 in) at either end. The gun turrets had 150 mm thick plating on the faces and the barbettes they sat in were also 150 mm thick. The main conning tower had 150 mm thick sides.

Pola was armed with a main battery of eight 203 mm (8 in) Mod 29 53-caliber guns in four gun turrets. The turrets were arranged in superfiring pairs forward and aft. Anti-aircraft defense was provided by a battery of sixteen 100 mm (4 in) 47-cal. guns in twin mounts, four Vickers-Terni 40 mm/39 guns in single mounts and eight 12.7 mm (0.50 in) guns in twin mounts. She carried a pair of IMAM Ro.43 seaplanes for aerial reconnaissance; the hangar was located under the forecastle and a fixed catapult was mounted on the centerline at the bow.

Pola's secondary battery was revised several times during her career. Two of the 100 mm guns and all of the 40 mm and 12.7 mm guns were removed in the late 1930s and eight 37 mm (1.5 in) 54-cal. guns and eight 13.2 mm (0.52 in) guns were installed in their place. Two 120 mm (4.7 in) 15-cal. star shell guns were added in 1940.

== History ==
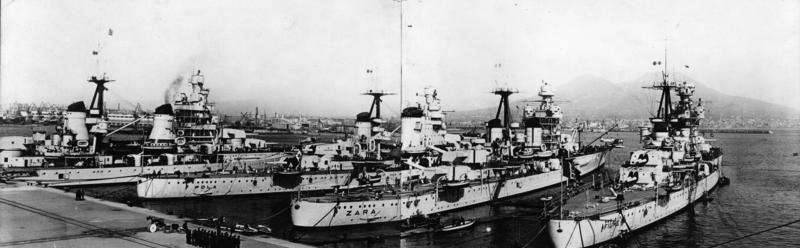
Pola (third from right) along with Zara and Fiume in Naples in 1938

Pola, named for the eponymous city seized by Italy after World War I, was laid down at the Odero-Terni-Orlando shipyard in Livorno on 17 March 1931 and was launched on 5 December that year. Fitting-out work proceeded quickly, and the new cruiser entered service just over a year later at her commissioning on 21 December 1932. Pola participated in a naval review in the Gulf of Naples, where she hosted Italy's fascist dictator, Benito Mussolini, on 6–7 July 1933. On 29 July 1934 she was formally given her battle flag in a ceremony in her namesake city. On 3 September 1936 she left Gaeta, bound for Spanish waters; she thereafter began a non-intervention patrol during the Spanish Civil War. From 10 September to 3 October, she was stationed in Palma de Mallorca to safeguard Italian interests there. Pola returned to Gaeta on 4 October.

Pola went on a short cruise to Italian Libya on 10–12 March 1937, with Mussolini aboard. On 7 June, she took part in a naval review in the Gulf of Naples held for the visiting German Field Marshal Werner von Blomberg. Another review took place on 5 May 1938 when the German dictator Adolf Hitler made a state visit to Italy. On 7 March 1939, Pola and her sisterships sortied from Taranto to intercept a squadron of Republican warships—three cruisers and eight destroyers—attempting to reach the Black Sea. The Italian ships were ordered not to open fire but merely to try to impede the progress of the Spanish ships and force them to dock at Augusta, Sicily. The Spanish commander refused and instead steamed to Bizerte in French Tunisia, where his ships were interned. The next month, on 7–9 April, Pola provided gunfire support to Italian forces occupying Albania.

=== World War II ===
At Italy's entrance into the Second World War on 10 June 1940, Pola was assigned as the flagship of Admiral Riccardo Paladini, commander of the 2nd Squadron, which also included the two Trento-class cruisers in the 2nd Division, three light cruisers in the 7th Division, and seventeen destroyers. Pola's first wartime operation was to cover a group of minelayers on the night of 10–11 June. She refueled at Messina and departed on 12 June, along with the rest of the 2nd Squadron and the 1st Squadron. The ships sortied in response to British attacks on Italian positions in Libya. On 6 July, Pola and the rest of the 2nd Squadron escorted a convoy bound for North Africa; the following day, Italian reconnaissance reported a British cruiser squadron to have arrived in Malta. The Italian naval high command therefore ordered several other cruisers and destroyers from the 1st Squadron to join the escort for the convoy. The battleships Conte di Cavour and Giulio Cesare provided distant support. Two days later, the Italian battleships briefly clashed with the British Mediterranean Fleet in an inconclusive action off Calabria. During the action, Pola engaged British cruisers but neither side scored any hits. From 30 July to 1 August, Pola, Trento, and Gorizia escorted a convoy to Libya. On 16 August she conducted live fire training off Naples, and at the end of the month she was transferred from Naples to Taranto.

In late September, the Italian fleet, including Pola, made a sweep for a British troop convoy from Alexandria to Malta, but it made no contact with the British ships. On 1 November, Mussolini visited the ship in Taranto. Pola was present in the harbor at Taranto when the British fleet launched the nighttime carrier strike on Taranto on the night of 11–12 November, but she was not attacked in the raid. She and the rest of the fleet left for Naples the following morning. Another attempt to intercept a British convoy in late November resulted in the Battle of Cape Spartivento. The Italian fleet left port on 26 November and while en route to the British fleet, Pola and the battleship Vittorio Veneto were attacked by Swordfish torpedo bombers from the carrier HMS Ark Royal, but both ships evaded the torpedoes. The two fleets then clashed in an engagement that lasted for about an hour. According to some sources, the two 203 mm hits on the British cruiser HMS Berwick which disabled one of her main battery turrets were fired by Pola. Other authors state instead that Berwick was actually damaged by the main guns of Pola's sister, the heavy cruiser Fiume. Admiral Inigo Campioni broke off the action because he mistakenly believed he was facing a superior force, the result of poor aerial reconnaissance.

The Italian fleet was reorganized on 9 December, and Pola joined her three sister ships in the 3rd Division of the 1st Squadron, which was now commanded by Admiral Angelo Iachino. On 14 December, a British air raid on Naples slightly damaged Pola. Two bombs hit the ship, both amidships on the port side. The hits damaged three of the ship's boilers and caused significant flooding and a significant list to port. Pola was drydocked on 16 December for repair work that lasted until 7 February 1941. She returned to Taranto on 13 February, and she joined Zara and Fiume for extensive maneuvers off Taranto on 11–17 March. A nighttime training operation followed on 23–24 March.

==== Battle of Cape Matapan ====
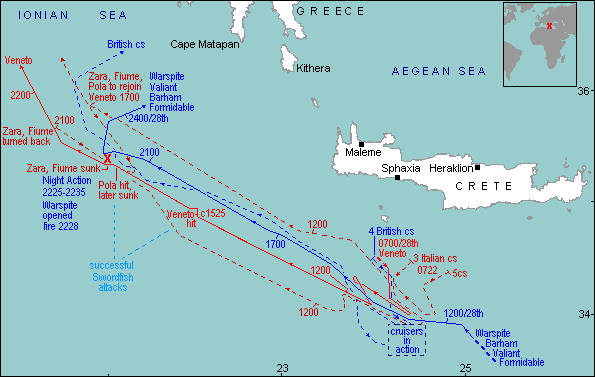
Map of the movements of the Italian and British fleets during the Battle of Cape Matapan

The Italian fleet made another attempt to intercept a British convoy in the eastern Mediterranean south of Crete in late March. This operation resulted in the Battle of Cape Matapan on 27–29 March. For most of the daytime engagement, Pola and the rest of the 3rd Division were stationed on the disengaged side of the Italian fleet, and so did not see action during this phase. Vittorio Veneto was torpedoed by British aircraft from the carrier Formidable and was forced to withdraw, and the 3rd Division remained on the port side of the Italian fleet to screen against another possible British attack. A second British airstrike later in the day failed to locate the retiring Vittorio Veneto and instead scored a single torpedo strike on Pola, hitting her amidships on her starboard side. In the confusion of the attack, Pola had nearly collided with Fiume and had been forced to stop, which had prevented her from taking evasive action. The damage filled three compartments with water and disabled five of her boilers and the main steam line that fed the turbines, leaving her immobilized and unable to use her main guns as the turrets were impossible to move due to the loss of power.

Iachino was unaware of Pola's plight until 20:10 on 28 March; upon learning of the situation he detached Fiume, Zara, and four destroyers to protect Pola. At around the same time, the British cruiser HMS Orion detected Pola on her radar and reported her location. The British fleet, centered on the battleships Valiant, Warspite, and Barham, was at this point only 50 nmi (93 km; 58 mi) away. The British ships, guided by radar, closed in on the Italians; at 22:10, Pola was about 6 nautical miles (11 km; 6.9 mi) from Valiant. Lookouts on the crippled Italian cruiser spotted shapes approaching and assumed them to be friendly vessels, so they fired a red flare to guide them. Almost twenty minutes later, the British illuminated first Zara and then Fiume with their searchlights; the British battleships obliterated Fiume, Zara, and two destroyers in a point-blank engagement.

Pola initially was left alone during the action, and her captain, assuming that his ship would be the next target (and unable to return fire), ordered his crew to open the seacocks and abandon ship. About ten minutes after midnight, the destroyer Havock discovered Pola, still without power, in the darkness. A flotilla of British destroyers rushed to the scene, first discovering the wrecked Zara, which was still afloat; she was torpedoed and sunk by the destroyer Jervis. After picking up survivors, the destroyers joined Havock and a boarding party was prepared to take Pola, though it was discovered that most of her crew had jumped into the water, and the remaining men were huddled on the forecastle, ready to surrender. Jervis took off the surviving 22 officers and 236 enlisted men from Pola. Then the destroyer HMS Nubian torpedoed the ship while Jervis illuminated her with her searchlights. Pola's magazines exploded and she sank at 04:03 on 29 March. A total of 328 men went down with the ship. Pola was formally stricken from the naval register on 18 October 1946.
