= Italian ship Vittorio Veneto =

Italian ship Vittorio Veneto may refer to:

- Italian battleship Vittorio Veneto - a Littorio-class battleship
- Italian cruiser Vittorio Veneto - a unique helicopter carrying cruiser
