= Italian battleship Impero =

Fast battleship of the Italian Royal Navy

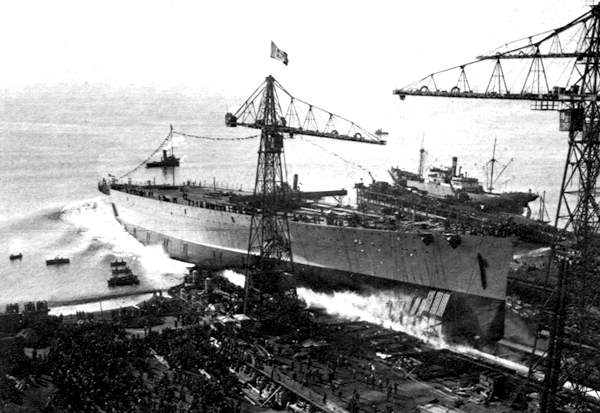
- Impero at her launching on 15 November 1939

History

Italy
- Name: Impero
- Namesake: Italian Empire
- Builder: Ansaldo, Genoa
- Laid down: 14 May 1938
- Launched: 15 November 1939
- Fate: Scrapped 1948–1950, in Venice

General characteristics
- Class & type: Littorio-class battleship
- Displacement: Full load: 45,485 long tons (46,215 t)
- Length: 240.7 m (789 ft 8 in)
- Beam: 32.9 m (107 ft 11 in)
- Draft: 9.6 m (31 ft 6 in)
- Installed power: 8 × Yarrow boilers; 128,200 shp (95,600 kW)
- Propulsion: 4 × steam turbines; 4 × screw propellers
- Speed: 30 kn (56 km/h; 35 mph)
- Complement: (planned) 1,920
- Armament: 9 × 381 mm (15 in) guns; 12 × 152 mm (6 in) guns; 4 × 120 mm (4.7 in)/40 guns; 12 × 90 mm (3.5 in) anti-aircraft guns; 20 × 37 mm (1.5 in) guns; 20 × 20 mm (0.79 in) guns
- Armor: Main belt: 350 mm (14 in); Deck: 162 mm (6.4 in); Turrets: 350 mm; Conning tower: 260 mm (10 in)
- Aircraft carried: 3 aircraft (IMAM Ro.43 or Reggiane Re.2000)
- Aviation facilities: 1 stern catapult

Impero was the fourth Littorio-class battleship built for Italy's Regia Marina (Royal Navy) during the Second World War. She was named after the Italian word for "empire", in this case referring to the newly (1936) conquered Italian Empire in East Africa (Somaliland, Eritrea and Ethiopia territories) as a result of the Second Italo-Abyssinian War. She was constructed under the order of the 1938 Naval Expansion Program, along with her sister ship Roma.

Impero was laid down in May 1938 and launched in November 1939. The entrance of Italy into World War II forced the Regia Marina to refocus its construction priorities on escort warships, so Impero was left incomplete. After Italy surrendered to the Allies on 8 September 1943, the rest of the Italian Navy steamed to Sardinia to rendezvous with their American contemporaries. Still incomplete in Trieste, Impero was captured by the Germans, who used the hulk for target practice. Sunk by Allied bombers in February 1945, she was refloated in 1947 and scrapped in Venice from 1948 to 1950.

== Background ==
The Italian leader Benito Mussolini did not authorize any large naval rearmament until 1933. Once he did, two old battleships of the Conte di Cavour class were sent to be modernized in the same year, and Vittorio Veneto and Littorio were laid down in 1934. In May 1935, the Italian Naval Ministry began preparing for a five-year naval building program that would include four battleships, three aircraft carriers, four cruisers, fifty-four submarines, and forty smaller ships. In December 1935, Admiral Domenico Cavagnari proposed to Mussolini that, among other things, two more battleships of the Littorio class be built to attempt to counter a possible Franco-British alliance—if the two countries combined forces, they would easily outnumber the Italian fleet. Mussolini postponed his decision, but later authorized planning for the two ships in January 1937 for the 1938 Naval Expansion Program. In December, they were approved and money was appropriated for them; they were named Roma and Impero.

== Description ==
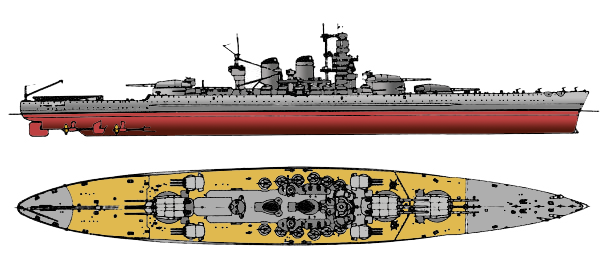
Line-drawing of the Littorio class

Impero was 240.68 meters (789 ft 8 in) long overall and had a beam of 32.82 m (107 ft 8 in) and a draft of 9.6 m (31 ft 6 in). She was designed with a standard displacement of 40,992 long tons (41,650 t); at full combat loading, she displaced 45,485 long tons (46,215 t). The ship was to be powered by four Belluzo geared steam turbines rated at 128,000 shaft horsepower (95,000 kW). Steam was provided by eight oil-fired Yarrow boilers. The engines provided a top speed of 30 knots (56 km/h; 35 mph) and a range of 3,920 mi (6,310 km; 3,410 nmi) at 20 kn (37 km/h; 23 mph). Impero would have had a crew of 1,830 to 1,950 if she had been completed.

Impero's main armament would have consisted of nine 381 mm (15 in) 50-caliber Model 1934 guns in three triple turrets; two turrets were placed forward in a superfiring arrangement and the third was located aft. Her secondary anti-surface armament would have consisted of twelve 152 mm (6 in) 55-caliber Model 1934/35 guns in four triple turrets amidships. These were to be supplemented by four 120 mm (4.7 in) 40-caliber Model 1891/92 guns in single mounts; these guns were old weapons and were primarily intended to fire star shells. Impero was intended to be equipped with an anti-aircraft battery that comprised twelve 90 mm (3.5 in) 50-caliber Model 1938 guns in single mounts, twenty 37 mm (1.5 in) 54-caliber guns in eight twin and four single mounts, and sixteen 20 mm (0.79 in) 65-caliber guns in eight twin mounts.

The ship was protected by a main armor belt that was 280 mm (11 in) with a second layer of steel that was 70 mm (2.8 in) thick. The main deck was 162 mm (6.4 in) thick in the central area of the ship and reduced to 45 mm (1.8 in) in less critical areas. The main battery turrets were 350 mm (14 in) thick and the lower turret structure was housed in barbettes that were also 350 mm thick. The secondary turrets had 280 mm thick faces and the conning tower had 260 mm (10 in) thick sides. Impero was to be fitted with a catapult on her stern and equipped with three IMAM Ro.43 reconnaissance float planes or Reggiane Re.2000 fighters.

== History ==
Impero under German control in 1943

Authorized to be built by Ansaldo of Genoa, the new battleship's keel was laid down on 14 May 1938 and launched on 15 November 1939. At her launching, she was christened Impero, after Italy's empire in Africa. With Genoa being in bombing range of France, and war now a definite possibility, Impero was moved to Brindisi on 8 June 1940 due to fears of a French attack. Trieste was considered a better location, but Roma was fitting out there and the shipyard could not handle two battleships at once. While at Brindisi, some of her machinery was installed, along with parts of her smaller caliber weaponry. Despite the intent to move Impero to a safer location, Brindisi was still hit by Allied bombers, though Impero was not damaged. Nevertheless, the Regia Marina decided to shift production priorities to desperately needed escorts for merchant convoys. As a result, construction of Impero was delayed to expedite those ships. The only work done was the fitting of the engines and some gun mountings.

Fitted with small-caliber anti-aircraft and anti-surface weaponry, Impero was sailed—using her own propulsion—to Venice on 22 January 1942. At some later time, she was moved again to Trieste, though no further work was done on the ship. After Italy's capitulation to the Allies in September 1943, Impero was seized by the Germans, who intended to break her up for scrap. This was evidently never completed, as Allied forces discovered the half-sunk hulk in Trieste after the war. The Germans had instead used her as a target ship and the Allies had damaged her during an air attack on 20 February 1945. Impero was stricken from the naval register on 27 March 1947. The hulk was raised sometime that year and towed to Venice and beached, where she was scrapped from 1948 to 1950.

At the time of the capitulation, Impero's hull was 88% complete and the engines were 76% complete, but overall the ship was only 28% complete; it would have required about eighteen more months of work for the ship to be finished. Key features like the armament, electrical wiring and a reworking of the bridge had still not been completed.
