= Cannone da 381/50 Ansaldo M1934 =

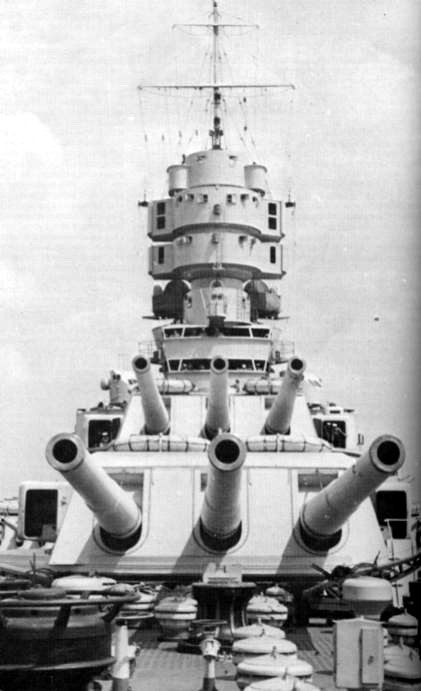
- 381/50 M1934 guns on the Vittorio Veneto
- Type: Naval gun
- Place of origin: Kingdom of Italy

Service history
- In service: 1940–1948
- Used by: Regia Marina
- Wars: Second World War

Production history
- Manufacturer: Gio. Ansaldo & C., OTO
- No. built: 40

Specifications
- Mass: 102.4 t (101 long tons)
- Length: 20.72 metres (68 ft 0 in)
- Barrel length: 19.05 m (62 ft 6 in)
- Shell: AP: 885 kg (1,950 lb); HE: 774 kg (1,710 lb)
- Caliber: 381 mm (15 in)
- Breech: Welin breech block
- Muzzle velocity: 850–870 m/s (2,800–2,900 ft/s)
- Maximum firing range: 42,260 m (46,220 yd)

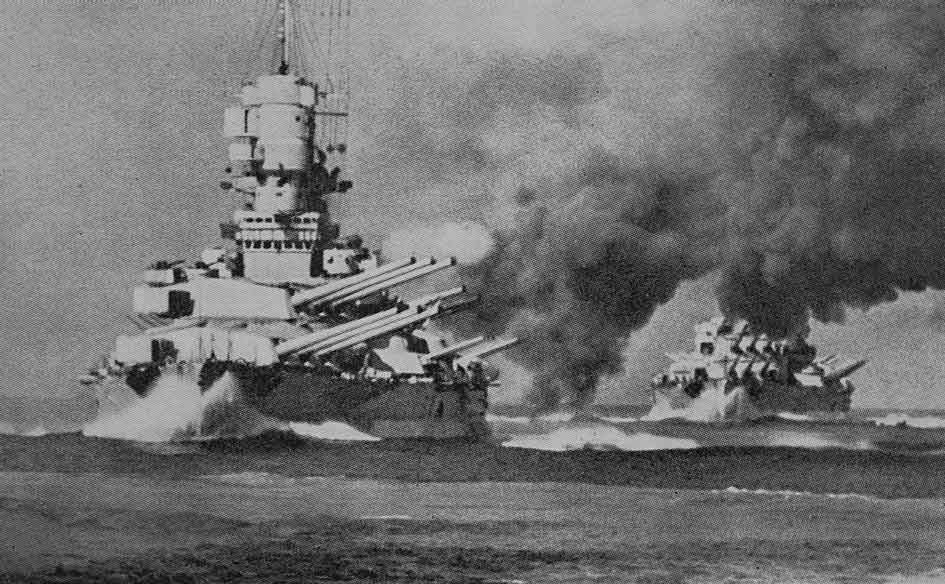
381/50 guns of Vittorio Veneto and Littorio

The Cannone da 381/50 Ansaldo M1934 was a 381-millimeter (15 in), 50-caliber naval gun designed and built for the Royal Italian Navy (Regia Marina) by Gio. Ansaldo & C. in the 1930s. The gun served as the main armament of Italy's last battleships, the Littorio class. These built-up guns consisted of a liner, a cylinder over the chamber and part of the rifle bore, a full-length cylinder, and a 3/4 length jacket with a hydro-pneumatically operated side-swinging Welin breech block. 40 barrels were produced in total by Ansaldo and O.T.O., but none survive to this day. Each battleship carried nine guns mounted in three triple turrets with maximum elevation of 35°. Time between salvos was approximately 45 seconds.

== Ammunition ==
=== Propellent Charges ===
Propellent charges were in 44 kg (97 lb) cotton or silk waste bags ('wrappers'). The charges were made from either N.A.C. type powder (produced by Dinamite Nobel) or F.C. 4 (produced by Bombrini-Parodi-Delfino). Each wrapper also had a small disc-shaped charge in it that was more sensitive, to ensure ignition. Bags were typically rammed in two 3-bag groups. The guns had three charges:

Charge 1: Combat charge, this used six wrappers.

Charge 2: For coastal bombardment or practice, it used three to four wrappers depending on the shells, in order to decrease barrel wear.

Charge 3: Practice only

The barrel life of these guns was rated at 140 EFC (Effective Full Charges), or 110-130 EFC according to other sources.

=== Shells ===
Three types of shells were developed for the gun, but only two were actually used.

AP: The primary armor-piercing round, in Italian these rounds were known as "Palla" (literally; "ball") or "Proiettile Perforante" (Piercing Shot"). They were heavy for their caliber at 884.8 kg (1,951 lb), with a small bursting charge of only 10.16 kg TNT (1.15%). The shells were made of nickel-chrome steel, with a steel cap and a Silumin ballistic cap. The total length was 170 cm (67 in), or 4.46 calibers.

SAP: A semi armor-piercing round named "Granata Perforante" ("Piercing Shell") designed for use against lightly armored targets such as cruisers and destroyers. They were lighter than the AP shells with a greater bursting charge (3.57%), and had a significantly lesser penetrative ability. During the war, they showed an unfortunate tendency to fuse later than they had been set to, which lead to over-penetrations of their targets.

HE: High explosive shells, these weighed only 774 kilograms (1,710 lb). Although designed and tested for these guns, they were never actually used aboard any of the ships that mounted these guns. The nose fuse was thought to be too sensitive.

Shell Type	Mass	Bursting Charge	Fuse Type	Muzzle Velocity	Range
AP	884.8 kg (1,951 lb)	10.16 kg (22.4 lb)	Delayed-Action Base Fuse	850 m/s (2,800 ft/s)	42,800 m (46,800 yd) @ 36º
SAP	824.3 kg (1,817 lb)	29.515 kg (65.07 lb)	Delayed-Action Base Fuse	880 m/s (2,900 ft/s)	44,640 m (48,820 yd) @ 35º
HE	774 kg (1,706 lb)	????	Instantaneous Nose Fuse	????	????

== Shell trajectory ==
Range	Elevation	Descent	Impact velocity
10 km (6.2 mi)	4° 24′	5°	687 m/s (2250 ft/s)
15 km (9.3 mi)	7° 12′	8° 39′	620 m/s (2030 ft/s)
20 km (12 mi)	10° 36′	13° 24′	563 m/s (1850 ft/s)
25 km (16 mi)	14° 27′	19° 18′	524 m/s (1720 ft/s)
30 km (19 mi)	19° 12′	26° 6′	498 m/s (1630 ft/s)
35 km (22 mi)	24° 39′	37° 36′	483 m/s (1590 ft/s)

== Performance ==
These guns were mounted triple turrets, each ship mounting three turrets. Each gun was mounted in an individual cradle, and could be operated independently of each other. However, due to the Italian preference of turret salvoes on the Littorio-class, the guns typically operated as one. The guns could depress to a minimum of -5º, and elevate to a maximum of +36º, at a rate of 6º per second. The entire turret, weighing some 1,591.4 tonnes, was traversed at the same rate.

Loading was carried out at a fixed elevation of +15º, and used three strokes. The main rammer's first stroke inserted the projectile, and the next two would insert the propellant charges (three per stroke). In the event of damage to the main rammer, a backup could be used at -2º elevation. However, this resulted in a slower loading process. The average rate of fire was 45 seconds (1.3 rpm) per gun at typical elevations, but this could be done at much lower rates. In 1940–1941 gunnery exercises Littorio averaged 30.6 seconds at 18.8 km, and Vittorio Veneto 29.7 seconds at 20.0 km - 1.96 rpm and 2.02 rpm respectively (achieved firing with the Charge 2).

The guns were the most powerful weapons of their caliber, comparable to those of much greater caliber. This was largely due to their exceptional muzzle velocity, although this came at a cost. The high velocity and energies in the firing chamber lead to a much faster rate of barrel wear compared to other naval guns, and also resulted in excessive dispersion at long range. Because of this, the final velocity of the Palla rounds was reduced from 870 m/s to 850 m/s. Even with this reduced velocity, the 381/50 had the longest range of any rifles ever mounted on a battleship, the 884.8 kg AP rounds able to reach 42.8 km at the maximum elevation of +36º. This out-ranged the 46cm/45 Type 94 of the Yamato-class by almost 800 meters, and the 16"/50 Mk.7 of the Iowa-class by over 4000 meters. The armor-piercing shells had similar penetrative ability against vertical (belt) armor to the two aforementioned weapons, but due to the shallow angle of impact and high velocity of the shells, their performance against horizontal (deck) armor was far inferior.

== Production and Fate of the Guns ==
The guns were produced in two twenty-gun batches, the first for the original two Littorio-class battleships (Littorio and Vittorio Veneto), and the second batch, designated Modello 1939, were produced for the next pair of battleships, Impero and Roma. Of the first pair, manufacturing was split evenly between Ansaldo and O.T.O (Nine guns per ship, with one spare barrel each), but for the second production run, Ansaldo only built five, while O.T.O built the other fifteen.

Of the original production, the Ansaldo guns armed the battleship Littorio, while Vittorio Veneto was armed with the O.T.O guns. Of the second group, Impero was to receive (but never did, as she was never completed) O.T.O. guns, while Roma had one turret utilizing Ansaldo-manufactured guns, with the other two using those made by O.T.O.

Of the forty guns, nine went down with the battleship Roma when she was sunk in September 1943. Eighteen more were scrapped alongside the battleships Italia (ex-Littorio) and Vittorio Veneto in 1948. Of the remaining thirteen (the nine guns meant for Impero and four reserve guns), their fate is less clear. It is believed that some of Impero's guns were seized by Nazi Germany for use in the Atlantic Wall, while any remaining guns would have been scrapped post-war in accordance with Article 51 of the Peace Treaty of 1947 (As the range of these guns far exceeded the 30 km limit allowed).

== See also ==
=== Weapons of comparable role, performance and era ===
- 380 mm/45 Modèle 1935 gun : French equivalent
- 38 cm SK C/34 naval gun : German equivalent

== Notes ==
=== Bibliography ===
- Bagnasco, Erminio; de Toro, Augusto (2011). The Littorio Class: Italy's Last and Largest Battleships 1937-1948. Barnsley, UK: Seaforth Publishing. ISBN 978-1-59114-445-8.
- Breyer, Siegfried (1973). Battleships and Battle Cruisers 1905–1970. Garden City, New York: Doubleday and Company. ISBN 0-385-07247-3.
- Campbell, John (1985). Naval Weapons of World War Two. Annapolis, Maryland: Naval Institute Press. ISBN 0-87021-459-4.
- Santarini, Marco (December 2020). "Gunfire Dispersion of Large Italian Naval Guns: The Strange Case of the 381/50 Ansaldo-OTO mod. 1934 Gun". Warship International. LVII (4): 303–327. ISSN 0043-0374.
