= Battle of Taranto =

1940 British naval victory over Italy in WWII

- Part of the Battle of the Mediterranean of the Second World War
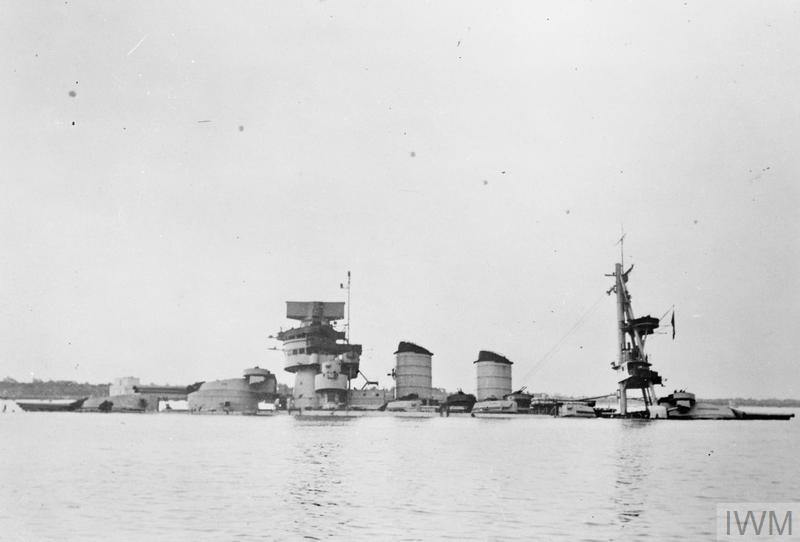
- The Italian battleship Conte di Cavour with hull awash after being torpedoed during the Taranto raid.
Date	11/12 November 1940
Location	Taranto 40°27′4″N 17°12′27″E
Result	British victory

Belligerents
United Kingdom	Italy

Commanders and leaders
Andrew Cunningham; Lumley Lyster	Inigo Campioni

Strength
1 aircraft carrier; 2 heavy cruisers; 2 light cruisers; 4 destroyers; 21 torpedo bombers	6 battleships; 7 heavy cruisers; 7 light cruisers; 13 destroyers

Casualties and losses
2 killed; 2 captured; 2 aircraft destroyed	59 killed; 600 wounded; 3 battleships disabled; 1 heavy cruiser damaged; 2 destroyers damaged; 2 fighters destroyed
- Port of Taranto, in Apulia, Southern Italy, the main Italian naval base

The Battle of Taranto, also known as the Raid on Taranto, and Operation Judgement took place on the night of 11/12 November 1940 during the Second World War between British naval forces (Admiral Andrew Cunningham) and Italian naval forces (Admiral Inigo Campioni). The Royal Navy launched the first all-aircraft ship-to-ship naval attack, employing 21 Fairey Swordfish biplane torpedo-bombers from the aircraft carrier HMS Illustrious in the Mediterranean Sea.

The attack struck the battlefleet of the Regia Marina at anchor in the harbour of Taranto, using aerial torpedoes, despite the shallowness of the water. The success of this attack augured the ascendancy of naval aviation over big-gun battleships. According to Cunningham, "Taranto, and the night of 11/12 November 1940, should be remembered forever as having shown once and for all that in the Fleet Air Arm the Navy has its most devastating weapon".

== Background ==
=== Regia Marina ===
Since long before the First World War, the Italian Regia Marina's First Squadron had been based at Taranto, a port city on the Italian south-east coast. In the inter-war period, the Royal Navy made plans to counter the Regia Marina if there was a war in the Mediterranean. Plans for the capture of the port at Taranto were considered during the Italian invasion of Abyssinia in 1935.

After Italy entered the Second World War in 1940, British and Italian forces in North Africa were engaged in the Western Desert Campaign. Italian troops based in Libya required supplies from Italy. British forces in Egypt suffered greater supply difficulties. Before Italy entered the war, British convoys could traverse the Mediterranean from Gibraltar via Malta to Egypt. The threat from the Regia Marina and the Regia Aeronautica (the Italian air force) made this very difficult and British ships were routed down Africa, around the Cape of Good Hope, up the east coast of Africa and then through the Suez Canal to reach Alexandria.

Following the concept of a fleet in being, the Italians usually kept their warships in harbour and did not seek to engage the Royal Navy at sea; any ship they lost larger than a destroyer could not be replaced. The Italian fleet at Taranto was powerful, consisting of six battleships (though one was not yet battleworthy, Andrea Doria having her crew still in training after her reconstruction) seven heavy cruisers, two light cruisers and eight destroyers. This made the threat of a sortie against British shipping a serious problem.

=== Royal Navy ===
During the Munich Crisis of 1938, Admiral Sir Dudley Pound, the commander of the Mediterranean Fleet, was concerned about the survival of the aircraft carrier HMS Glorious in the face of Italian opposition in the Mediterranean and ordered his staff to re-examine plans for attacking Taranto. He was advised by Lumley Lyster, the captain of Glorious, that his Swordfish biplane torpedo bombers were capable of a night attack, the Fleet Air Arm (FAA) being the only naval aviation arm capable of such a feat. Pound took Lyster's advice and ordered training to begin. Security was kept so tight there were no written records. Just a month before the war began, Pound advised his replacement, Admiral Andrew Cunningham, to consider the possibility, that came to be known as Operation Judgement.

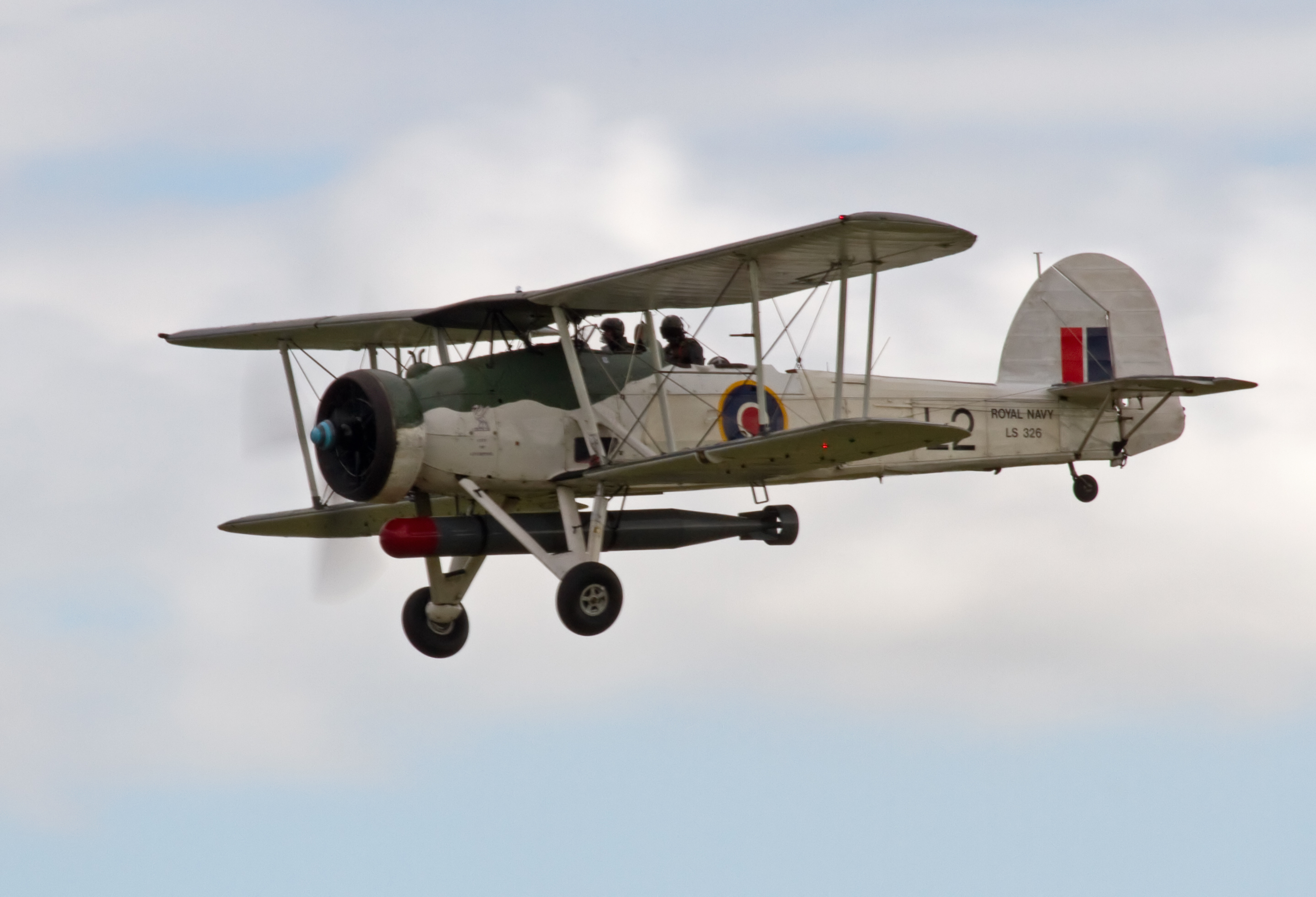
A restored Fairey Swordfish of the Fleet Air Arm

The fall of France and the consequent loss of the French Mediterranean Fleet (even before the Attack on Mers-el-Kébir (Operation Catapult) made redress essential. The older carrier, HMS Eagle, on Cunningham's strength, was ideal, possessing an experienced air group consisting entirely of Swordfish aircraft. Three Gloster Sea Gladiator fighters were added for the operation. Plans were drawn up after the Italian invasion of Egypt by the 10th Army halted at Sidi Barrani, which freed the British Mediterranean Fleet.

Operation Judgement was part of Operation MB8, naval convoy movements that covered the arrival of Taranto attack force ready for the operation. The operation was originally scheduled to take place on 21 October 1940, Trafalgar Day. HMS Illustrious (815 NAS and 819 NAS) and HMS Eagle (813 NAS and 824 NAS) would be able to provide 30 Swordfish between them. lIlustrious also carried Fairey Fulmar fighters of 806 NAS aboard to provide air cover for the force, with her radar and fighter control systems.

A fire in an auxiliary fuel tank of one Swordfish led to a delay; the minor fire spread and destroyed two Swordfish. Eagle then suffered a breakdown in the aviation fuel system on 4 November and was removed from the operation. When the new carrier HMS Illustrious, based at Alexandria, became available in the Mediterranean, she took on board five Swordfish from Eagle and launched the strike alone.

The force was commanded by Lyster, now a Rear-Admiral and Flag Officer, Mediterranean Aircraft Carriers, who had written the plan for the attack on Taranto. The flotilla consisted of Illustrious, the heavy cruisers HMS Berwick and York, the light cruisers HMS Gloucester and Glasgow and the destroyers Hasty, Havelock, Hyperion and Ilex. (Note: Hasty, Havelock and Ilex were the 2nd Destroyer Flotilla, Hyperion the 14th Destroyer Flotilla) The 24 Swordfish came from 813 Naval Air Squadron (813 NAS), 815 NAS, 819 NAS and 824 NAS. The small number of aircraft raised concern that Judgement would only alert the Regia Marina without achieving worthwhile results.

The normal range of the Swordfish was not enough to reach Taranto without bringing the carriers close to Italy and so they were fitted with extra fuel tanks: the torpedo-equipped Swordfish had 60 imp gal (270 L; 72 US gal) auxiliary fuel tanks fitted in the observer (navigator) position in the cockpit; the observer taking the radio operator/air gunner's place. (Note: The aircraft were going to maintain radio silence during the raid to protect the carrier's location and so the observer did not have radio duties as well) The other Swordfish had an auxiliary fuel tank mounted under the fuselage.

Half of the Swordfish were armed with torpedoes and the other half bombs and parachute flares for diversions, the flare aircraft carrying four bombs. The torpedoes were fitted with Duplex magnetic–contact exploders. These would trigger the warhead if the torpedo passed underneath a ship or if the torpedo hit. The exploders were extremely sensitive to rough seas though and there were concerns the torpedoes would hit the harbour bottom. The loss rate for the bombers was expected to be fifty per cent. (Note: As happened with the attacks on the Kriegsmarine battleship Bismarck later.)

Taranto harbour had a depth of only about 39 ft (12 m) but the Royal Navy had developed a new method of preventing torpedoes from diving too deep. A drum was attached beneath the nose of the aircraft, from which a roll of wire led to the nose of the torpedo. As it dropped, the tension from the wire pulled up the nose of the torpedo, producing a belly-flop rather than a nose dive.

Several reconnaissance flights by Martin Marylands of 431 General Reconnaissance Flight RAF, flying from Malta, confirmed the location of the Italian fleet. The flights produced photos on which the intelligence officer of Illustrious spotted unexpected barrage balloons and changed the plan. To make sure the Italian warships had not sortied, the British also sent over a Short Sunderland flying boat on the night of 11/12 November, just as the carrier task force was forming up off the Greek island of Cephalonia, about 170 nmi (310 km; 200 mi) from Taranto harbour. The reconnaissance flight alerted the Italian forces in southern Italy but since they were without radar, they could do little but wait. The Regia Marina could have gone to sea in search of British naval forces but this was against the naval philosophy of the Italians between January 1940 and September 1943. The complexity of Operation MB8, with its forces and convoys, deceived the Italians into thinking that only normal convoying was under way.

=== Taranto ===
The base of Taranto was defended by 101 anti-aircraft guns and 193 machine-guns. Usually it was protected against low-flying aircraft by large numbers of barrage balloons but only 27 were up on 11 November; strong winds on 6 November had blown away 60 balloons. The capital ships were also supposed to be protected by anti-torpedo nets but 12.8 km (8.0 mi) of netting was needed and only a third of that was rigged before the attack, due to a scheduled gunnery exercise. The nets did not reach the bottom of the harbour, allowing the British torpedoes to clear them by about 60 cm (24 in). The six Italian battleships and three of the heavy cruisers were in the outer harbour (Mar Grande) with two more heavy cruisers, four light cruisers and 17 destroyers in the inner harbour (Mar Piccolo). The smaller Italian vessels were moored stern onto the quays rather than alongside.

== Attack ==
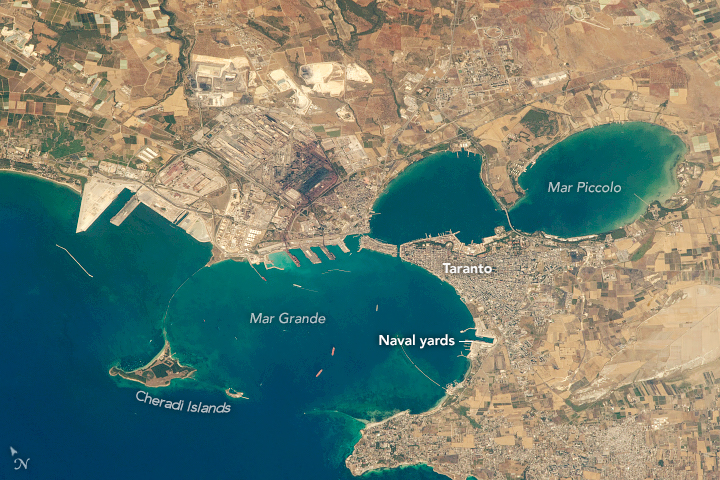
Taranto harbour seen from space showing the Mar Grande and Mar Piccolo

Illustrious and her escorts detached from Cunningham's force and at 20:00 Illustrious was 170 mi (270 km) from Taranto. The first wave was to fly in formation to north of the harbour then separate: the flare aircraft would backlight the battleships, the torpedo bombers attack the battleships and the dive bombers would target the smaller vessels in the Mar Piccolo. The first wave of 12 aircraft, led by Lieutenant Commander Kenneth "Hooch" Williamson RN of 815 NAS, took off from Illustrious from 20:30 hours on 11 November 1940, followed by a second wave of nine about an hour later. One of the second wave aircraft (L5F) was damaged on the flight deck and could not be launched until repaired, following on separately and unknown to the rest.

Of the second wave, one bombing aircraft turned back as its auxiliary fuel tank underneath detached from the aircraft ensuring the aircraft would not be able to complete the round trip, so only eight made it to the target. The first wave consisted of six Swordfish armed with torpedoes, two with flares, four with 250 lb (110 kg) bombs, and four with six bombs. It split into two sections when three of the bombers and one torpedo bomber strayed from the main force while flying through thin clouds. The smaller group continued to Taranto independently. The Italian defences, alerted by the listening posts, began a barrage before the aircraft arrived.

The main group arrived at the harbour at Mar Grande at about 11:00 p.m. An aircraft dropped 16 parachute flares east of the harbour, adding illumination to the moonlight, then the flare dropper and the assistant flare dropping aircraft dive bombed the port to set fire to oil tanks. (Note: L4P (Janvrin and Kiggell) and L5B (Lamb and Grieve) respectively. The latter did not drop flares as they were unnecessary.) The next three aircraft, led by Williamson in L4A (the other two were L4R and L4C) flew over San Pietro Island and struck the battleship Conte di Cavour with a torpedo, which blew a 27 ft (8.2 m) hole in her side below the waterline; anti-aircraft guns on the ship immediately shot down Williamson's aircraft which was only feet above the water. The two remaining aircraft in this sub-flight dodged barrage balloons and received massed anti-aircraft fire from the Italian warships and shore batteries as they pressed home their attack on the battleship Andrea Doria but missed. The next sub-flight of three attacked from a more northerly direction against the battleship Littorio, hitting it with two torpedoes and launched a torpedo at the flagship, the battleship Vittorio Veneto, that missed.

Attack directions of the Swordfish

The bomber force, led by Captain O. Patch RM in E5A, attacked next. They found the targets difficult to identify but attacked and hit two cruisers moored in Mar Piccolo bay, hitting both with a bomb each from 1,500 ft (460 m). They were followed by another aircraft, whose bombs straddled four destroyers. Forde in L4H made his attack twice in case the absence of visible hits on the first run meant they had not released. Sarra (L4L) attacked the seaplane base, hitting the hangars from 1,500ft.

The second wave of eight aircraft, led by Lieutenant Commander J. D. Hale of 819 NAS, was now approaching from a northerly direction towards Mar Grande harbour, with two of the four bombers also carrying flares, the remaining five carrying torpedoes. Flares were dropped shortly before midnight. Two aircraft aimed their torpedoes at Littorio, one of which hit. One aircraft, despite having been hit twice by anti-aircraft fire, aimed a torpedo at Vittorio Veneto but missed. Another aircraft hit the battleship Duilio with a torpedo, blowing a large hole in her hull and flooding both of her forward magazines.

The only aircraft lost from the second wave was flown by Lieutenant G. Bayley RN, that was shot down by anti-aircraft fire from the heavy cruiser Gorizia following the attack on Littorio. The final aircraft to arrive, 15 minutes behind the others, made an unsuccessful dive-bombing attack on one of the Italian cruisers, despite severe anti-aircraft fire, then safely returned to Illustrious, landing at 2:39 a.m. Of the two aircraft shot down, Williamson, and his observer Lieutenant N. J. 'Blood' Scarlett, were taken prisoner. The pilot and observer of the second aircraft (E4H), Lieutenant G. Bayley and Lieutenant H. Slaughter, were killed.

The Italian land batteries fired 13,489 shells and several thousand were fired by the ships. The anti-aircraft barrage was formidable, having 101 guns and 193 machine guns. Eighty-seven balloons were protecting the port but strong winds had caused the loss of 60 of them. About 4.2 km (2.6 mi) of anti-torpedo nets were protecting the ships, up to 10 m (33 ft) deep, while the need was for 12.8 km (8.0 mi). The defences included thirteen aerophonic (acoustic listening) stations and 22 searchlights (the ships had two searchlights each). Denis Boyd, the captain of Illustrious, wrote later, "It is notable that the enemy did not use the searchlights at all during either of the attacks". (Note: Boyd's Report was attached to an Intelligence Report filed with the Office of Naval Intelligence by Lt Commander John N Opie, III, USN. Opie's report is found at the National Archives, Record Group 38, A-1-z/22863D.)

Cunningham and Lyster were set on striking Taranto again the next night with Swordfish (six torpedo-bombers, seven bombers and two flare-droppers) but there was not general agreement. One wag in the pilots' room remarked, "They only asked the Light Brigade to do it once!" In the end, bad weather prevented a repeat of the attack.

== Otranto ==
Force X, the cruisers HMS Ajax, Orion and HMAS Sydney and the Tribal-class destroyers HMS Nubian and Mohawk attacked an Italian convoy just past midnight and destroyed the Italian merchantmen Capo Vado, Catalani, Locatelli and Premuda, damaging the torpedo-boat (a small First World War destroyer) Nicola Fabrizi, while the out-gunned auxiliary cruiser Ramb III fled.

== Aftermath ==
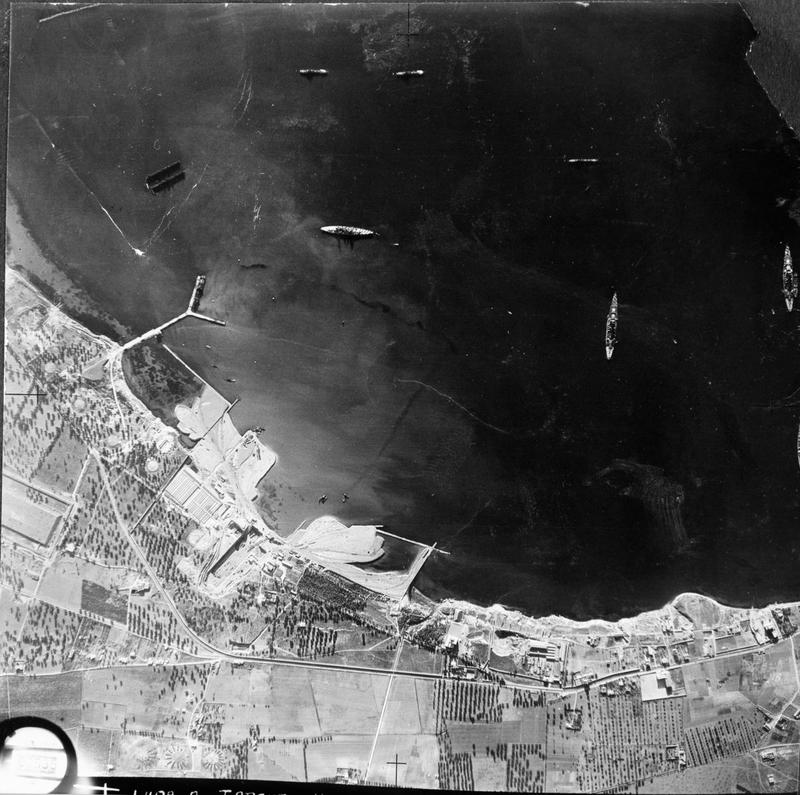
Aerial photo of Italian warships moored in Mar Grande harbour at Taranto. Note the 'Y' jetty.

The Italian battleships had suffered significant damage. Conte di Cavour had a 12 by 8 m (39 by 26 ft) hole in the hull, and permission to ground her was withheld until it was too late, so her keel touched the bottom at a greater depth than intended; 27 of the ship's crew were killed, and over 100 more wounded. Only her superstructure and main armament remained above water. She was raised, partially repaired and transferred to Trieste for further repairs and improvements but a changed situation made this work a low priority. She was still being repaired when Italy surrendered, so she never returned to full service. Duilio had only a slightly smaller hole [36 ft × 23 ft (11 m × 7 m)] and was saved by running her aground.

Littorio had considerable flooding caused by three torpedo hits. Despite underwater protection (the Pugliese torpedo defence system, standard in all Italian battleships), the damage was extensive, although damage to the ship's structures was relatively limited (its machinery was undamaged). Casualties were 32 crewmen killed and many wounded. She was holed in three places, one on the port side (7 m × 1.5 m [23.0 ft × 4.9 ft]) and two on the starboard side (49 ft × 33 ft [15 m × 10 m] and 39 ft × 30 ft [12 m × 9 m]). She was saved by being run aground. Despite this, in the morning, the ship's bows were submerged.

The Italian fleet lost half of its capital ships in one night; the next day, the Regia Marina transferred its undamaged ships from Taranto to Naples to protect them from similar attacks, until the defences at Taranto (mainly the anti-torpedo nets) were brought up to an adequate standard to protect them from further attacks of the same kind (which happened between March and May 1941). Repairs to Littorio took about four months, to Duilio seven months; Conte di Cavour required extensive salvage work and her repairs were incomplete when Italy surrendered in 1943.

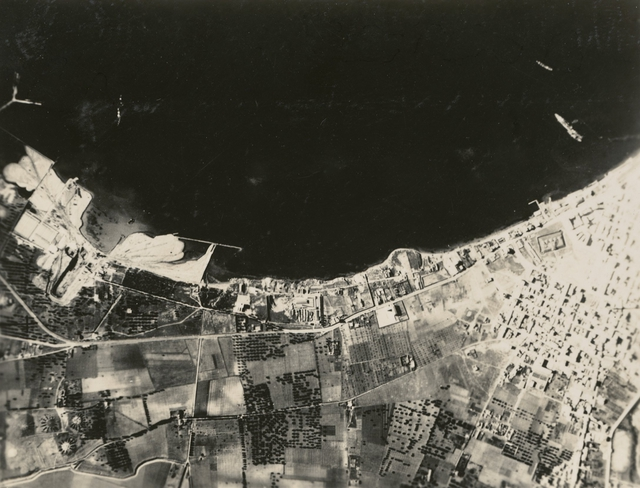
Aftermath of the battle showing an Italian battleship down by the bows and beached (far right)

Littorio was repaired and was operational again within four months, while restoration of the older battleships proceeded at a much slower pace (repairs took seven months for Duilio and the repairs for Conte di Cavour were never completed). The attack was made with twenty Swordfish. Two Italian aircraft were destroyed on the ground by the bombing and two unexploded bombs hit the cruiser Trento and the destroyer Libeccio; near misses damaged the destroyer Pessagno.

The balance of power had swung to the Mediterranean Fleet which now enjoyed more operational freedom: when previously forced to operate as one unit to match Italian capital ships, they could now split into two battlegroups; each of one aircraft carrier and two battleships. Cunningham wrote after the attack: "The Taranto show has freed up our hands considerably & I hope now to shake these damned Eyeties up a bit. I don't think their remaining three battleships will face us and if they do I'm quite prepared to take them on with only two."

Cunningham's estimate that Italians would be unwilling to risk their remaining heavy units was quickly proved wrong. Five days after Taranto, Campioni sortied with two battleships, six cruisers and 14 destroyers to disrupt Operation White a mission to deliver aircraft to Malta. This operation led to the Battle of Cape Spartivento on 27 November 1940, which was indecisive, although the convoy the British warships were escorting did reach Malta. Without the attack on Taranto, the Italians could potentially have had three more battleships at this action. Two of the three damaged battleships were repaired by mid-1941, although the third never returned to active service. Control of the Mediterranean continued to swing back and forth for the next two years.

Damaged Littorio

Recognition of the aircrews at the time were awards of the DSO to Williamson and Hale with their observers receiving the DSC along with DSC for Patch and his observer Goodwin. Lyster was made CB in the New Years Honours list with CBE for the captains of Illustrious and Eagle. Further DSO, DSCs and mentions in dispatches were made about six months later.

Measured against the objective of disrupting Axis convoys to Africa, the Taranto attack had very little effect. Italian shipping to Libya increased between October 1940 and January 1941 to an average of 49,435 long tons (50,228 t) per month, up from the 37,204 long tons (37,801 t) average of the previous four months. Caravaggio argued that, while a tactical success for the British, the Battle of Taranto was a missed opportunity, as the Royal Navy "failed to deliver the true knockout blow that would have changed the context within which the rest of the war in the Mediterranean was fought".

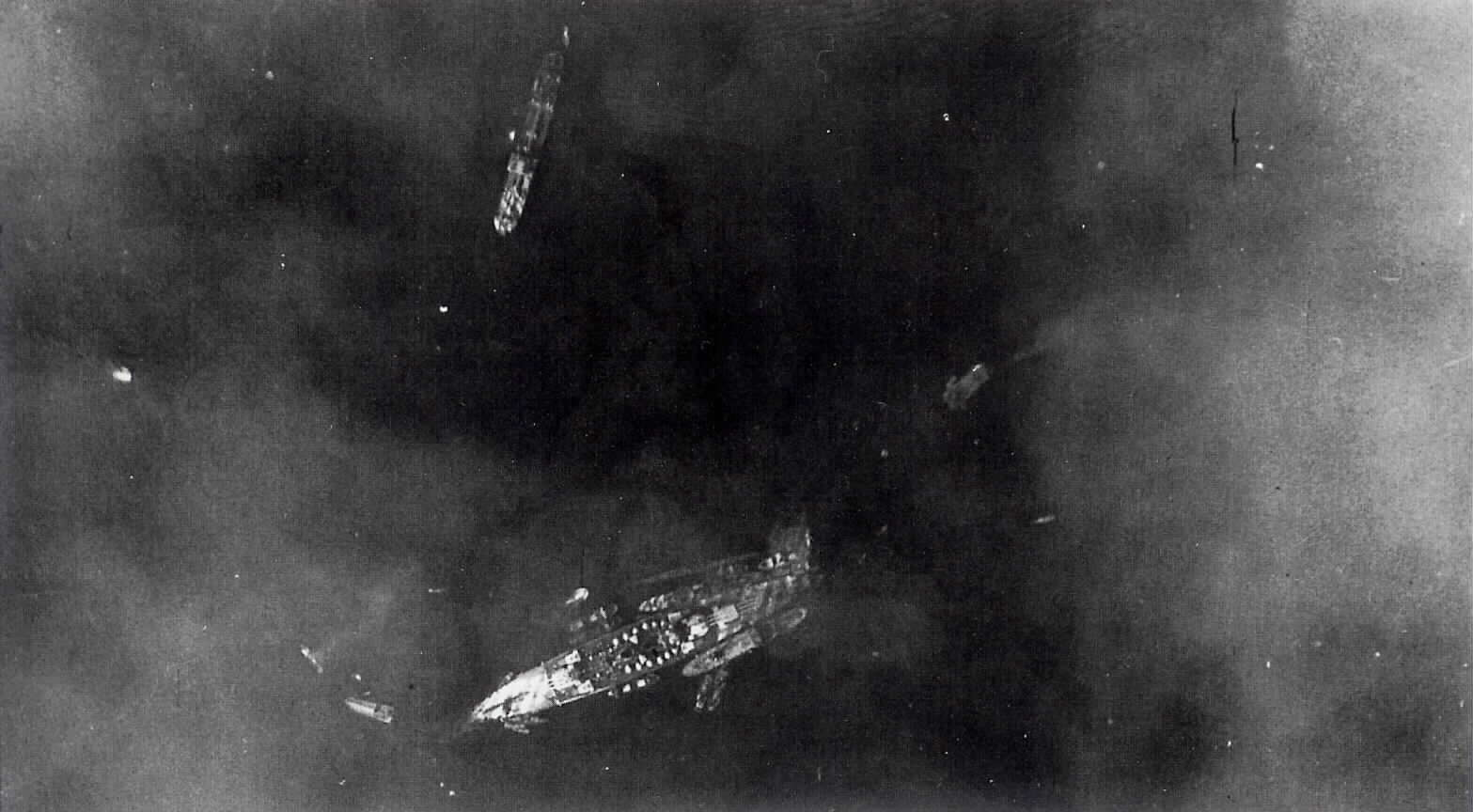
Littorio surrounded by salvage tugs

The Battle of Taranto was one of three events in November and December 1940 that were serious blows to the alliance between Italy and Germany. The attack on Taranto was followed by Operation Compass in Egypt that commenced on 9 December and the Greek counter-offensive in the Greco-Italian War, which began on 14 November 1940. The three Allied victories were embarrassing defeats for the Italians, causing raised eyebrows in the Third Reich. According to Gooch, "Taranto convinced the German navy that any possibility the Italians might achieve mastery of the Mediterranean had disappeared and with it any chance of a successful Italian offensive in Egypt". The view now in Berlin was that success in the Mediterranean, Balkans and North Africa required substantial German involvement, with Italy as the subordinate partner. Attitudes towards their Italian allies hardened in the Reich and the historian, Christian Goeschel, wrote "...German military and political officials now adopted an officious tone in their dealings with Italians, which Badoglio was made to feel in his meeting with Keitel in Innsbruck on 14 and 15 November 1940, the first wartime meeting of the chief of the Wehrmacht's Supreme Command and his Italian counterpart..."

After these defeats for Italy in late 1940, the Italian military attaché in Berlin, General Luigi Efisio Marras, was no longer given the special treatment afforded to the representative of an ally. Henceforth, the alliance between Italy and Nazi Germany never saw the same level of co-operation, trust and mutual respect that occurred between the USA and Britain in World War Two.

As a consequence of the raid on Taranto, many harbours that had until then been considered too shallow for air-dropped torpedoes were now vulnerable. Most navies had thought torpedo attacks against ships must be in water at least 75 ft (23 m) deep.

=== Influence on Pearl Harbor ===
The Imperial Japanese Navy staff studied the Taranto raid during planning for the attack on Pearl Harbor, as it was also a shallow harbour. Lieutenant Commander Takeshi Naito, the assistant naval attaché to Berlin, flew to Taranto to investigate the attack. Naito subsequently had a lengthy conversation with Commander Mitsuo Fuchida about his observations in October 1941. (Note: Fuchida would lead the Japanese attack on 7 December 1941) A group of IJN officers visited Taranto in May 1941 and had lengthy discussions with their Italian Navy counterparts. The Japanese had been working on shallow-water torpedo bombing since early 1939, with shallow ports as the notional targets, including Manila in the Philippines, Singapore, Vladivostok, and Pearl Harbor. In the early 1930s, as their Type 91 aerial torpedo entered service, the Japanese used a breakaway wooden nose to soften its impact with the water. As early as 1936, they perfected breakaway wooden fins for added aerial stability.

The Japanese attack on Pearl Harbor was a considerably larger operation than Taranto. All six Imperial Japanese Navy fleet carriers, each one with an air wing having over twice the number of aircraft of any British carrier, took part; seven American battleships were sunk or disabled, and several other warships were destroyed or damaged. The US Navy designed its fleet operations in the Pacific War around its carriers instead of its battleships as capital ships. Battleships were found to be less useful in the expanses of the Pacific than in the confines of the Mediterranean; the older ships were too slow to escort the carriers and were chiefly used as fire support for amphibious operations.

== Fleet Air Arm order of battle ==
Squadrons
Sqn	Type	No.	Notes
HMS Illustrious
806 Naval Air Squadron	Fulmar	15	
815 Naval Air Squadron	Swordfish	9	
819 Naval Air Squadron	Swordfish	9	
From HMS Eagle
813 Naval Air Squadron	Swordfish	15	Embarked on HMS Illustrious
813 Naval Air Squadron	Sea Gladiator	2	Embarked on HMS Illustrious
824 Naval Air Squadron	Swordfish	2	Embarked on HMS Illustrious

== See also ==
- Bombardment of Copenhagen
- Battle of Port Arthur
- Samsun–Odessa naval sortie raid
