= Littorio-class battleship =

Fast battleship class of the Italian Royal Navy

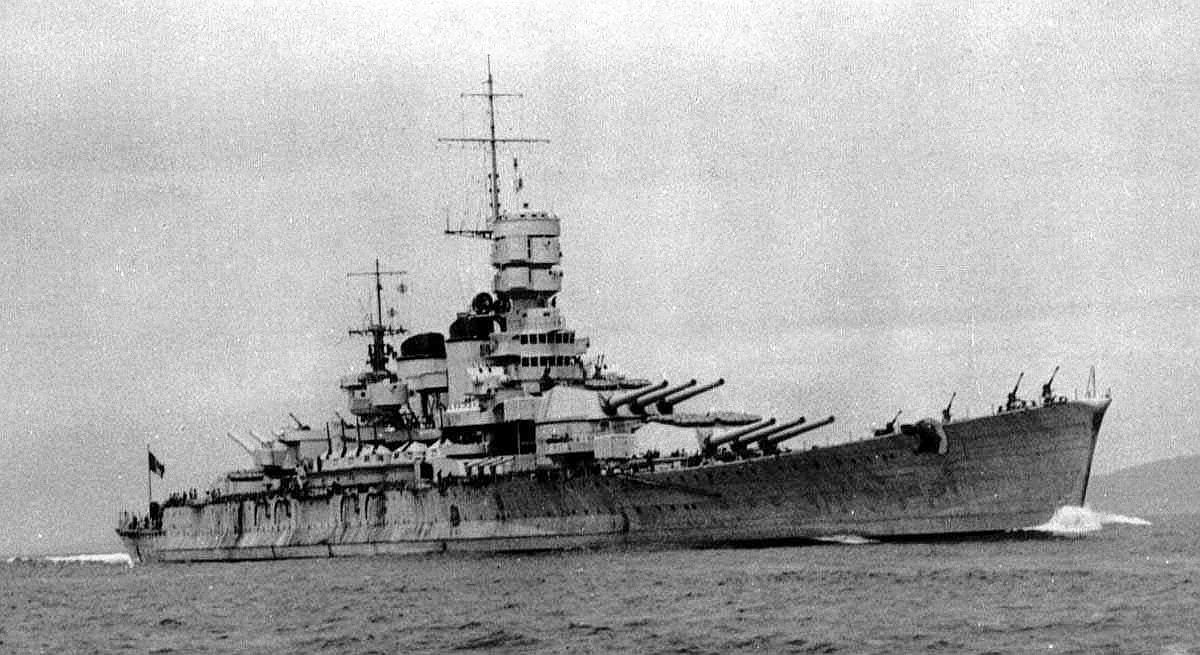
- Roma

Class overview
- Name: Littorio class
- Builders: Cantieri Riuniti dell'Adriatico; Gio. Ansaldo & C.
- Operators: Regia Marina
- Preceded by: Francesco Caracciolo class (planned); Andrea Doria class (actual)
- Succeeded by: None
- Built: 1934–1942
- In service: 1940–1948
- Planned: 4
- Completed: 3
- Cancelled: 1
- Lost: 1

General characteristics for Littorio, as built
- Type: Fast battleship
- Displacement: Standard: 40,724 t (40,081 long tons; 44,891 short tons); Full load: 45,236 t (44,522 long tons; 49,864 short tons)
- Length: 237.76 m (780 ft 1 in)
- Beam: 32.82 m (107 ft 8 in)
- Draft: 9.6 m (31 ft 6 in)
- Installed power: 8 × Yarrow boilers; 128,200 shp (95,600 kW)
- Propulsion: 4 × steam turbines; 4 × screw propellers
- Speed: 30 knots (56 km/h; 35 mph)
- Range: 4,580 nautical miles (8,480 km) at 16 knots (30 km/h; 18 mph)
- Crew: 80 officers; 1,750 enlisted
- Armament: 9 × 381 mm (15 in) guns; 12 × 152 mm (6 in) guns; 4 × 120 mm (4.7 in)/40 guns; 12 × 90 mm (3.5 in) anti-aircraft guns; 20 × 37 mm (1.5 in) guns; 20 × 20 mm (0.79 in) guns
- Armor: Belt: 280 mm (11 in) + 70 mm (3 in); Deck: 90–150 mm (3.5–5.9 in); Bulkheads: 70–280 mm (2.8–11.0 in); Barbettes: 350 mm (14 in); Turrets: 380 mm (15 in); Conning tower: 255 mm (10.0 in)
- Aircraft carried: 3
- Aviation facilities: 1 catapult

The Littorio class, also known as the Vittorio Veneto class, (Note: Vittorio Veneto and Littorio were laid down on the same date, so ambiguity exists in the naming of the class.) was a class of battleship of the Regia Marina, the Italian navy. The class was composed of four ships—Littorio, Vittorio Veneto, Roma, and Impero—but only the first three ships of the class were completed. Built between 1934 and 1942, they were the most modern battleships used by Italy during World War II. They were developed in response to the French Dunkerque-class battleships, and were armed with 381-millimeter (15 in) guns and had a top speed of 30 knots (56 km/h; 35 mph). The class's design was considered by the Spanish Navy, but the outbreak of World War II interrupted construction plans.

The first two ships, Littorio and Vittorio Veneto, were operational by the early months of Italy's participation in World War II. They formed the backbone of the Italian fleet, and conducted several sorties into the Mediterranean to intercept British convoys, though without any notable success. The two ships were repeatedly torpedoed throughout their careers: Littorio was hit by a torpedo during the attack on Taranto in November 1940 and again in June 1942; Vittorio Veneto was torpedoed during the Battle of Cape Matapan in March 1941 and while escorting a convoy to North Africa in September 1941. Roma joined the fleet in June 1942, although all three ships remained inactive in La Spezia until June 1943, when all three were damaged in a series of Allied air attacks on the harbor.

In September 1943, Italy capitulated and signed an Armistice with the Allies. Littorio was then renamed Italia. The three active battleships were transferred to Malta before they were to be interned in Alexandria. While en route to Malta, German bombers attacked the fleet with Fritz X radio-guided bombs, damaging Italia and sinking Roma. Nevertheless, Italia and Vittorio Veneto reached Malta and were interned. The incomplete Impero was seized by the Germans after Italy withdrew from the war and used as a target, until she was sunk by American bombers in 1945. Italia and Vittorio Veneto were awarded to the United States and Britain, respectively, as war prizes. Italia, Vittorio Veneto, and Impero were broken up for scrap between 1952 and 1954.

== Design ==
The Washington Naval Treaty of 1922 allotted Italy an additional 70,000 long tons (71,000 t) of total capital ship tonnage, which could be used in 1927–1929, while other powers were observing the "holiday" in battleship construction prescribed by the treaty. France, which was given parity with Italy, also possessed 70,000 tons of capital ship tonnage. Both countries were put under significant pressure from the other signatories to use their allotted tonnage to build smaller battleships with reduced caliber main batteries. The first Italian design, prepared in 1928, called for a 23,000-long-ton (23,370 t) ship armed with a main battery of six 381 mm (15 in) guns in twin turrets. They opted for this design because this allowed three ships under the 70,000-ton limit. This would have allowed the Italian fleet to keep at least two units operational at any given time. Protection and radius of action were sacrificed for speed and heavy armament, though the Italians did not value range, as they operated primarily in the confined waters of the Mediterranean.

Later in 1928, the design staff prepared another ship, with a displacement of 35,000 long tons (36,000 t), armed with six 406 mm (16 in) guns and protected against guns of the same caliber. At least one of these ships would have followed the three 23,000-ton ships once the building holiday expired in 1931. Funding was not allocated to begin construction, however, as the Italian Navy did not want to instigate an arms race with the French Navy. The London Naval Treaty of 1930 extended the building holiday to 1936, though Italy and France retained the right to build 70,000 tons of new capital ships. Both countries rejected British proposals to limit new battleship designs to 25,000 long tons (25,400 t) and 305 mm (12 in) guns. After 1930, the Italian Navy abandoned the smaller designs altogether. By 1930, Germany had begun to build the three Deutschland-class ships, armed with six 280 mm (11 in) guns, and France had in turn laid down two Dunkerque-class battleships to counter them. The French vessels were armed with eight 330 mm (13 in) guns. In late 1932, Italian constructors responded with a design similar to the Deutschland class, but armed with six 343 mm (13.5 in) guns in triple turrets on a 18,000-long-ton (18,290 t) displacement.

The Italian Navy decided that the smaller design was impractical, and that a larger design should be pursued. A 26,500 long tons (26,900 t) design was then prepared, which mounted eight 343 mm guns in twin turrets. This was ultimately abandoned in favor of a 35,000 ton design to be armed with 406 mm guns. The 406 mm gun in turn was abandoned in favor of the 381 mm gun because there were no designs for the larger gun, which would delay construction; a 381 mm gun had already been designed for the canceled Francesco Caracciolo class. Ultimately, nine 381 mm guns in three triple turrets were adopted as the primary battery for the ships, on a displacement in excess of 40,000 long tons (41,000 t), despite the fact that this violated the established naval treaties. Nevertheless, by the time these ships entered service, the international arms control system had fallen apart and the major naval powers had invoked the "escalator clause" that allowed for ships up to 45,000-long-ton (46,000 t) displacement.

=== General characteristics ===
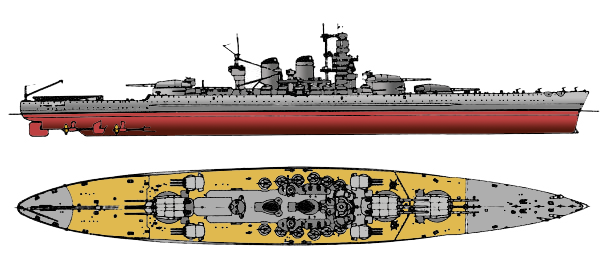
Line-drawing of the Littorio class

The ships of the class varied slightly in dimensions. Littorio and Vittorio Veneto were 224.05 meters (735 ft 1 in) long between perpendiculars and 237.76 m (780 ft 1 in) long overall, while Roma and Impero were 240.68 m (789 ft 8 in) long overall. All four ships had a draft of 9.6 m (31 ft 6 in) and a beam of 32.82 m (107 ft 8 in). Littorio displaced 40,724 metric tons (40,081 long tons; 44,891 short tons) as designed and 45,236 t (44,522 long tons; 49,864 short tons) at full load. Vittorio Veneto displaced 40,517 t (39,877 long tons; 44,662 short tons) and 45,029 t (44,318 long tons; 49,636 short tons), respectively. Roma's displacement increased slightly as compared to the other ships, to 40,992 t (40,345 long tons; 45,186 short tons) and 45,485 t (44,767 long tons; 50,139 short tons), respectively. As Impero was not completed, her final displacement is unknown. As built, the ships were fitted with bulbous bows to increase their speed, but they were found to cause serious vibration, which forced a modification to the bow.

Littorio and Vittorio Veneto had a standard crew of 80 officers and 1,750 enlisted men; while serving as a flagship, the crew was increased by a command staff of between 11 and 31 additional officers. The standard crew for Roma and Impero was increased by 100 enlisted men. Aircraft facilities were located on the quarterdeck, where it was initially planned to base six La Cierva autogyros. Instead, a single catapult was fitted. The ships were equipped with three Ro.43 reconnaissance seaplanes or navalized Re.2000 fighters. The Re.2000 fighter was a wheeled aircraft and had to land on an airfield.

The ships' propulsion system consisted of four Belluzzo geared steam turbines powered by eight oil-fired Yarrow boilers. The engines were rated at 128,200 shaft horsepower (95,600 kW) and a top speed of 30 knots (56 km/h; 35 mph). On sea trials, both Littorio and Vittorio Veneto exceeded the design specifications for their power plant. Littorio reached 137,649 shp (102,645 kW) and 31.3 kn (58.0 km/h; 36.0 mph), while Vittorio Veneto made 133,771 shp (99,753 kW) and 31.4 kn (58.2 km/h; 36.1 mph), both at light loadings. In service, however, the ships averaged 28 kn (52 km/h; 32 mph). Figures for Roma's speed trials have not been recorded. The ships carried 4,140 t (4,070 long tons; 4,560 short tons) of fuel oil, which enabled a maximum range of 4,580 nautical miles (8,480 km; 5,270 mi) at a cruising speed of 16 kn (30 km/h; 18 mph). At 14 kn (26 km/h; 16 mph), the ships' range increased slightly to 4,700 nmi (8,700 km; 5,400 mi). The entire machinery system accounted for about 5.6 percent of the total displacement.

=== Armament ===
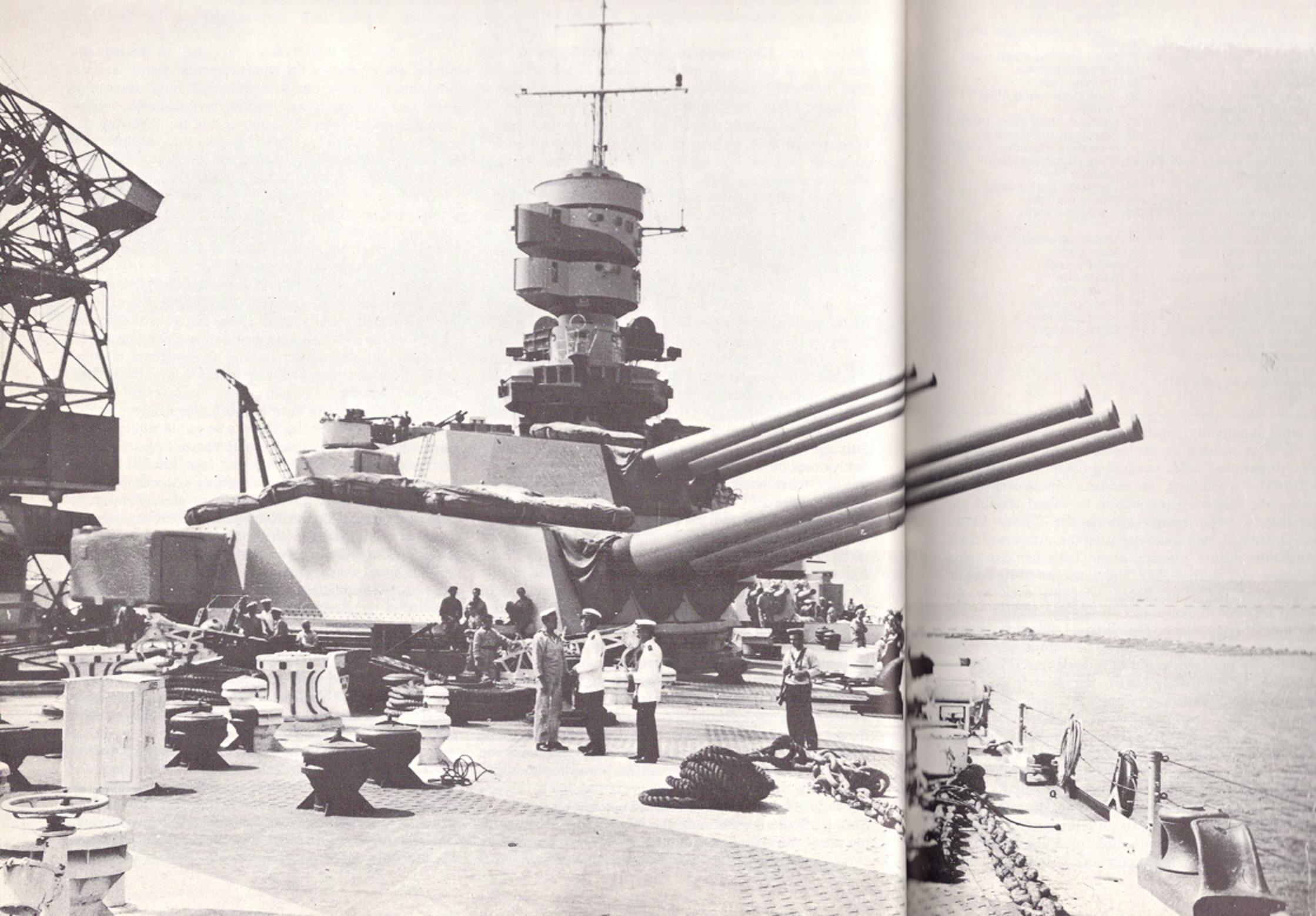
Roma's forward triple 15-inch (381 mm) 50-caliber gun turrets.

The ships' main battery consisted of nine 381 mm L/50 Ansaldo 1934 guns in three triple turrets, two in a superfiring pair forward and one aft. These long-barrel, high-velocity guns were chosen to compensate for the smaller 381 mm shell as compared to the 406 mm gun originally desired. The 381 mm guns had a maximum elevation of 35 degrees, which allowed them to engage targets out to 42,260 m (46,220 yd). The guns fired a 885 kg (1,951 lb) armor-piercing (AP) shell at a muzzle velocity of 870 meters per second (2,854 ft/s). However, this was reduced to 850 m/s (2,789 ft/s) in order to reduce dispersion and increase barrel service life. The 824.3 kg (1,817 lb) semi-armor piercing shells formed the secondary ammunition of the 381mm/50, which had a 29.51 kg (65.1 lb) bursting charge. Although high explosive shells weighing 774 kg (1,706 lb) were developed for the 381 mm guns, they never saw service on the Littorio-class. Shell rooms were located below the propellant magazines beneath the gun house in the turret structure. The guns' rate of fire was one shot every 45 seconds. (Note: This corresponded to 1.33 rounds per minute. In comparison, the French 380 mm gun mounted on the Richelieu class could fire every 25–40 seconds, a rate of fire of between 2.4 and 1.5 rounds per minute. The German 380 mm gun mounted on the Bismarck class, could fire every 26 seconds, a rate of fire of 2.3 rounds per minute. The British 15-inch gun, of World War I-vintage, could fire every 30 seconds, or 2 rounds per minute.) Their ammunition load was 495 AP shells and 171 SAP shells, with 4,320 propellant charges (666 rounds total, or 74 rounds per gun split 55 AP & 19 SAP).

The ships' secondary battery consisted of twelve 152 mm (6 in) L/55 Ansaldo Model 1934 guns in four triple turrets. Two were placed abreast the No. 2 main battery turret and two on either side of the rear turret. These guns fired a 50 kg (110 lb) AP shell at a muzzle velocity of 910 m/s (2,986 ft/s). They could elevate to 45 degrees, permitting a maximum range of 25,740 m (28,150 yd). They had a rate of fire of slightly better than four rounds a minute. Four 120 mm (4.7 in) L/40 guns were mounted on each ship in order to fire illumination rounds. Able to elevate to 32 degrees, they fired a 29.3 kg (65 lb) semi-fixed round out to an effective range of 5,000 m (16,400 ft).

The ships' anti-aircraft armament was composed of a powerful battery of twelve 90 mm (3.5 in) L/50 guns closely arranged amidships, twenty 37 mm (1.5 in) L/54 guns, and sixteen 20 mm (0.79 in) L/65 guns. The 90 mm guns provided long-range anti-aircraft protection, and were mounted in quadriaxially stabilized single turrets. They had a rate of fire of 12 rounds per minute and had a ceiling of approximately 10,800 m (35,400 ft). The 37 mm and 20 mm guns were designed for close-range defense and had effective ranges of 4,000 m (13,100 ft) and 2,500 m (8,200 ft), respectively.

=== Armor ===
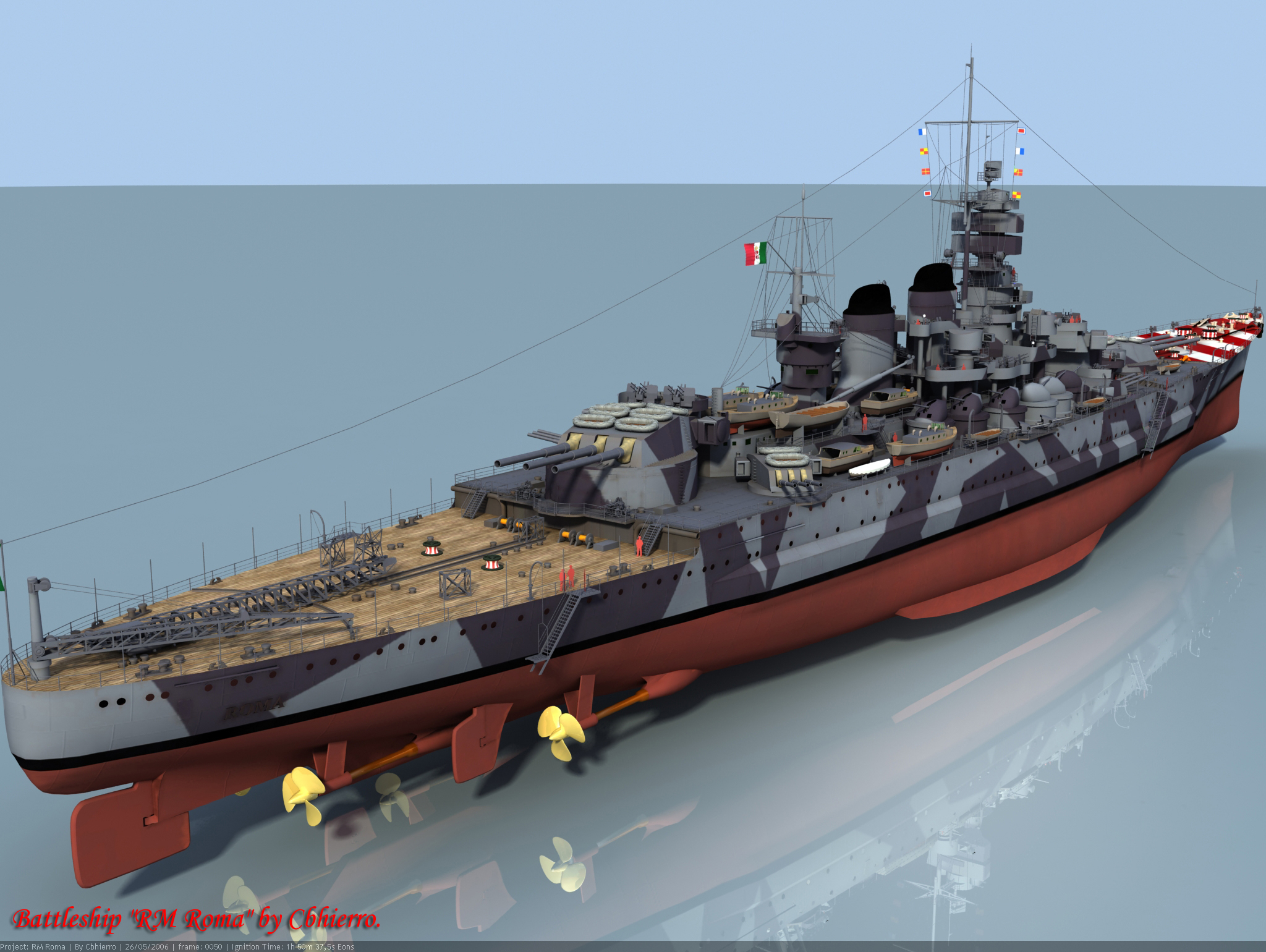
Note the extent of the armored belt at the waterline, amidships

The main belt armor of this class was designed and tested to resist 381 mm armor-piercing shells at ranges down to 16,000 m (17,000 yd), which was considered the inner edge of optimal combat range. The belt consists of a 70 mm (2.8 in) homogeneous armor outer plate and the 280 mm (11 in) cemented armor belt placed 250 mm (9.8 in) behind the outer plate; the 250 mm gap was filed with a cement foam called "Cellulite" to keep the water out of the gap and assist in de-capping armor piercing shells. (Note: The 250 mm "Cellulite" accomplished the same task as a 600mm void.) The main armor belt was mounted on 150 mm (5.9 in) of oak timber and 15 mm (0.59 in) steel backing plate, and the entire belt structure was inclined at 11-15º, depending on the section of the hull. A 36 mm (1.4 in) homogeneous armor plate was placed 1.4 m (4.6 ft) behind the belt, followed 4 m (13 ft) behind by another 24 mm (0.94 in) plate sloped 26º in the opposite direction. The main citadel was closed off by 100–210 mm (3.9–8.3 in) forward and 70–280 mm (2.8–11.0 in) aft traverse bulkheads. The hull space above the citadel was an armored casemate with 70 mm (2.8 in) plating. The bow was protected by a 130 mm (5.1 in) belt that extends 35 m (115 ft) ahead of the main belt before terminating in a 60 mm (2.4 in) transverse bulkhead. The propeller shafts, aft diesel generator groups, and steering gear were protected by 100 mm (3.9 in) homogeneous armor plating and a separate 200 mm (7.9 in) bulkhead aft of the citadel.

The weather deck over the citadel consists of 36 mm (1.4 in) homogeneous armor over 9 mm (0.35 in) plating; the main armor deck varied depending on the space it was protecting. Over the magazines, the main armor deck was 150 mm (5.9 in) homogeneous armor laminated on a 12 mm (0.47 in) deck plating inboard and 100 mm (3.9 in) on 12 mm plating outboard. Over the machinery spaces, the main armor deck was 100 mm (3.9 in) on 12 mm plating inboard and 90 mm (3.5 in) on 12 mm plating outboard. The main armor deck extends to the bow and stern, where it thinned to 60 mm (2.4 in) over 10 mm (0.39 in) plating and 36 mm (1.4 in) over 8 mm (0.31 in) plating respectively.

The main battery turrets were protected by 380 mm (15 in) cemented armor faces, 200 mm (7.9 in) forward sides and roof, 130 mm (5.1 in) rear sides, 150 mm (5.9 in) rear roof, and 350 mm (14 in) rear. The barbettes were 350 mm (14 in) above the upper deck and 280 mm (11 in) below deck. The 152-mm secondary battery turrets were protected by 280 mm (11 in) faces, 80–130 mm (3.1–5.1 in) sides, 80 mm (3.1 in) rear, and 105–150 mm (4.1–5.9 in) roof, while their barbettes were 150 mm (5.9 in) above deck and 100 mm (3.9 in) below deck. Below the third deck, neither the primary nor secondary barbettes were protected by armor. The 90-mm heavy anti-aircraft mounts were protected by 12–40 mm (0.47–1.57 in) shield and barbette plating.

The conning tower was in the same style as the others designed by General Pugliese. The uppermost level was protected by 255 mm (10 in) on the front and sides and 175 mm (6.9 in) rear, all mounted on 25 mm (0.98 in) plating. The lower two levels had 250 mm (9.8 in) and 200 mm (7.9 in) respectively, all mounted on 10 mm (0.39 in) plating. The roof 90–120 mm (3.5–4.7 in) on 10-mm plating. An internal 200 mm (7.9 in) armored tube protected important electrical cables and pipes for hydraulic systems.

==== Pugliese torpedo defense system ====
Cross-section of the Littorio class showing the details of the Pugliese system

All four ships incorporated a unique underwater protection system named after its designer, Umberto Pugliese. A 40 mm thick torpedo bulkhead extended inboard from the base of the main belt before curving down to meet the bottom of the hull. This formed a void which housed an empty drum 3,800 mm (150 in) wide with 6 mm (0.24 in) thick walls; the rest of the void was filled with liquid. The drum ran the length of the torpedo defense system, and was designed to collapse to contain the explosive pressure of a torpedo hit. The torpedo bulkhead would prevent any splinters or explosive effects from entering the ships' vitals. The system was designed to protect the ship from torpedo warheads up to 350 kg (770 lb).

The system did not perform as effectively as expected. This was due to two serious defects in the design. The riveted joint that connected the interior torpedo bulkhead to the bottom of the hull was not strong enough to sustain the tremendous shear loadings associated with direct contact explosions. The joints failed even in cases of non-contact explosions, which prevented the hollow drum from collapsing as designed and resulted in massive flooding. The fineness of the hull shape prevented the 3,800 mm (150 in) thickness from being maintained for the entire central citadel; the width of the drum was reduced significantly abreast of the main battery, down to 2,280 mm (90 in). The ability of the drum to absorb explosive shock correspondingly fell in relation to its size.

== Construction ==
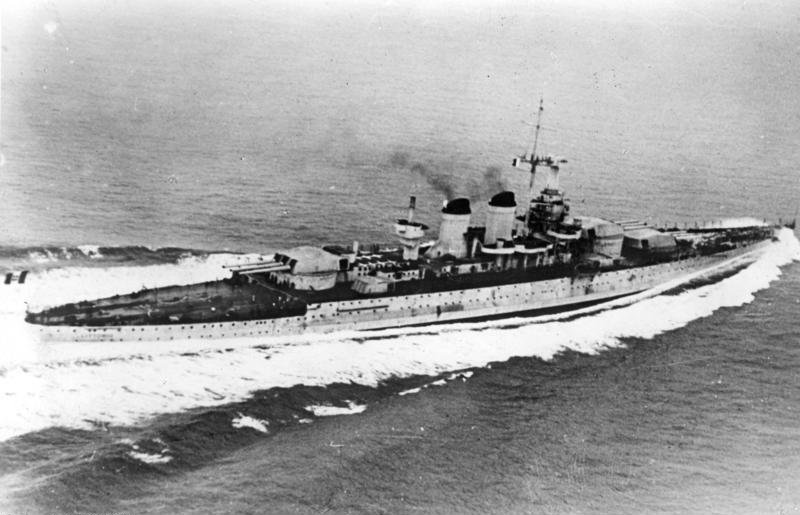
Littorio before completion; note the secondary battery and other equipment have not been installed

The keels for Vittorio Veneto and Littorio were laid on the same day, 28 October 1934, at the Cantieri Riuniti dell'Adriatico shipyard in Trieste and the Ansaldo shipyard in Genoa, respectively. Vittorio Veneto was launched on 22 July 1937, with Littorio following exactly one month later on 22 August. While incomplete, Vittorio Veneto went to sea on 23 October 1939 to conduct machinery trials. She was delivered to the Italian Navy in Trieste, still incomplete, some six months later on 28 April 1940. She departed Trieste on 1 May for final fitting out at the dockyard in La Spezia. After completion on 15 May 1940, she went to Taranto to join the fleet. Littorio underwent the same pattern of machinery trials prior to completion; she was delivered to the fleet on 6 May 1940.

Two additional ships were laid down four years later. Roma was built by the CRDA shipyard, starting on 18 September 1938. She was launched on 9 June 1940 and was completed on 14 June 1942, after which she joined the fleet in La Spezia and replaced Littorio as the fleet flagship. Impero was laid down at the Ansaldo shipyard on 14 May 1938. She was launched on 15 November 1939, but she was never completed. After the entrance of Italy to World War II, the Italian Navy moved the unfinished ship from Genoa to Brindisi, out of fears of French attacks on the vessel. Work was not resumed.

== Ships ==
Construction data
Ship	Namesake	Builder	Laid down	Launched	Completed	Fate
Littorio	The Lictor, an Italian Fascist emblem	Ansaldo, Genoa-Sestri Ponente	28 October 1934	22 August 1937	6 May 1940	Scrapped at La Spezia, 1952–1954
Vittorio Veneto	Battle of Vittorio Veneto	Cantieri Riuniti dell'Adriatico, Trieste	28 October 1934	25 July 1937	15 May 1940	Scrapped at La Spezia, 1951–1954
Roma	City of Rome	Cantieri Riuniti dell'Adriatico, Trieste	18 September 1938	9 June 1940	14 June 1942	Sunk, by glide bomb, 9 September 1943
Impero	The Italian Empire in East Africa	Ansaldo, Genoa-Sestri Ponente	14 May 1938	15 November 1939	—N/a	Scrapped in Venice, 1948–1950

== Service history ==
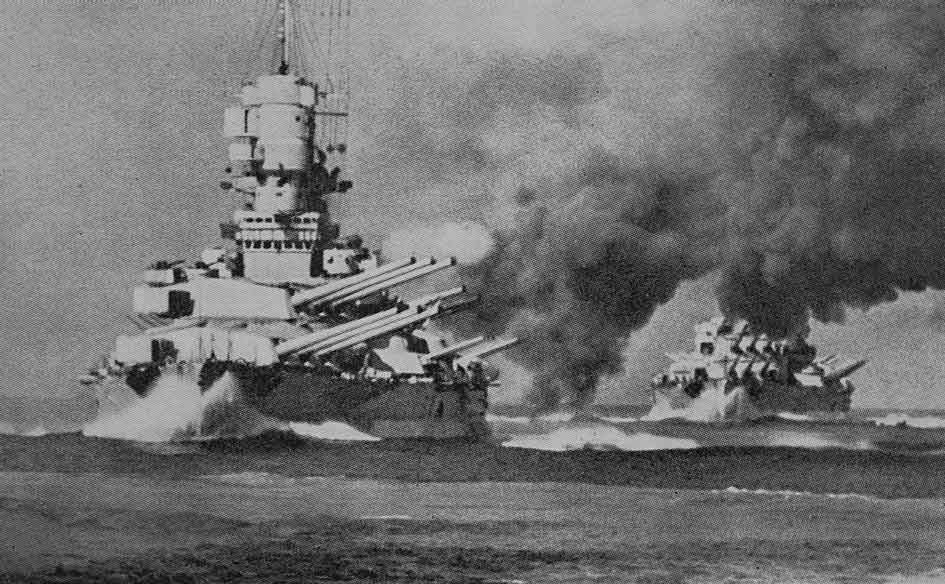
Vittorio Veneto and Littorio

Littorio and Vittorio Veneto were declared operational on 2 August 1940, and were assigned to the 9th Division of the 1st Squadron. On 31 August, the two ships, along with three of the older battleships steamed with a force of ten cruisers and thirty-one destroyers to engage the Operation Hats convoy, but poor reconnaissance prevented the Italian force from engaging the British ships. The ships made another unsuccessful sortie to attack another Malta convoy on 29 September. During the attack on Taranto on 12 November 1940, Littorio was hit twice by torpedoes, suffering serious damage. Significant flooding caused the ship to settle by the bow. The ship was dry-docked on 11 December, with repairs completed by 11 March 1941. Vittorio Veneto, however, emerged from the attack undamaged. While her sister was being repaired, she took over flagship duties and was transferred to Naples.

Vittorio Veneto sortied on 26 November and encountered British forces south of Sardinia. During the resulting Battle of Cape Spartivento, Swordfish torpedo bombers from the carrier HMS Ark Royal attacked Vittorio Veneto, though she evaded the torpedoes. She briefly engaged British cruisers with her rear main battery turret, without scoring any hits. During the engagement, one of her Ro.43 reconnaissance planes was shot down by a Skua fighter. On the night of 8–9 January 1941, the Royal Air Force attacked Naples with heavy bombers, but failed to hit the ship. In February, Vittorio Veneto, Andrea Doria and Giulio Cesare attempted to attack what was believed to be a Malta convoy. The British squadron was in fact Force H, steaming to bombard Genoa. The two fleets did not make contact, however, and the Italians returned to port.

Vittorio Veneto, low in the water after being torpedoed in the Battle of Cape Matapan

On 26 March 1941, Vittorio Veneto departed port to attack British convoys to Greece. Germany pressured the Italian Navy to begin the operation, under the impression that they had disabled two of the three battleships assigned to the British Mediterranean Fleet. (Note: Two German He 111 torpedo bombers attacked the Mediterranean Fleet off Crete, reporting two hits on two large units, estimated to be battleships.) This resulted in the Battle of Cape Matapan the following day, during which Vittorio Veneto engaged British cruisers. She was then attacked by torpedo bombers from HMS Formidable; the first wave failed, but the second scored a single hit each on both Vittorio Veneto and the heavy cruiser Pola. Vittorio Veneto shot down one aircraft, but the battleship was flooded with some 4,000 t (3,900 long tons; 4,400 short tons) of water, though she got underway after ten minutes and eventually reached Taranto on 29 March. Repairs lasted until July.

Littorio and Vittorio Veneto had both returned to active duty by August 1941, and on the 22nd the two ships sortied to attack a convoy. They returned to port without encountering any British forces, however. On 26 September, the two battleships attempted to intercept the Operation Halberd convoy, but they broke off the operation without attacking the convoy. While escorting a convoy to North Africa, Vittorio Veneto was torpedoed by the British submarine HMS Urge; repairs lasted until Spring, 1942. Shortly thereafter, on 13 December, Littorio escorted another convoy to North Africa. This operation resulted in the First Battle of Sirte, which ended inconclusively. She provided distant cover to another convoy on 3–6 January 1942. On 21 March, Littorio sortied to attack a British convoy, which led to the Second Battle of Sirte. During the engagement, she badly damaged the destroyers Havock and Kingston.

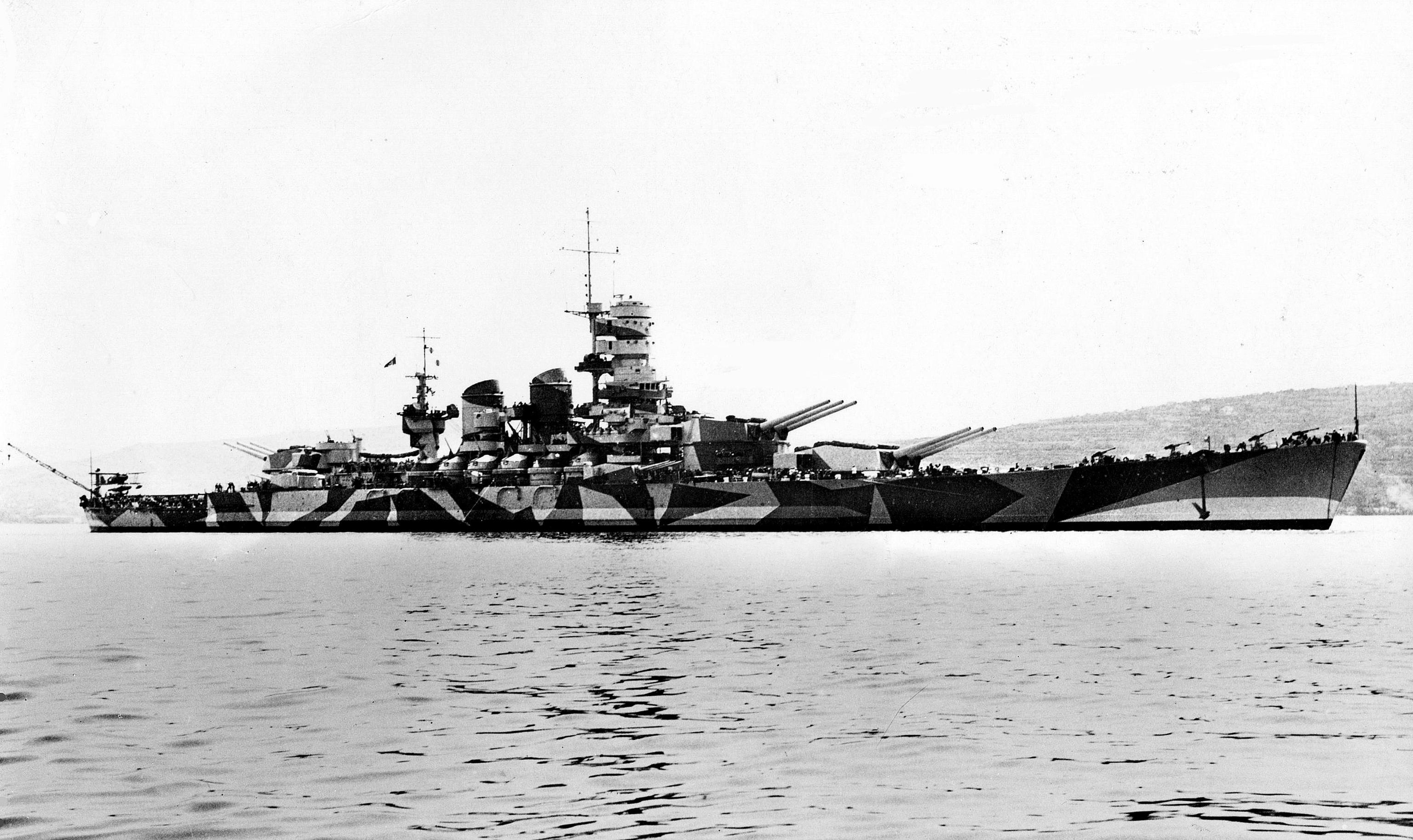
Roma c. 1942–1943

Repairs to Vittorio Veneto were completed in time for her to join Littorio on attacks on the convoys Vigorous and Harpoon, which had departed Alexandria and Gibraltar to reinforce Malta simultaneously in mid-June. Combat was limited to the opposing light forces, and Littorio and Vittorio Veneto did not see action; the British nevertheless broke off Operation Vigorous due to the battleships' presence and heavy air attacks. While returning to port, Littorio was hit by a bomb from an American B-24 Liberator heavy bomber; the bomb struck the forward gun turret, though it did minimal damage. Before returning to port, a British Wellington bomber torpedoed the ship. The torpedo struck her starboard bow, though she returned to port. Repairs were completed and on 12 December, both ships were moved from Taranto to La Spezia in response to the Allied landings in North Africa. Roma joined the fleet shortly after the attacks on the two convoys, and joined her sisters for the move to La Spezia. There, she replaced Littorio as the fleet flagship.

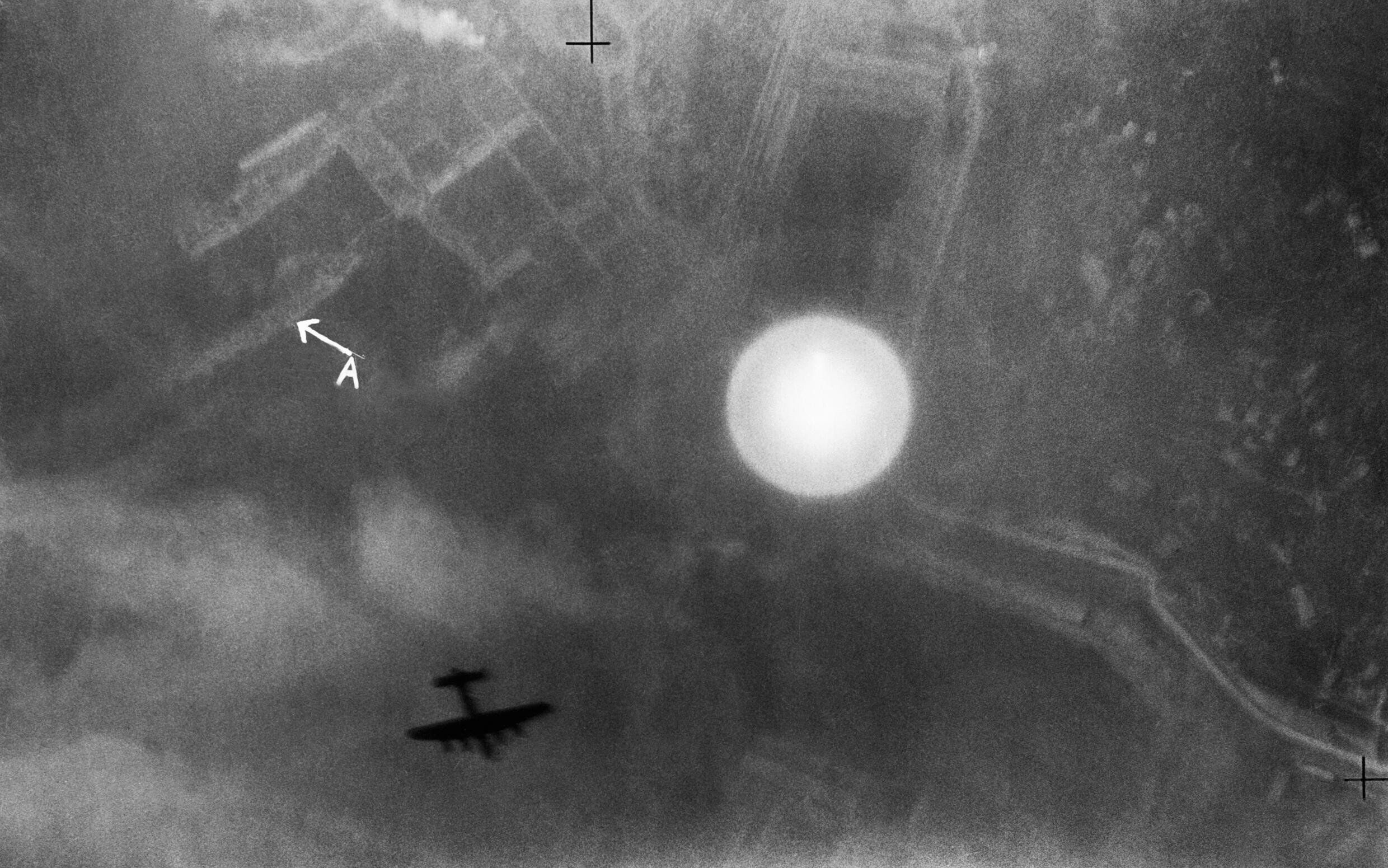
The port of La Spezia lit up by a photoflash bomb during an air-raid on the night of the 13–14 April 1943; 'A' indicates one of the Littorio-class ships at anchor

In June 1943, a series of Allied air raids attacked La Spezia in an attempt to neutralize the three battleships. On 5 June, Vittorio Veneto was hit by two large bombs that struck her port side. She was transferred to Genoa for repairs, which were not completed before the Armistice that ended Italian participation in the war. Littorio was hit by three bombs on 19 June, a week after her sister was damaged. She was renamed Italia after Benito Mussolini's regime collapsed. Roma was damaged during the 5 June attack and again in a third attack on 23 June. In September 1943, following the withdrawal of Italy from the war, all three ships and a significant portion of the Italian fleet left port to be interned in Malta. While en route, German bombers laden with Fritz X radio-guided bombs attacked the formation. One hit Italia in the bow forward the main battery turrets, causing serious damage. Two hit Roma; one passed through the ship and exploded under her keel, and the second hit near the forward magazines. The bomb detonated the magazines, causing a massive explosion that destroyed the ship with heavy casualties.

Italia and Vittorio Veneto reached Malta, where they remained until 14 September, when they were transferred to Alexandria. They remained at the Great Bitter Lake in the Suez Canal for the rest of the war. On 6 June 1946, Vittorio Veneto steamed to Augusta in Sicily, where, under the Treaty of Peace with Italy, she was allocated to Britain. On 14 October 1946, she was moved to La Spezia, paid off on 3 January 1948, and broken up for scrap. Italia left Great Bitter Lake on 5 February 1947, to join her sister in Augusta. Allocated to the United States, she was stricken on 1 June 1948 and scrapped in La Spezia. The incomplete Impero had meanwhile been seized by the retreating Germans in 1943, who used her as a target, until she was sunk by American bombers on 20 February 1945. In October 1947, the ship was raised and towed to Venice, where she was broken up.

== The Littorio design in foreign navies ==
In 1939, Spain's General Francisco Franco briefly considered a naval building program after seizing power in the Spanish Civil War. Franco concluded several agreements with the Italian government that would have seen the building of four Littorio-class battleships in Spain. The Italians promised to provide all necessary technical and material support for the construction of the ships. The Italian Navy pushed to modernize and enlarge the existing shipyards in Spain, so that they could handle a vessel as large as the Littorio class. The project was abandoned after Italy became involved in World War II, and as a result of limited Spanish industrial capacity.

In the early 1930s, the Soviet Navy began a naval construction program, and sought advice from foreign shipbuilders for a new class of battleships. On 14 July 1939, Ansaldo completed a design proposal for the Soviet Navy, for a ship largely based on the Littorio class, designated U.P. 41. The design was for a 42,000 t (41,000 long tons; 46,000 short tons) ship armed with nine 406 mm guns in triple turrets. The Italians did not disclose the specifications of the Pugliese system and instead used a multiple-torpedo-bulkhead system. Regardless, the Soviet Navy did not use the U.P. 41 design as the basis for the Sovetsky Soyuz-class battleships they laid down in the late 1930s. They were, however, equipped with the Pugliese system, the details of which were revealed through Soviet espionage.

In preparing the design for the Design 1047 type of battlecruisers in early 1940, the Dutch Navy inspected Vittorio Veneto, then under construction, in hopes of gathering some experience on the underwater protection system. The Italians refused to disclose the details of the Pugliese system.
