= 152 mm/55 Italian naval gun Models 1934 and 1936 =

152 mm /55 Model 1934-1936
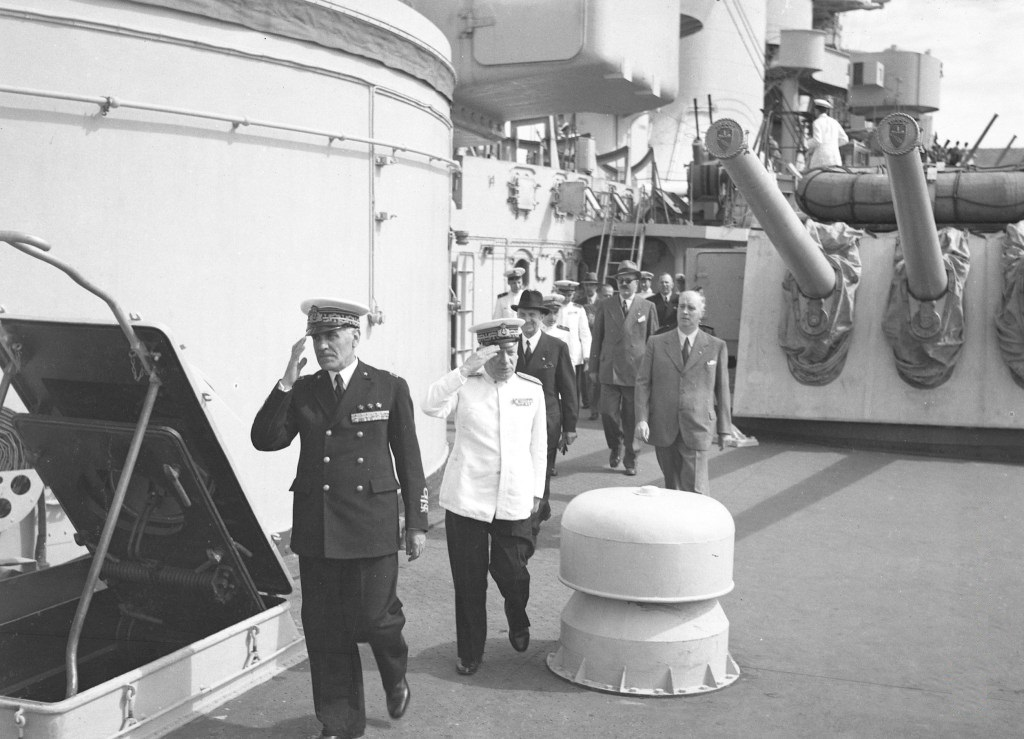
- Admiral Carlo Bergamini on the deck of battleship Roma with a triple-turret in the background.
- Type: Naval gun
- Place of origin: Italy

Service history
- In service: 1934-1953
- Used by: Italy
- Wars: World War II

Production history
- Designer: Ansaldo
- Designed: 1934
- Manufacturer: Ansaldo; OTO Melara
- Produced: 1934-1936

Specifications
- Mass: 8.9 metric tons
- Length: 8.84 meters (29 ft 0 in)
- Barrel length: 8.38 meters (27 ft 6 in) 55 caliber
- Shell weight: 50 kilograms (110 lb)
- Caliber: 152 millimeters (6.0 in)
- Breech: Horizontal sliding breech block
- Elevation: -5° to +45°
- Traverse: -120° to +120°
- Rate of fire: 4-5 rpm
- Muzzle velocity: 910 m/s (3,000 ft/s)
- Maximum firing range: 25.7 kilometres (16.0 mi) at +45°

The 152 mm /55 Model 1934–1936 were built for the Italian Navy in the years before World War II. These guns were used on the Duca degli Abruzzi-class light cruisers, which were the final class of Condottieri series cruisers, as their primary armament and as secondary armament on the Littorio-class battleships. The Model 1934 was designed by Ansaldo, while the Model 1936 was manufactured by OTO Melara.

== Construction ==
The Model 1934 was designed and manufactured by Ansaldo, while the Model 1936 was manufactured by OTO Melara. The Model 1934's made by Ansaldo were of monobloc construction with a horizontal sliding breech block, while the Model 1936's made by OTO Melara were constructed of two tubes, a loose liner and a horizontal sliding breech block. Both models fired the same quick firing separate loading ammunition. The gun mounts had electrically powered training, elevation and hoists. There were telescopic pneumatic rammers and each gun had a separate cradle. Loading was at any angle up to +20° for both the twin and triple mounts. These guns were considered a significant improvement over the earlier 152 mm /53 Models 1926 and 1929 guns in that they had a lower muzzle velocity, were more widely spaced in the turrets and had separate gun cradles. This gun proved to be much more accurate than its predecessors, with tight dispersion patterns at distance using APC shells; substantially larger patterns when using HE shells were not attributed to the gun but to the shell shape, and work was underway in 1941 on a new design to correct this issue.

== Naval Service ==
Ansaldo Model 1934 guns were mounted triple wing turrets on the Littorio, and in triple and twin superfiring turrets forward and aft on the Duca degli Abruzzi-class. OTO Melara Model 1936 guns were mounted in triple wing turrets in the Vittorio Veneto and Roma.

== Ammunition ==
Ammunition was of quick fire separate loading type. The AP projectile was 63 centimetres (2.07 ft) long with a cartridge case and a bagged charge which weighed 16.35 kilograms (36.0 lb).

The gun was able to fire:

- Armor Piercing - 50 kg (110 lb)
- High Explosive - 44.4 kg (98 lb)

== See also ==
=== Weapons of comparable role, performance and era ===
- Canon de 152 mm Modèle 1930: French equivalent
- BL 6 inch Mk XXIII naval gun: British equivalent
- 15 cm SK C/25: German equivalent light cruiser gun
- 15 cm SK C/28: approximate German equivalent
- 15.5 cm/60 3rd Year Type: slightly larger Japanese equivalent
- 6"/47 caliber Mark 16 gun: US equivalent light cruiser gun
