= Italian ship Trieste =

Trieste was the name of at least two ships of the Italian Navy and may refer to:

- Italian cruiser Trieste, a Trento-class cruiser launched in 1926 and sunk in 1943.
- Italian landing helicopter dock Trieste, a landing helicopter dock ship launched in 2019
