= Italian cruiser Bolzano =

Heavy cruiser of the Italian Royal Navy

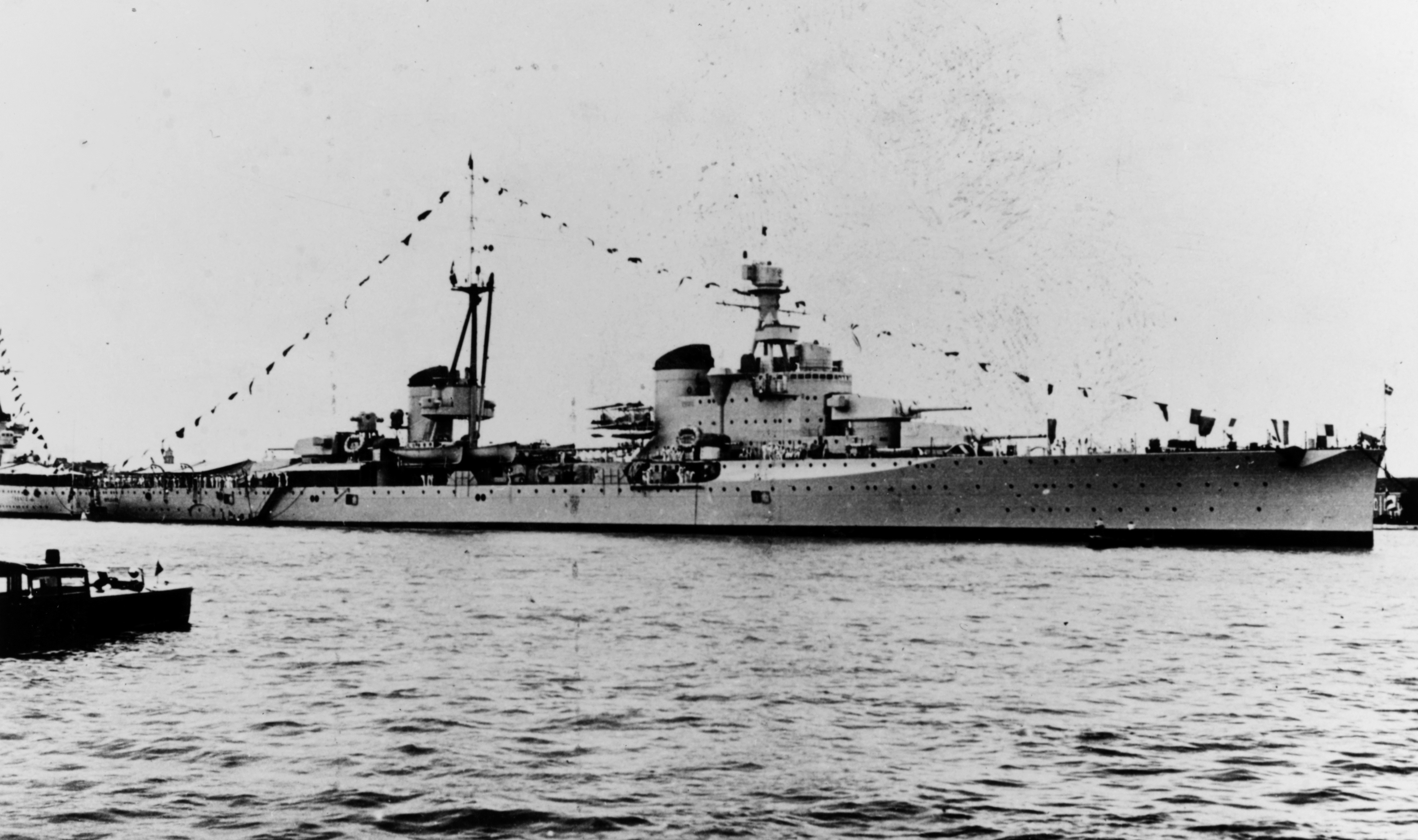
- Bolzano before World War II

Class overview
- Preceded by: Zara class
- Succeeded by: None

History

Kingdom of Italy
- Name: Bolzano
- Namesake: City of Bolzano
- Builder: Ansaldo, Genoa
- Laid down: 11 June 1930
- Launched: 31 August 1932
- Completed: 19 August 1933
- Fate: Sunk, 21 June 1944

General characteristics
- Type: Heavy cruiser
- Displacement: Normal: 10,890 long tons (11,060 t); Full load: 13,665 long tons (13,884 t)
- Length: 196.9 m (646 ft) (o/a)
- Beam: 20.6 m (67 ft 7 in)
- Draft: 6.8 m (22 ft 4 in)
- Installed power: 10 × water-tube boilers; 150,000 shaft horsepower (110,000 kW)
- Propulsion: 4 × Parsons geared steam turbines; 4 × screw propellers
- Speed: 36 knots (67 km/h; 41 mph)
- Complement: 725
- Armament: 4 × 2 - 203 mm (8 in) 53-cal. guns; 8 × 2 - 100 mm (4 in) / 47 caliber guns; 4 × 1 - Vickers-Terni 40 mm/39 guns; 8 × 13.2 mm (0.52 in) machine guns; 8 × 533 mm (21 in) torpedo tubes
- Armor: Deck: 50 mm (2 in); Belt: 70 mm (2.8 in); Turret faces: 100 mm (3.9 in); Barbettes: 70 mm
- Aircraft carried: 2–3 IMAM Ro.43 seaplanes

Bolzano was a unique heavy cruiser, sometimes considered to be a member of the Trento class, built for the Italian Regia Marina (Royal Navy) in the early 1930s, the last vessel of the type to be built by Italy. A modified version of the earlier Trento class, she had a heavier displacement, slightly shorter length, a newer model of 203 mm (8 in) gun, and a more powerful propulsion system, among other differences influenced by the Zara class that had followed the Trentos. Bolzano was built by the Gio. Ansaldo & C. between her keel laying in June 1930 and her commissioning in August 1933.

Bolzano had a fairly uneventful peacetime career, which primarily consisted of naval reviews for Italian and foreign dignitaries. She saw extensive action in the first three years of Italy's participation in World War II. She took part in the Battles of Calabria, Taranto, Cape Spartivento, and Cape Matapan. The ship was lightly damaged at Calabria, but she emerged from the other engagements unscathed. She also frequently escorted convoys to North Africa in 1941 and 1942 and patrolled for British naval forces in the central Mediterranean Sea.

The ship was torpedoed twice by British submarines; the first, in July 1941, necessitated three months of repairs. The second, in August 1942, caused extensive damage and ended the ship's career. She was eventually towed back to La Spezia, where repairs were to be completed. Resources were unavailable, however, and Bolzano remained there, out of action. Plans to convert her into a hybrid cruiser-aircraft carrier came to nothing for the same reason. After Italy surrendered to the Allies in September 1943, La Spezia was occupied by German forces; to prevent them from using her as a blockship, Italian and British frogmen sank Bolzano using Chariot manned torpedoes in June 1944. The Italian Navy ultimately raised the ship in September 1949 and broke her up for scrap.

== Design ==
Bolzano was ordered under the 1929–1930 construction program; the Regia Marina had initially planned on building six heavy cruisers in the 1920s and 1930s, which comprised the Trento and Zara classes. These vessels were to have operated as two three-ship cruiser divisions, but by 1929, the Regia Marina had decided to use Pola as a temporary fleet flagship while the Conte di Cavour-class battleships were being rebuilt. As a result, the Regia Marina, which was under intense pressure from Gio. Ansaldo & C. for a construction contract, ordered a seventh heavy cruiser. (Note: Ansaldo had to that point been left out of the cruiser construction program, the six previous cruisers having been built by STT and OTO. See: Brescia, p. 80 and Gardiner & Chesneau, pp. 291–292) A new design was prepared that was based heavily on the Trento class, but also incorporated improvements from the Zara design. These included the new, longer 203-millimeter (8 in) gun, more powerful boilers, and a stepped up forecastle deck to improve seakeeping. The high command of the Regia Marina persisted in their belief that speed was more important than armor, and so the new vessel adopted a level of protection similar to the earlier Trentos rather than the more sturdily built Zaras. The sailors of the fleet referred to Bolzano as "un errore splendidamente riuscito—an error beautifully executed" owing to her weak armor protection.

=== General characteristics and machinery ===
Bolzano was 187.6 meters (615 ft 6 in) long between perpendiculars and 196.9 m (646 ft) long overall. She had a beam of 20.6 m (67 ft 7 in) and a draft of 6.8 m (22 ft 4 in). She displaced 10,890 long tons (11,060 t) normally and up to 13,665 long tons (13,884 t) at full load, though her displacement was nominally within the 10,000-long-ton (10,160 t) restriction set in place by the Washington Naval Treaty. She had a crew of 725 officers and enlisted men as originally configured, though her wartime complement increased to 28 officers and 788 enlisted men. The ship was fitted with two tripod masts, one atop the forward superstructure and the other just forward of the rear funnel. A large, rotating aircraft catapult was located amidships, between the two funnels. She could carry two or three IMAM Ro.43 seaplanes for aerial reconnaissance.

Her power plant consisted of four Parsons geared steam turbines, which drove four screw propellers, and were powered by ten oil-fired water-tube boilers, which were trunked into two widely spaced funnels. Her engines were rated at 150,000 shaft horsepower (110,000 kW) and produced a top speed of 36 knots (67 km/h; 41 mph). While on speed trials with a light displacement of 10,847 long tons (11,021 t), she reached 36.81 knots (68.17 km/h; 42.36 mph) from 173,772 shp (129,582 kW). Electricity was provided by generators with a total output of 1,080 kilowatts (1,450 hp).

=== Armament and armor ===
Bolzano was armed with a main battery of eight 203 mm Mod 29 53-caliber guns in four gun turrets. The turrets were arranged in superfiring pairs forward and aft. Anti-aircraft defense was provided by a battery of sixteen 100 mm (4 in) 47-cal. guns in twin mounts, four Vickers-Terni 40 mm (1.6 in) 39-cal. guns in single mounts and eight 13.2 mm (0.52 in) guns in twin mounts. Bolzano's secondary battery was revised several times during her career. Two of the 100 mm guns were removed in the late 1930s and eight 37 mm (1.5 in) 54-cal. guns were installed in their place. The eight 13.2 mm (0.52 in) guns were replaced with four 20 mm (0.79 in) 65-cal. anti-aircraft guns in 1942. She also carried a battery of eight 533 mm (21.0 in) torpedo tubes mounted in four above-water, twin launchers.

She was protected with an armored belt that was 70 mm (2.8 in) thick amidships, and capped with transverse, armored bulkheads on either end of the citadel. The forward bulkhead was 60 mm (2.4 in) and the aft was 50 mm (2 in). Her armor deck was 50 mm thick in the central portion of the ship and reduced to 20 mm (0.79 in) at either end. The gun turrets had 100 mm (3.9 in) thick plating on the faces and the barbettes they sat in were 60–70 mm thick. The main conning tower had 100 mm thick sides and a 40 mm (1.6 in) thick roof.

== Service history ==
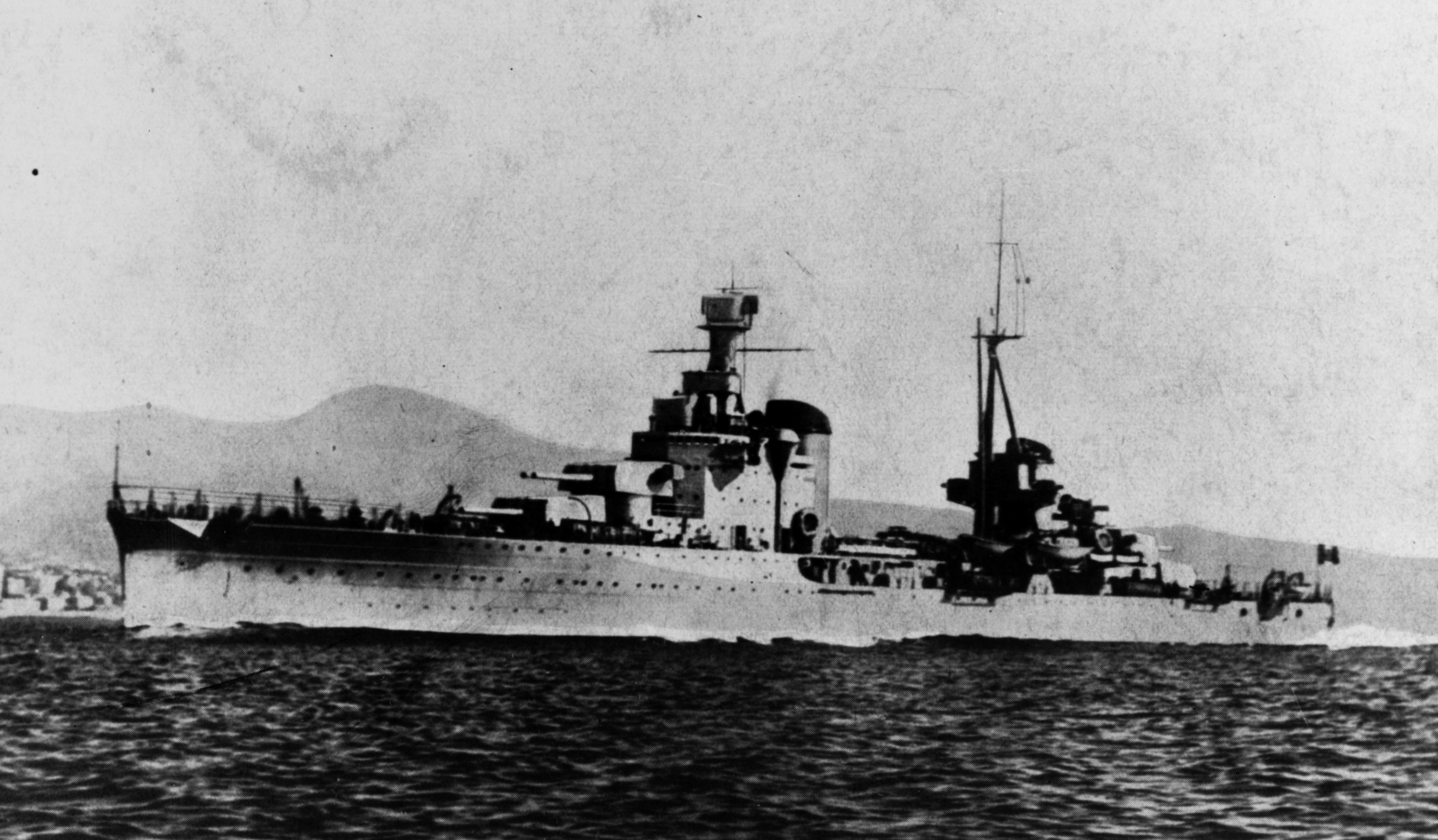
Bolzano shortly after completion

The keel for Bolzano was laid down at Ansaldo's shipyard in Genoa on 11 June 1930, and her completed hull was launched on 31 August 1932. The ship was completed on 19 August 1933 and commissioned into the Italian fleet. On 2 December, Bolzano joined Trento and Trieste in the 2nd Division of the 1st Squadron. The ship received her battle flag on 29 June 1934 at a ceremony held in the Grand Canal of Venice, in company with Trento. The following month, the 2nd Division became the 3rd Division. On 27 November 1936, she took part in a naval review for the Regent of Hungary, Miklós Horthy. From 10 to 12 March 1937, Bolzano escorted the Italian dictator Benito Mussolini on a cruise to Italian Libya.

The ship steamed to the Balearic Islands to retrieve the bodies of six Italian sailors who had been killed on 25 May aboard the auxiliary cruiser Barletta by Republican bombers during the Spanish Civil War; Bolzano arrived back in Italy on 3 June. Four days later, she took part in training exercises in the Gulf of Naples; these were held during the visit of German Field Marshal Werner von Blomberg. Another major fleet review took place on 5 May 1938, this time to honor German dictator Adolf Hitler during his state visit. Mussolini visited Bolzano in January 1939 while she was stationed in La Maddalena, Sardinia. The ship took part in a review for Prince Paul of Yugoslavia in the Gulf of Naples on 17 May. She was also present during the first Navy Day celebration, held between 5 and 19 June in Livorno.

=== World War II ===
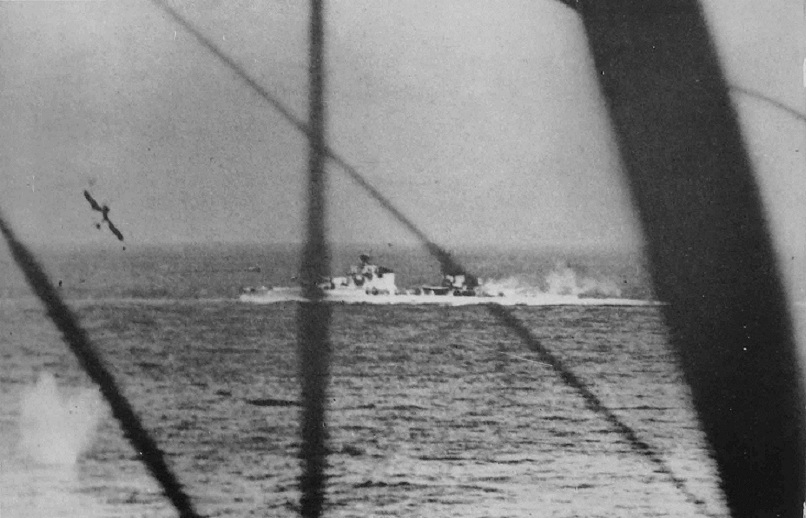
Bolzano under air torpedo attack at Cape Matapan

Upon Italy's entrance into the Second World War on 10 June 1940, Bolzano was assigned to the 2nd Division in the 2nd Squadron, along with the two Trento-class cruisers. On 9 July, the ship took part in the Battle of Calabria; there, she led the line of Italian heavy cruisers as they engaged their British counterparts. She was hit by a salvo of three 6-inch (152 mm) shells at 16:05 that killed two crewmen and jammed her rudder to port, forcing her to turn in a tight circle. The shells also hit her forward superfiring gun turret, though it was still able to fire. The hits had come from the light cruiser HMS Neptune. After the two fleets disengaged, Italian aircraft misidentified the ship as a British vessel and attacked her, though they failed to score any hits. She reached La Spezia on 12 July, where her battle damage was repaired. By the night of 11–12 November, Bolzano had been moved to Taranto; she was present during the raid on Taranto that night, but was not attacked by the British torpedo bombers. A wave of horizontal bombers was tasked with attacking Bolzano and the two Trentos, but their captains decided to hold their fire; as a result, the British aircraft were unable to locate the three cruisers in the darkness and they attacked other vessels.

On 26 November, Bolzano and the rest of the fleet sortied to intercept a British convoy to Malta. In the ensuing Battle of Cape Spartivento, Bolzano engaged the battlecruiser HMS Renown, but neither ship scored any hits before both sides broke off the action. She took part in the sweep into the eastern Mediterranean in late March 1941 that resulted in the Battle of Cape Matapan. During the battle, British torpedo bombers attacked Bolzano but she successfully evaded their torpedoes. Bolzano thereafter took part in escort duties for convoys to Tripoli for the next several months to support the Axis forces fighting the North African Campaign. The first such convoy took place on 24–30 April. Another followed a month later on 24–27 May, and two were conducted in June, on 8–9 and 25 June – 1 July. She protected a fifth convoy that steamed to Tripoli and back on 16–20 July. Convoy operations were interrupted in late August by an unsuccessful sweep to locate British warships. While returning to port via the Strait of Messina, Bolzano was torpedoed by the British submarine HMS Triumph. She was towed to Messina by a pair of tugs, where repairs were effected, lasting three months. She was back in service in time to escort another convoy to Tripoli on 8–9 November.

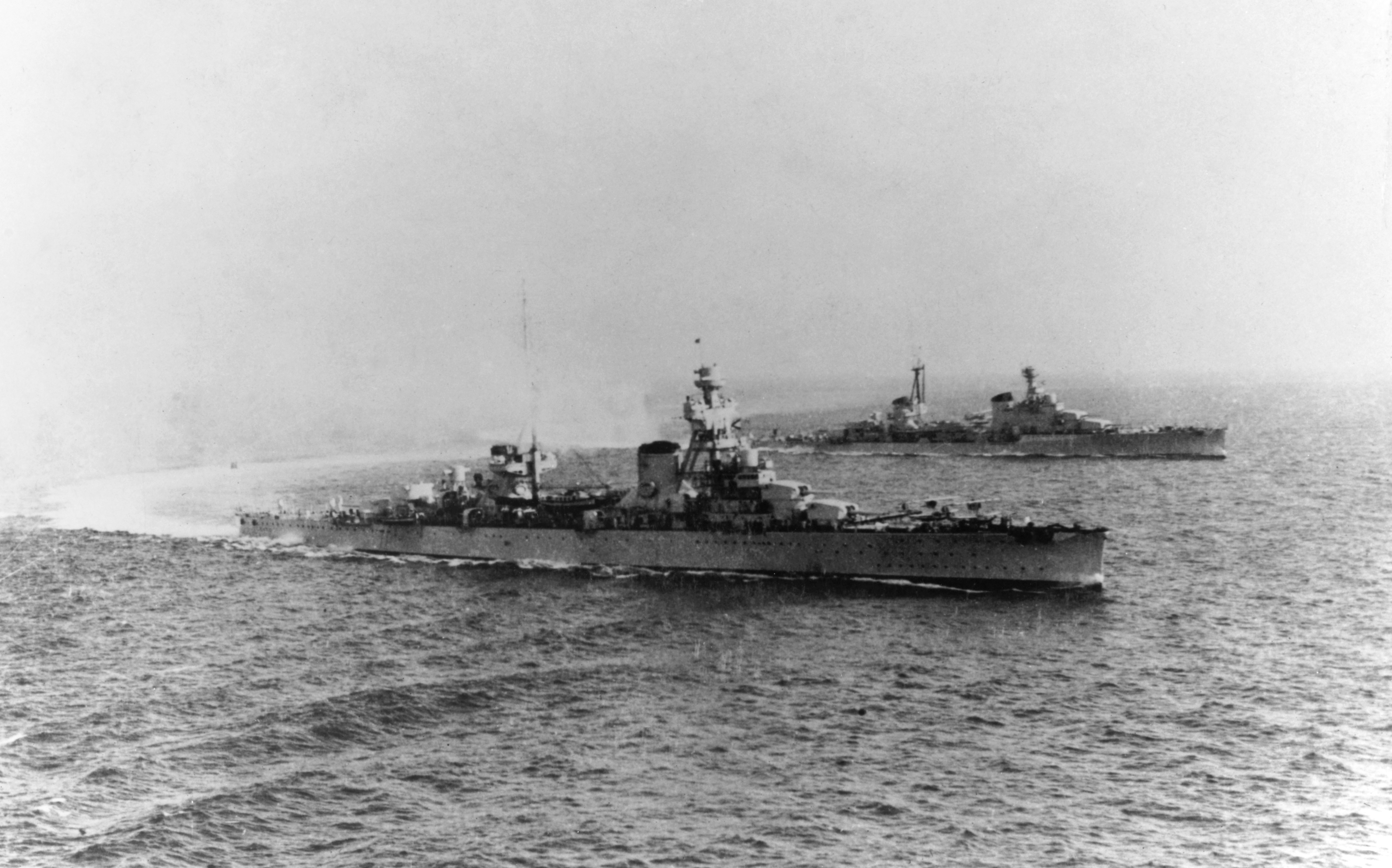
Trento (center) and Bolzano (background) underway

Umberto, Prince of Piedmont, heir to the italian throne, visited the ship while she was in Messina on 17 July 1942. By August, the surviving Italian heavy cruisers, Bolzano, Trieste, and Gorizia had been reorganized as the 3rd Division. On 11 August, the three cruisers sortied to intercept a British convoy, but were eventually ordered back after the Luftwaffe denied air support. In the return trip, Bolzano was torpedoed by the submarine HMS Unbroken, causing extensive damage. The torpedo explosion started a fire, prompting the crew to flood the forward magazines to prevent the fire from spreading to them and detonating the propellant charges stored there. To keep her from sinking, her crew beached the ship on the island of Panarea. The ship was listing 45 degrees and the crew had to abandon the ship. The fire burned through the next day, until some of the crew were able to return to extinguish it. She remained there until 15 September, by which time damage control parties had shored up the damaged hull enough to allow tugs to tow her back to Naples, where she entered the drydock so the damage could be inspected. Temporary repairs were effected, and in October she was transferred further north, to La Spezia, where permanent repairs would be completed. While she was awaiting repairs, the Regia Marina considered rebuilding the ship into a hybrid cruiser-aircraft carrier. This would have required removing the bridge structure and forward gun turrets, and splitting the forward funnel to vent on either side of the ship so a flight deck and hangar could be installed. The proposal came to nothing, however, as the Italian war economy could not spare the necessary resources to repair Bolzano, let alone convert her. Piecemeal repairs were made as material became available through early 1943, but she remained out of action. On 5 June, American B-17 bombers attacked La Spezia but did not damage Bolzano.

On 3 September 1943, Italy surrendered to the Allies, and on 8–9 September, German troops occupied La Spezia. As the ship was still in an unusable condition, her crew did not scuttle Bolzano, instead leaving her partially afloat. During the German occupation, they cannibalized Bolzano and the also-damaged Gorizia for useful parts but otherwise did not make use of her. On the night of 21–22 June 1944, a team of British and Italian frogmen—Italy having re-entered the war on the side of the Allies—entered La Spezia using Chariot manned torpedoes to sink Bolzano and Gorizia to prevent the Germans from sinking them as blockships. They succeeded in sinking Bolzano but Gorizia remained afloat. Bolzano was formally stricken from the naval register on 27 February 1947, and in September 1949, salvage workers raised the ship and she was subsequently broken up for scrap.
