= 203 mm/50 Model 1924 =

203 mm /50 Model 1924
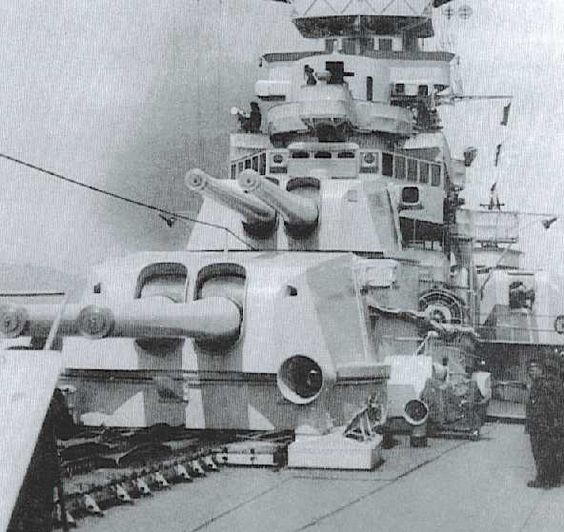
- Model 1924 guns of the heavy cruiser Trieste.
- Type: Naval gun Coastal defense gun
- Place of origin: Italy

Service history
- In service: 1928—1945
- Used by: Italy
- Wars: World War II

Production history
- Designed: 1924
- Manufacturer: Ansaldo

Specifications
- Mass: 21.4 metric tons
- Length: 10.53 meters (34 ft 7 in)
- Barrel length: 10.16 meters (33 ft 4 in) 50 caliber
- Shell weight: Early: 125.3 kilograms (276 lb); Late: 118 kilograms (260 lb)
- Caliber: 203 millimeters (8.0 in)
- Breech: Welin breech block
- Elevation: -7° to +45°
- Traverse: -150° to +150°
- Rate of fire: 3 rpm
- Muzzle velocity: Early: 905 m/s (2,970 ft/s); Late: 840 m/s (2,800 ft/s)
- Maximum firing range: Early: 31.32 kilometres (19.46 mi) at +45° Late: 28 kilometres (17 mi) at +45°

The 203 mm /50 Model 1924 was an Italian 203 mm (8 inch) naval gun. Manufactured by the Ansaldo engineering company in the years before World War II for the Italian Navy, the use of these guns was limited to the Trento-class heavy cruisers and coastal defense batteries during the Second World War.

== Construction ==
These guns were of built-up construction with a fixed liner, autofretted barrel, and a Welin breech block. The gun mounts had electrically powered training, elevation, hoists and rammers. There was no swinging arm, and shell hoists were of pusher type with loading at +15°. These guns suffered from dispersion problems (due to the turret design of the Trento-class cruisers), so the original muzzle velocity of 905 metres per second (2,970 ft/s) was reduced to 840 metres per second (2,800 ft/s) for armor-piercing shells. Shell weight was also reduced from 125.3 kilograms (276 lb) to 118 kilograms (260 lb) in an attempt to resolve these problems, but these efforts were only partially successful. The main reason for the dispersion problem was because the guns were mounted too close together on a common cradle, which together with a narrow 4.52 metres (14.8 ft) ball track complicated loading of the guns.

== Naval Service ==
This gun was limited to two superfiring twin-mount turrets forward and aft on the heavy cruisers Trento and Trieste during World War II.

== Coastal Defense Service ==
One spare turret was used for coastal defense.

== Ammunition ==
Ammunition was of separate loading type. The AP projectile was 84.7 centimetres (2.78 ft) long with a single bagged charge which weighed 47.3 kilograms (104 lb).

The gun was able to fire:

- Armor Piercing (early) - 125.3 kg (276 lb)
- Armor Piercing (late) - 118 kg (260 lb)
- High Explosive - 110.57 kg (243.8 lb)
