= HMS Berwick (65) =

County-class cruiser

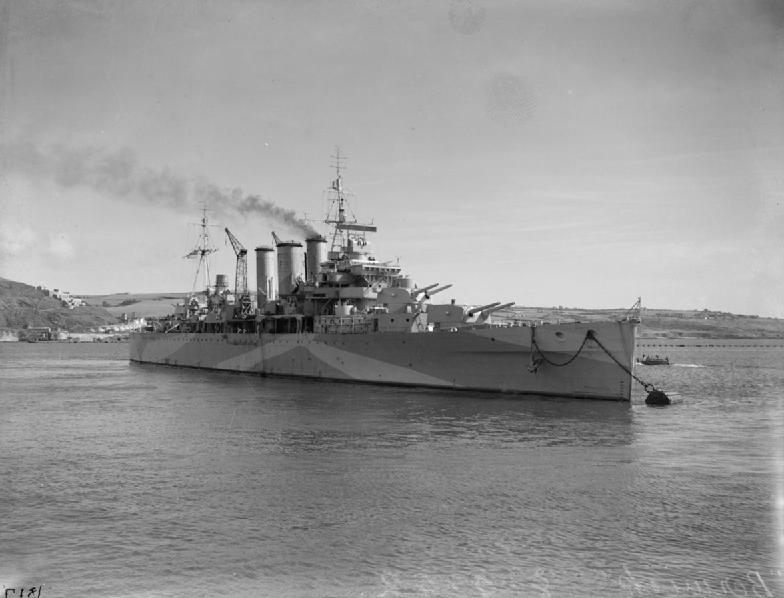

History

United Kingdom
- Name: HMS Berwick
- Builder: Fairfield Shipbuilding and Engineering Company, Govan
- Laid down: 15 September 1924
- Launched: 30 March 1926
- Commissioned: 12 July 1927
- Decommissioned: 1946
- Identification: Pennant number 65
- Fate: Allocated to British Iron & Steel Corporation for scrapping on 15 June 1948 and arrived at Hughes Bolckow, Blyth, on 12 July for breaking up.

General characteristics
- Class & type: County-class heavy cruiser
- Displacement: 9,750 tons (9,924 t) standard; 13,450 tons (13,670 t) full load
- Length: 630 ft (190 m)
- Beam: 68 ft 3 in (20.80 m)
- Draught: 16 ft 3 in (4.95 m)
- Propulsion: Eight Admiralty 3-drum boilers; Four shaft Brown Curtis geared turbines; 80,000 shp
- Speed: 31.5 knots (58.3 km/h)
- Range: 3,100 nautical miles at 31.5 knots (5,740 km at 58 km/h), 13,300 nautical miles at 12 knots (24,600 km at 22 km/h); 3,400 tons (3,450 t) fuel oil
- Complement: 700
- Armament: Original configuration: 8 × 8-inch (203 mm) guns (4 × 2); 4 × 4-inch (102 mm) ant-aircraft guns (4 × 1); 8 × 2-pounder (40 mm) AA pom-poms (2 × 4); 8 × 0.5-inch (12.7 mm) machine guns (2 × 4); 8 × 21-inch (533 mm) torpedo tubes (2 × 4); 1938–1941: 8 × 8-inch (203 mm) guns (4 × 2); 8 × 4-inch (102 mm) anti-aircraft guns (4 × 2); 16 × 2-pounder (40 mm) pom-poms (2 × 8); 8 × 0.5-inch machine guns (2 × 4); 1941–1945: 8 × 8-inch (203 mm) guns (4 × 2); 8 × 4-inch (102 mm) anti-aircraft guns (4 × 2); 16 × 2-pounder (40 mm) pom-poms (2 × 8); 2 × single 20-mm Oerlikon anti-aircraft guns (2 × 1); 14 × 20-mm Oerlikon anti-aircraft guns (7 × 2)
- Armour: Original configuration: 1 to 4 in magazine box protection; 1.375 in deck; 1 in side-plating, turrets and bulkheads; 4.5 in belt; 4 internal boiler room sides (added 1936–1940)
- Aircraft carried: Three aircraft with one catapult, removed in 1942

HMS Berwick, pennant number 65, was a County-class heavy cruiser of the British Royal Navy, part of the Kent subclass. She was built by Fairfield Shipbuilding and Engineering Company, Govan, Scotland, with the keel being laid down on 15 September 1924. She was launched on 30 March 1926 and commissioned 12 July 1927. When completed, Berwick was sent to the China Station, where she remained until a temporary detachment to the Mediterranean in 1936. Along with the rest of her Kent class sub-group of County-class ships, Berwick underwent reconstruction between 1937 and 1938, where her single 4-inch guns were replaced with double mounts, numerous light machine guns were added, along with a significant addition of note; a cemented 4-inch (100 mm) thick and 6 feet (1.8 m) deep armoured belt was added to both sides of her hull beginning at the armoured deck down past her water line.

== History ==
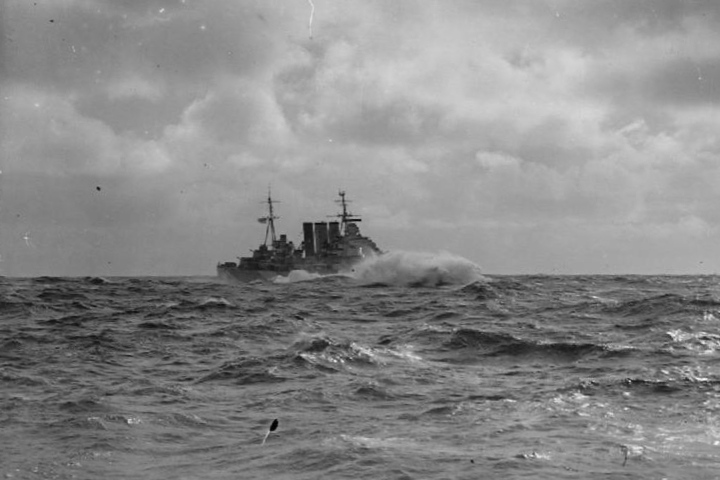
HMS Berwick off the Norwegian coast in rough seas

After these modifications, she completed her sea trials and then proceeded west, to serve on the North America and West Indies Station with the 8th Cruiser Squadron, arriving on 18 January 1939. Once there, she replaced HMS York as station flagship. When the Second World War started, she served on ocean convoy escort duties, then formed part of Force "F", with York, when hunting groups were created to find German raiders. She did not make contact with any raider, but did intercept the mercantile blockade runners Wolfsburg and Uruguay in the Denmark Straits during March 1940.

On 9 April 1940 she participated in the Norwegian Campaign and on 10 May 1940 in the Invasion of Iceland. She was then allocated to Force "H" at Gibraltar arriving on 7 November. On 27 November, while taking part in Operation Collar, Berwick was hit by a 203 mm (8.0 in)-shell from an Italian heavy cruiser, either Pola or Fiume, which knocked out her "Y" turret and killed seven men. A second round that struck her some minutes later destroyed the aft electric switchboard, leaving the cruiser's aft section without power. Some sources credit the second hit to an Italian Trento-class cruiser, either lead ship Trento or her sister-ship Trieste, the only Italian Royal Navy heavy cruisers within range at the time of the strikes.

On 25 December 1940, Berwick engaged the German heavy cruiser Admiral Hipper off the Canaries when she formed part of the escort to convoy WS-5A, a troop convoy to the Middle East. Despite being thoroughly ready for combat, Berwick got the worst of the encounter. She scored no hits on Admiral Hipper, and sustained a fair amount of damage, being hit by several 8-inch (which for the most part passed right through the ship) and 4.1-inch shells. The action did however, drive off Admiral Hipper, and saved the convoy from any losses. Four of her complement were killed and she had to return to Britain for repairs, which lasted until June 1941.

When repaired, Berwick joined the Home Fleet and for the remainder of her wartime career she was escorting convoys to North Russia and operating in the northern North Sea, where she served under the captaincy of Norman Grace from January to August 1944. In late October 1944 the ship carried Free Norwegian Forces from Britain to Murmansk, so that they could participate in the Liberation of Finnmark. She escorted two carrier raids against the German battleship Tirpitz in 1944 and again in 1945. Berwick's last role was to escort carriers that were raiding the Norwegian coast in 1945.

After the war she was allocated to BISCO for scrapping on 15 June 1948 and arrived at Hughes Bolckow, Blyth, on 12 July for breaking up.
