= Italian cruiser Trento =

Heavy cruiser of the Italian Royal Navy

Coordinates: 36.1667°N 18.6667°E

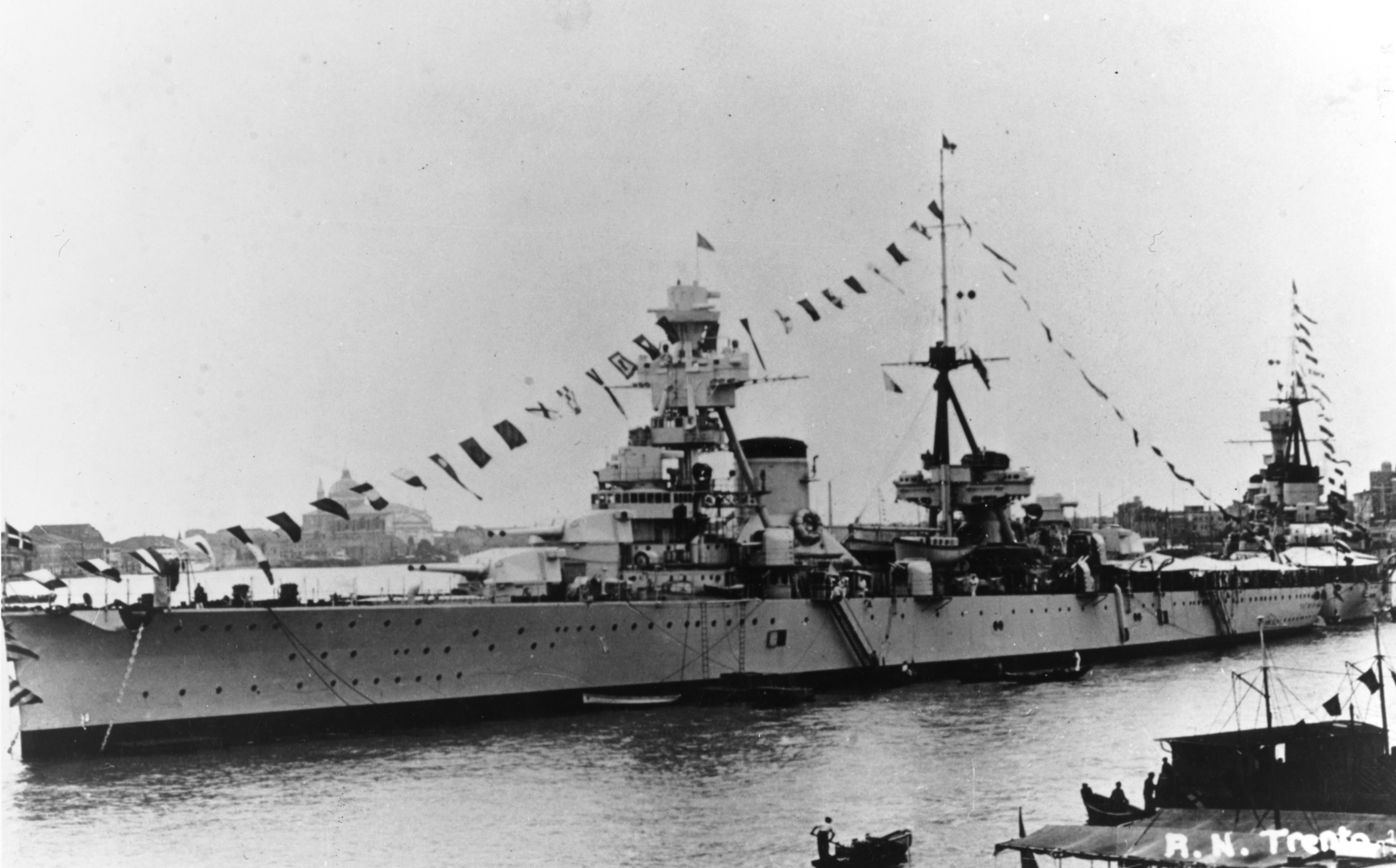
- Trento early in her career

History

Kingdom of Italy
- Name: Trento
- Namesake: City of Trento
- Builder: Cantiere navale fratelli Orlando, Livorno
- Laid down: 8 February 1925
- Launched: 4 October 1927
- Commissioned: 3 April 1929
- Stricken: 18 October 1946
- Fate: Sunk, 15 June 1942

General characteristics
- Class & type: Trento class
- Type: Heavy cruiser
- Displacement: Full load: 13,334 long tons (13,548 t)
- Length: 196.96 m (646 ft 2 in)
- Beam: 20.6 m (67 ft 7 in)
- Draft: 6.8 m (22 ft 4 in)
- Installed power: 12 × Yarrow boilers; 150,000 shp (110,000 kW)
- Propulsion: 4 × Parsons steam turbines; 4 × screw propellers
- Speed: Trials: 35.6 kn (65.9 km/h; 41.0 mph); Service: 31 kn (57 km/h; 36 mph)
- Range: 4,160 nmi (7,700 km; 4,790 mi) at 16 kn (30 km/h; 18 mph)
- Complement: Peacetime: 723; Wartime: 781
- Armament: 8 × 203 mm (8 in) / 50 caliber guns; 16 × 100 mm (4 in) / 47 caliber guns; 8 × Vickers-Terni 40 mm (1.6 in) anti-aircraft guns; 8 × 13.2 mm (0.52 in) machine guns; 8 × 533 mm (21 in) torpedo tubes
- Armor: Belt: 70 mm (2.8 in); Deck: 20 to 50 mm (0.79 to 1.97 in) deck; Turrets: 100 mm (3.9 in); Conning tower: 100 mm (3.9 in)
- Aircraft carried: 2 × IMAM Ro.43 seaplanes

Trento was the first of two Trento-class cruisers; they were the first heavy cruisers built for the Italian Regia Marina (Royal Navy). The ship was laid down in February 1925, launched in October 1927, and was commissioned in April 1929. Trento was very lightly armored, with only a 70 mm (2.8 in) thick armored belt, though she possessed a high speed and heavy main battery of eight 203 mm (8 in) guns. Though nominally built under the restrictions of the Washington Naval Treaty, the two cruisers significantly exceeded the displacement limits imposed by the treaty.

Trento frequently served as the flagship of the Cruiser Division throughout the 1930s. During the pre-war period, she also made lengthy trips abroad, including a tour of South America from May to October 1929 and a deployment to China from January to June 1932 to protect Italian nationals during the Chinese Civil War. She also took part in numerous naval reviews held for visiting foreign leaders.

After Italy entered World War II in June 1940, Trento saw extensive action in the Mediterranean Sea, including at the battles of Calabria, Cape Spartivento, and Cape Matapan in July and November 1940 and March 1941, respectively. She was also present during the inconclusive First and Second Battles of Sirte, and at the latter she severely damaged a British destroyer. Trento was also frequently tasked with escorting convoys to supply Italian forces in North Africa as well as interdicting British convoys to Malta. During one of the latter missions to attack the British Operation Harpoon convoy in June 1942, Trento was torpedoed twice, first by a Bristol Beaufort torpedo bomber and then sunk by the submarine HMS Umbra with very heavy loss of life.

== Design ==
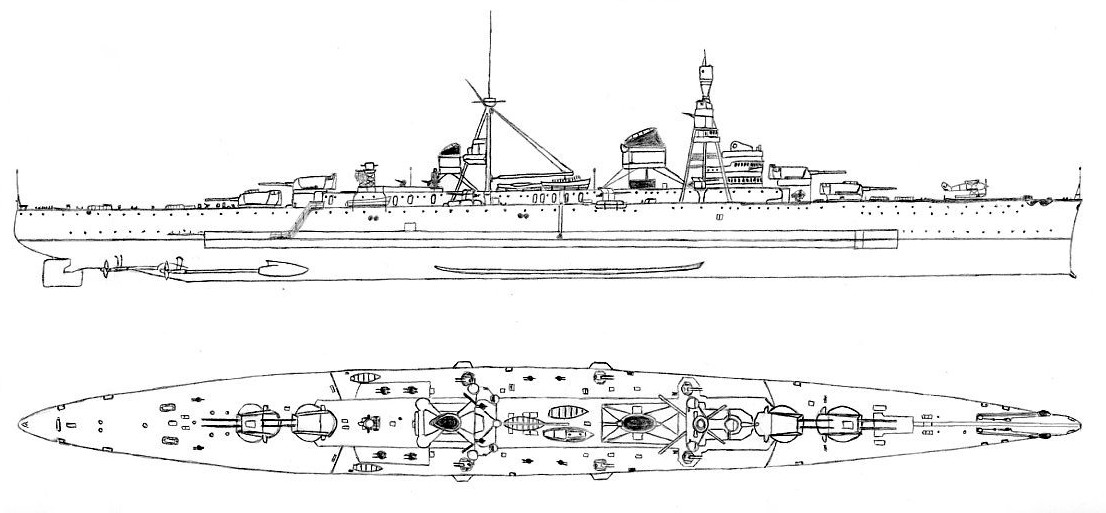
Plan and profile drawing of Trento

Trento was 196.96 meters (646 ft 2 in) long overall, with a beam of 20.6 m (67 ft 7 in) and a draft of 6.8 m (22 ft 4 in). She displaced 13,334 long tons (13,548 t) at full load, though her displacement was nominally within the 10,000-long-ton (10,160 t) restriction set in place by the Washington Naval Treaty. The ship's superstructure included a large conning tower forward and a smaller, secondary conning position aft. She was fitted with a pair of tripod masts, one just aft of the conning tower and the second further aft. She had a crew of 723 officers and enlisted men, though during the war this increased to 781.

Her power plant consisted of four Parsons steam turbines powered by twelve oil-fired Yarrow boilers, which were trunked into two funnels amidships. Her engines were rated at 150,000 shaft horsepower (110,000 kW) for a top speed of 36 knots (67 km/h; 41 mph). On trials, she reached only 35.6 knots (65.9 km/h; 41.0 mph), and in service, her practical top speed was only 31 knots (57 km/h; 36 mph). The ship had a cruising range of 4,160 nautical miles (7,700 km; 4,790 mi) at a speed of 16 knots (30 km/h; 18 mph).

Trento was armed with a main battery of eight 203 mm (8 in) Mod 24 50-caliber guns in four gun turrets. The turrets were arranged in superfiring pairs forward and aft. Anti-aircraft defense was provided by a battery of sixteen 100 mm (4 in) 47-cal. guns in twin mounts, four Vickers-Terni 40 mm/39 guns in single mounts and four 12.7 mm (0.50 in) machine guns. In addition to the gun armament, she carried eight 533 mm (21 in) torpedo tubes in four deck mounted twin launchers. She carried a pair of IMAM Ro.43 seaplanes for aerial reconnaissance; the hangar was located under the forecastle and a fixed catapult was mounted on the centerline at the bow.

Trento's secondary battery was revised several times during her career. The 100 mm guns were replaced with newer Mod 31 versions of the same caliber. In 1937–1938, the two aft-most 100 mm guns were removed, along with all four 12.7 mm machine guns; eight 37 mm (1.5 in) 54-cal. Breda M1932 guns and eight 13.2 mm (0.52 in) Breda M1931 machine guns, all in twin mounts, were installed in their place. In 1942, the ship received four 20 mm (0.79 in) 65-cal. Breda M1940 guns in single mounts.

She was protected with an armor belt that was 70 mm (2.8 in) thick amidships with armored bulkheads 40 to 60 mm (1.6 to 2.4 in) thick on either end. Her armor deck was 50 mm (2 in) thick in the central portion of the ship and reduced to 20 mm (0.79 in) at either end. The gun turrets had 100 mm (3.9 in) thick plating on the faces and the supporting barbettes they sat in were 60 to 70 mm (2.4 to 2.8 in) thick. The main conning tower had 100 mm thick sides.

== Service history ==
The keel for Trento was laid down at the Cantiere navale fratelli Orlando on 8 February 1925. The completed hull was scheduled to be launched on 4 September 1927, but sabotage from anti-fascist workers in the shipyard, who had mixed sand into the grease on the slipway, preventing the ship from sliding down into the water. After repeated attempts to complete the launching, the shipyard had to resort to dragging Trento from the slipway on 4 October 1927 using the passenger ship SS Principe di Udine. After fitting-out work was completed, the ship was commissioned into the Italian fleet on 3 April 1929. On 11 May 1929, Trento became the flagship of the Cruiser Division; five days later, she and her sister Trieste began a cruise in the northern Mediterranean, which included a stop in Barcelona. The two cruisers returned to La Spezia on 4 June. Trento started a much more ambitious cruise the following month, departing Italian waters on 23 July, bound for South America. Over the following three months, she visited Cape Verde, Rio de Janeiro, Santos, Montevideo, Buenos Aires, Bahía Blanca, Las Palmas, and Tangiers, before arriving back in Italy on 10 October.

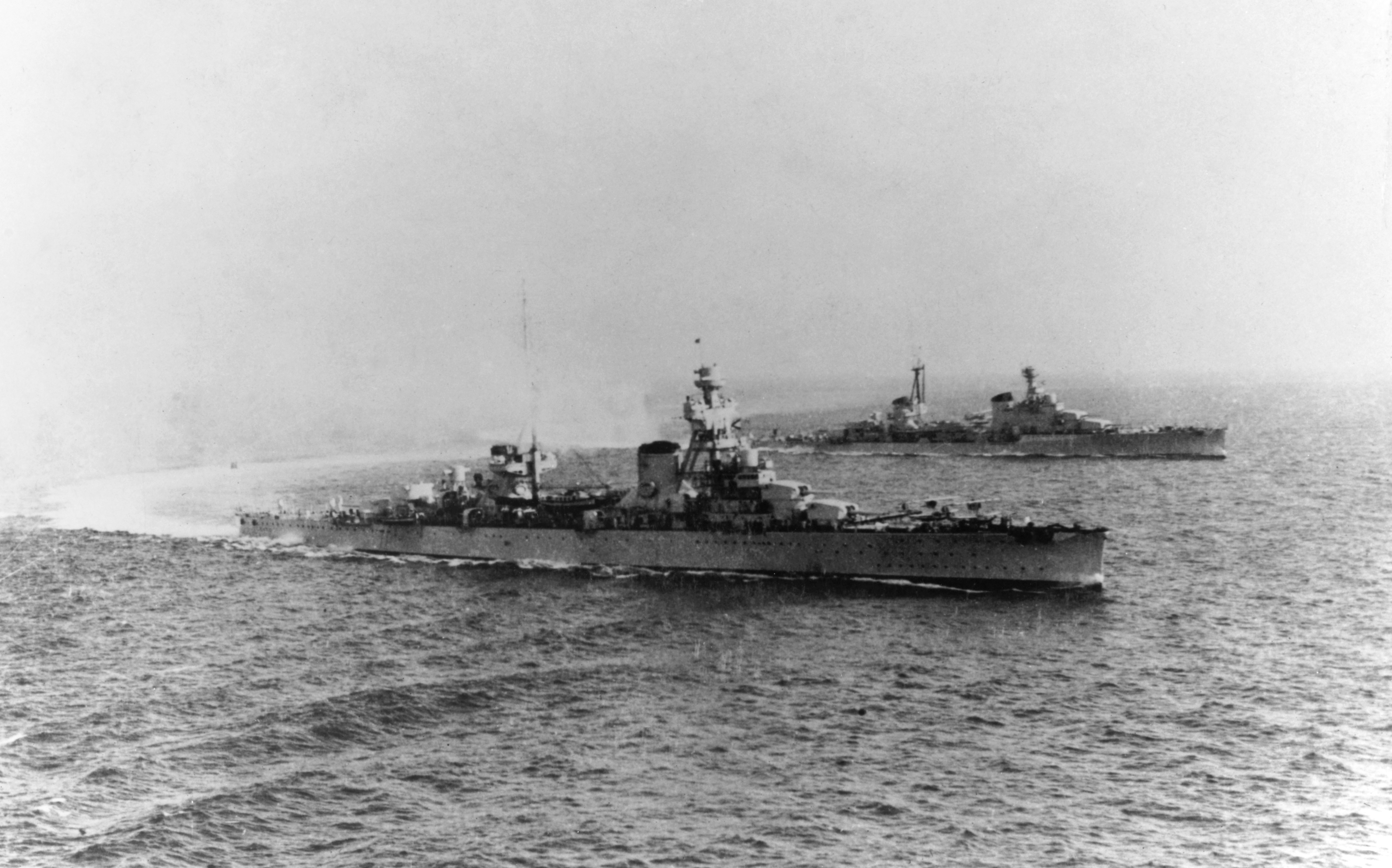
Trento (center) and Bolzano (background) underway

On 15 September 1930, Trento embarked on a cruise to the eastern Mediterranean that concluded in La Spezia on 21 November. In mid-1931, she entered the drydock in La Spezia for modifications to her tripod foremast; a sturdier five-legged version was installed to reduce vibration in the fire control director. On 28 January 1932, Trento steamed to Gaeta, where she and the destroyer Espero took on a contingent from the San Marco Battalion. The two ships then departed, bound for China, where they reinforced the Italian Far East Division, which included the old protected cruiser Libia and the gunboats Sebastiano Caboto and Ermanno Carlotto. The force was tasked with protecting Italian nationals in the country during the Chinese Civil War. The ships stopped in Port Said, Aden, Colombo, and Singapore en route to Shanghai, where they arrived on 4 March. From 26 April to 1 May, Trento visited Nagasaki, Japan. Two weeks later, on 14 May, Trento left Shanghai to return to Italy, arriving in La Spezia on 30 June.

On 6–7 July 1933, Trento took part in a major fleet review held in the Gulf of Naples for Italian dictator Benito Mussolini. Trento became the flagship of the 2nd Division, 1st Squadron on 2 December. The ship visited Durazzo on 23–26 June 1934, and on 1 July, became the flagship of the 3rd Division. She made another cruise in the eastern Mediterranean from 8 to 20 March 1935, during which she made calls in Rhodes and Leros. On 18 June, Trieste temporarily relieved Trento as the divisional flagship. Another naval review was held in the Gulf of Naples on 27 November 1936, to honor the Regent of Hungary, Miklós Horthy, who was visiting Italy at the time. Trieste again replaced Trento as the flagship on 27 January 1937. From 10 to 12 March 1937, Mussolini took a short tour of Italian Libya aboard the heavy cruiser Pola, escorted by Trento. The two cruisers stopped in Benghazi, Tripoli, and Ra's Lanuf during the trip.

The ship participated in another fleet review on 5 May 1938, this one held in honor of German dictator Adolf Hitler's state visit to Italy. Another review, for Prince Paul of Yugoslavia, was conducted on 17 May 1939 in the Gulf of Naples. From 5 to 19 June, Trento joined the rest of the fleet in Livorno for the first celebration of Navy Day on 10 June. Another cruise in the eastern Mediterranean followed on 9 July, during which Trento stopped in Tripoli, Tobruk, Rhodes, and Leros, before returning to Taranto on the 29th of the month. From October to December, the ship underwent a major refit, which included modifications to her armament and the installation of funnel caps.

=== World War II ===
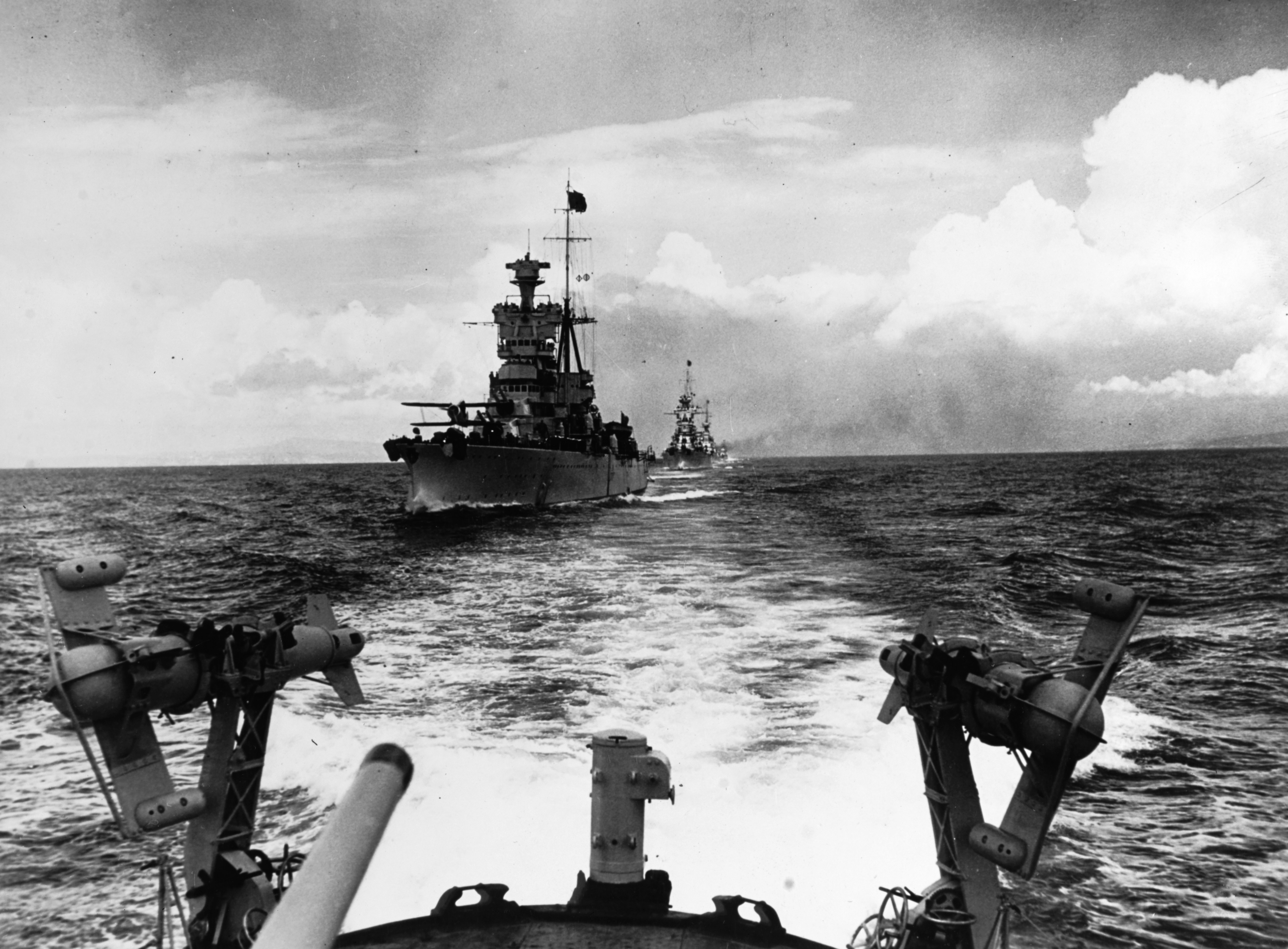
Trento and Trieste in the late 1930s, seen from the stern of a torpedo boat

On 10 June 1940, Italy declared war on France and Britain, joining its ally Germany in World War II. At that time, Trento was stationed in Messina, once again the flagship of the 3rd Division. The following day, Trento and the rest of the 3rd Division joined the 6th Division for a patrol in the Strait of Sicily, where they laid a minefield. On 8 July, the 3rd Division escorted a convoy to Libya, along with the battleships of the 1st Division; the next day, the returning warships collided with a heavily protected British convoy. In the ensuing Battle of Calabria, Trento engaged British cruisers and was heavily attacked by British aircraft, though she emerged undamaged. A force of 120 Italian aircraft arrived after both fleets had disengaged, and some Italian pilots accidentally attacked Italian vessels, prompting the fleet to paint red stripes on the forecastles of each ship. Another convoy to Libya, which passed without incident, followed on 30 July, with Trento returning to Messina on 1 August. On 31 August, the 3rd Division sortied to intercept the British convoys in Operation Hats, though the Italian fleet broke off the operation without encountering the merchant ships. Trento arrived back in Taranto on 2 September.

Early on the morning of 12 October, Italian destroyers and torpedo boats engaged a pair of British cruisers in the Battle of Cape Passero; one of the destroyers, Artigliere, was badly damaged in the action. Trento, Trieste, and Bolzano were ordered to relieve the Italian light forces at 08:00, though this was far too late to save Artigliere, which was sunk about an hour later. While on the way back, British aircraft attacked the Italian cruisers without success. On 21 October, Trento was moved to Taranto, and she was present in the harbor on the night of 11–12 November, when the British raided the port. During the attack, a single bomb hit the ship, though it failed to explode. It nevertheless damaged the forward 100 mm mount on the port side.

On 26 November, Trento sortied with the fleet, in an attempt to intercept another convoy to Malta. The following morning, a reconnaissance floatplane from Bolzano located the British squadron. Shortly after 12:00, Italian reconnaissance reports informed the Italian fleet commander, Vice Admiral Inigo Campioni of the strength of the British fleet, and so he ordered his ships to disengage. By this time, Trento and the other heavy cruisers had already begun engaging their British counterparts in the Battle of Cape Spartivento, and had scored two hits on the cruiser HMS Berwick, the second of which is credited to either Trieste or Trento. The battlecruiser HMS Renown intervened to protect the British cruisers, which forced Campioni to commit the battleship Vittorio Veneto to the battle. This in turn forced the British cruisers to break off the action, allowing both sides to disengage.

==== Battle of Cape Matapan ====
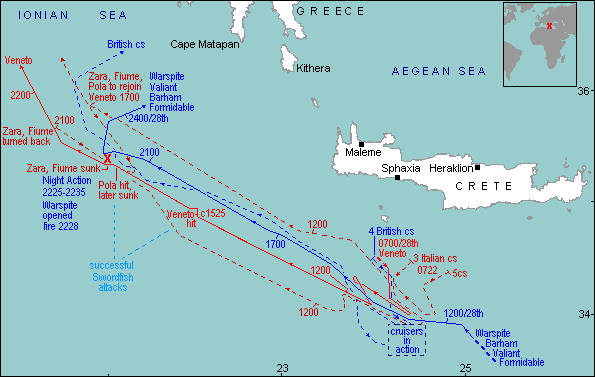
Map showing the movements of the Italian and British fleets

The 3rd Division escorted another convoy to North Africa on 12–13 March 1941. Two weeks later, on 27 March, the division—at this time commanded by Rear Admiral Luigi Sansonetti—sortied with the rest of the fleet for a major sweep toward the island of Crete. At 06:55 on the 28th, an IMAM Ro.43 floatplane launched by Vittorio Veneto located a British cruiser squadron, and by 07:55, Trento and the 3rd Division had come within visual range. Seventeen minutes later, the Italian cruisers opened fire from a range of 24,000 yd (22,000 m), initiating the first phase of the Battle of Cape Matapan; in the span of the next forty minutes, Trento fired a total of 204 armor-piercing shells, though trouble with her rangefinders and the extreme range of the action prevented her from scoring any significant hits.

At 08:55, the Italian fleet commander, Vice Admiral Angelo Iachino instructed Sansonetti to break off the action with the British cruisers and turn northwest, to lure the British vessels into range for Vittorio Veneto. By about 11:00, Vittorio Veneto had closed the distance enough to open fire, prompting Sansonetti to turn his three cruisers back to join the fight. The 6-inch-gun-armed British cruisers were outmatched both by the Italian heavy cruisers and Vittorio Veneto, and they quickly reversed course. While the two sides were still maneuvering, a group of British torpedo bombers from Crete arrived and unsuccessfully attacked Trento and the rest of her division shortly after 12:00. Further attacks from the aircraft carrier HMS Formidable convinced Iachino to break off the action and withdraw at 12:20.

Later in the day, Vittorio Veneto and Pola were torpedoed by British aircraft, the latter left immobilized. Trento, Trieste, and Bolzano were also attacked by aircraft, but they escaped without damage. Trento reached Taranto in company with the damaged Vittorio Veneto at 15:30 the following day. In the meantime, Pola and two other Zara-class cruisers were destroyed in the night action with British battleships late on the 28th.

==== Convoy operations and loss ====
Trento moved to La Spezia on 6 May for an extensive overhaul that lasted until 5 August, at which point she returned to Messina. She took part in the Duisburg convoy on 8–9 November along with Trieste, the two ships serving as the convoy's covering force. The convoy was attacked by British warships in the early hours of 9 November, though the covering force failed to intervene and the convoy was destroyed. Another convoy followed on 21 November, and during the crossing Trento helped to defend against a British air attack. Less than a month later, on 16 December, Trento joined most of the other heavy units of the fleet to escort two large convoys to Benghazi and Tripoli. The following day, the fleet encountered British forces covering a merchant ship steaming to Malta, leading to the inconclusive First Battle of Sirte. On 22 March 1942, Trento joined the battleship Littorio, the cruisers Gorizia and Giovanni delle Bande Nere, and several destroyers in an attempt to intercept a British convoy. In the Second Battle of Sirte, the four ships attacked Convoy MW10, but the British escorts—four light cruisers and eighteen destroyers—prevented the Italians from attacking the merchant ships. According to some sources, Trento scored a hit on the destroyer HMS Kingston in this action, inflicting heavy damage. Two Italian destroyers, Lanciere and Scirocco, foundered in heavy weather after the battle; Trento attempted to come to their aid, but they sank before she could reach them.

On 14 June, Trento left Taranto with Littorio, Vittorio Veneto, Gorizia, and the light cruisers Giuseppe Garibaldi and Emanuele Filiberto Duca d'Aosta to attack the British convoy from Alexandria steaming to Malta in Operation Harpoon. The following morning, while steaming in the Ionian Sea, a British Bristol Beaufort torpedo-bomber scored a hit on Trento at around 05:00. The torpedo caused a serious fire in the forward boiler rooms, which forced the ship to stop. Some of the escorting destroyers laid a smoke screen to hide the ship from further attacks and tried to tow her back to port, but at 09:10, the British submarine Umbra torpedoed the crippled cruiser. The forward magazines exploded, sinking Trento in a matter of minutes. Her rapid sinking doomed many of her crew, with some 549 men out of a wartime complement of 51 officers and 1,100 enlisted going down with the ship. Among the dead was her commander, Captain Stanislao Esposito. The other Italian warships managed to rescue 602 men, of whom around a third were wounded. Of those, 21 men later died of their wounds. On 18 October 1946, the postwar Italian Navy formally struck Trento from the naval register.
