= Trento-class cruiser =

Heavy cruiser class of the Italian Royal Navy

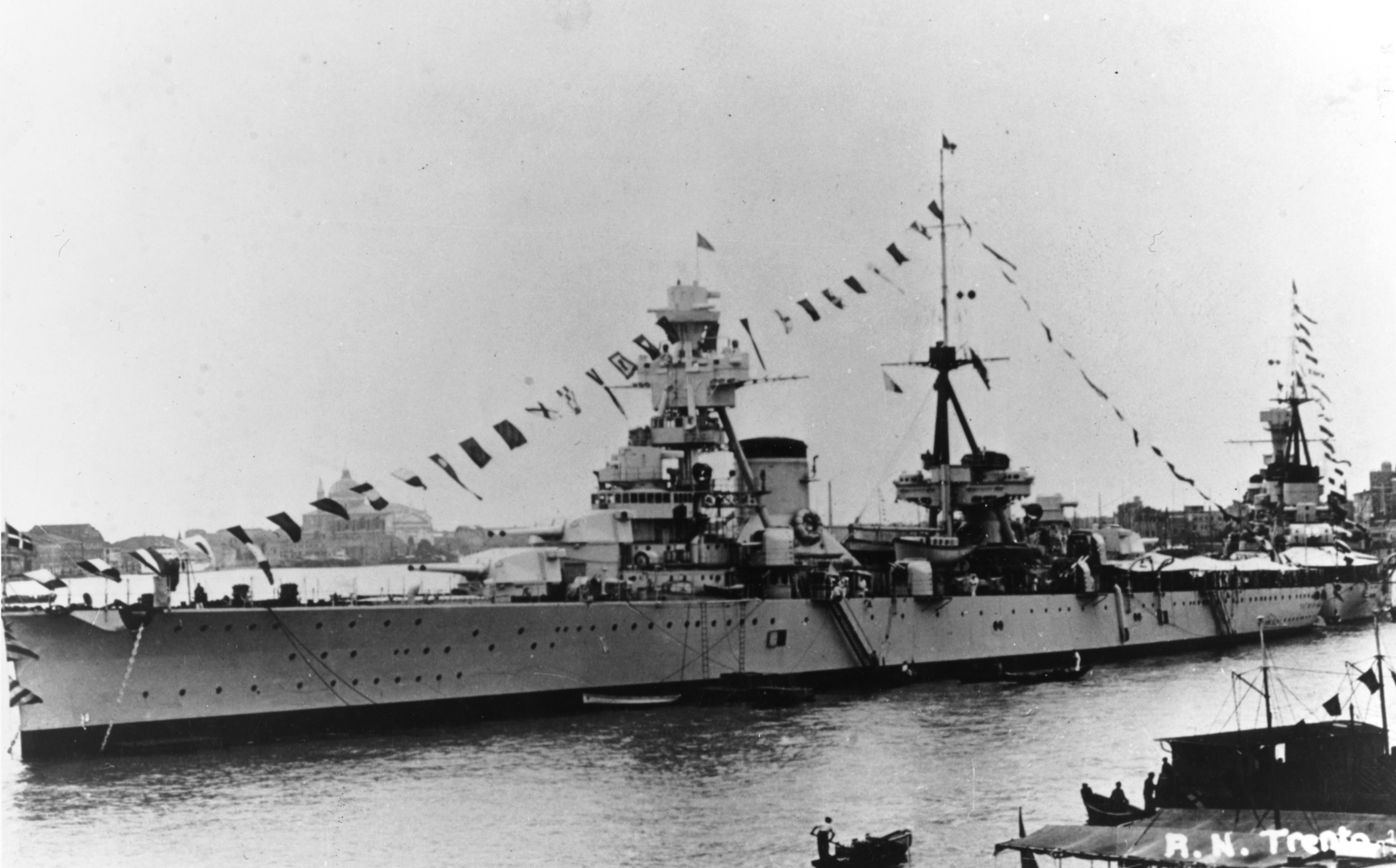
- Trento early in her career

Class overview
- Builders: Cantiere navale fratelli Orlando; Stabilimento Tecnico Triestino
- Operators: Regia Marina
- Preceded by: None
- Succeeded by: Zara class
- Built: 1925–1929
- In commission: 1928–1943
- Completed: 2
- Lost: 2

General characteristics
- Type: Heavy cruiser
- Displacement: Full load: 13,334 long tons (13,548 t)
- Length: 196.96 m (646 ft 2 in) o/a
- Beam: 20.6 m (67 ft 7 in)
- Draft: 6.8 m (22 ft 4 in)
- Installed power: 12 × Yarrow boilers; 150,000 shp (110,000 kW)
- Propulsion: 4 × Parsons steam turbines; 4 × screw propellers
- Speed: Trials: 35.65 kn (66.02 km/h; 41.03 mph); Service: 31 kn (57 km/h; 36 mph)
- Range: 4,160 nmi (7,700 km; 4,790 mi) at 16 kn (30 km/h; 18 mph)
- Complement: Peacetime: 723; Wartime: 781
- Armament: 4 × 2 - 203 mm (8 in) / 50 caliber guns; 8 × 2 - 100 mm (4 in) / 47 caliber guns; 4 × 1 - 40 mm (1.6 in) / 39 caliber anti-aircraft guns (early); 4 × 2 - 37 mm (1 in) / 54 caliber anti-aircraft guns (late); 4 (Trento) or 8 (Trieste) × 1 - 20 mm (0.79 in) / 65 caliber anti-aircraft guns (late); 4 × 2 - 13.2 mm (0.52 in) machine guns (early); 4 × 2 - 533 mm (21 in) torpedo tubes
- Armor: Belt: 70 mm (2.8 in); Deck: 20 to 50 mm (0.79 to 1.97 in) deck; Turrets: 100 mm (3.9 in); Conning tower: 100 mm (3.9 in)
- Aircraft carried: 2 × IMAM Ro.43 seaplanes

The Trento class was a group of two heavy cruisers built for the Italian Regia Marina (Royal Navy) in the late 1920s, the first such vessels built for the Italian fleet. The two ships in the class—Trento and Trieste, were named after the redeemed cities of Trento and Trieste annexed from the Austro-Hungarian empire after the victory in World War I. The ships were very lightly armored, with only a 70 mm (2.8 in) thick armored belt, though they possessed a high speed and heavy main battery of eight 203 mm (8 in) guns. Nominally built under the restrictions of the Washington Naval Treaty, the two cruisers nevertheless exceeded the displacement limits imposed by the treaty.

In the interwar period, the two cruisers served in the Cruiser Division, frequently alternating as the divisional flagship. Trento made two extensive trips abroad, the first was a tour of South American countries in mid to late-1929 and the second was a deployment to China to protect Italian nationals during the Chinese Civil War. In 1938, Trieste assisted in the repatriation of Italian volunteer soldiers who had fought in Spain during the Spanish Civil War. Both ships saw extensive action in World War II, including the battles of Calabria, Cape Spartivento, and Cape Matapan. Trieste was damaged by a British submarine in November 1941 and therefore missed the First and Second Battles of Sirte, where at the latter action Trento damaged a British destroyer.

Trento was torpedoed and sunk by a British torpedo bomber and a submarine in June 1942 with heavy loss of life. In April 1943, Trieste was also sunk in port at La Maddalena during an attack by United States heavy bombers. Salvage operations began in 1950, and after it was determined that the ship's engines had been preserved by leaked fuel oil, the hull was sold to the Spanish Navy, which planned to convert the vessel into a light aircraft carrier. The plan was eventually cancelled in 1956 due to rising costs of the project, and Trieste was broken up for scrap in 1959.

== Design ==
In the early 1920s, the Regia Marina began design studies for cruisers that would adhere to the limitations of the Washington Naval Treaty, which limited cruisers to a displacement of 10,000 long tons (10,160 t) and an armament of 203-millimeter (8 in) guns. The design for what became the Trento class was prepared by General Filippo Bonfiglietti in 1923. In 1924, the French Navy laid down the first of two Duquesne-class cruisers, prompting the Regia Marina to order two vessels to match their rival. The designers emphasized very high speed, which required a significant reduction in armor protection to keep the ships within the displacement limit. In addition, they were designed with a narrow beam to help them reach high speeds, which reduced their stability. This would be the general pattern for Italian cruisers and destroyers built in the 1920s and 1930s, with the exception of the later Zara-class cruisers and some of the later Condottieri-class cruisers.

While the ships were still on the slipways, officers in the Regia Marina expressed concerns that the thin armor protection of the Trentos would leave the vessels poorly equipped for combat. As a result, the navy ordered the more balanced Zara-class, which featured a significantly thicker scale of armor protection. The lightly-built Trento design nevertheless provided the basis for the Veinticinco de Mayo-class cruisers built by Odero Terni Orlando for the Argentine Navy; the Argentine vessels were scaled down slightly, with thinner armor and 190-millimetre (7.5 in) guns. Another derivative design built for the Italian fleet, Bolzano, started construction in 1930 and was commissioned in 1933; though the Bolzano was quite different from the other two vessels, she is sometimes considered a member of the Trento class.

=== General characteristics ===
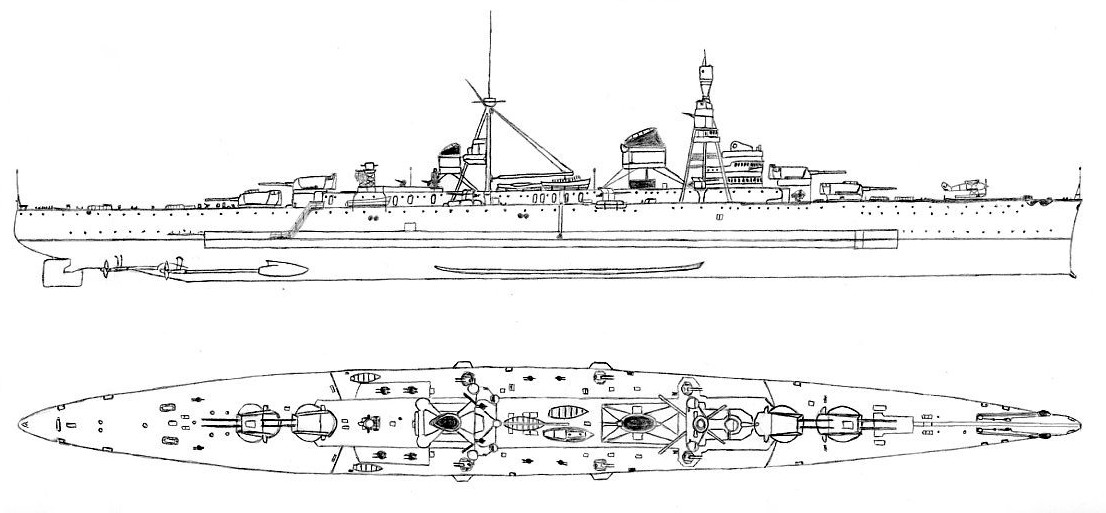
Plan and profile drawing of the Trento class

The ships of the Trento class were 190 meters (623 ft 4 in) long between perpendiculars and 196.96 m (646 ft 2 in) long overall. They had a beam of 20.6 m (67 ft 7 in) and a draft of 6.8 m (22 ft 4 in). They had a design displacement of 10,339 to 10,344 long tons (10,505 to 10,510 t) and they displaced up to 13,334 long tons (13,548 t) at full load, though their displacement was nominally within the 10,000-long-ton restriction set in place by the Washington Naval Treaty. Their hulls had a flush deck and a bulbous bow, the first time the latter feature was employed on an Italian warship. The ships were completed with a pair of tripod masts, though on trials they were found to vibrate excessively, and the foremast was strengthened with two extra legs. They had a crew of 723 officers and enlisted men, though during the war this increased to 781. They carried a pair of IMAM Ro.43 seaplanes for aerial reconnaissance; the hangar was located under the forecastle and a fixed catapult was mounted on the centerline at the bow.

The Trento-class cruisers' power plant consisted of four Parsons steam turbines powered by twelve oil-fired Yarrow boilers, which were trunked into two funnels amidships. The boilers were divided into three boiler rooms with four each; two powered the forward engines that drove the outboard propellers and the remaining four were allocated to the turbines that drove the center shafts. The engines were rated at 150,000 shaft horsepower (110,000 kW) for a top speed of 36 knots (67 km/h; 41 mph), with projected service performance of 120,000 shp (89,000 kW) for 34 knots (63 km/h; 39 mph) at normal displacement. On sea trials, Trieste only reached 35.65 knots (66.02 km/h; 41.03 mph) and Trento managed slightly less than that; these speeds could only be reached on a very light displacement, and in service, her practical top speed was only 31 knots (57 km/h; 36 mph). The ships had a storage capacity of 2,214 metric tons (2,179 long tons; 2,441 short tons) of fuel oil, which provided a cruising range of 4,160 nautical miles (7,700 km; 4,790 mi) at a speed of 16 knots (30 km/h; 18 mph). During refits in early 1940, funnel caps were added to reduce smoke interference with the masts.

=== Armament and armor ===
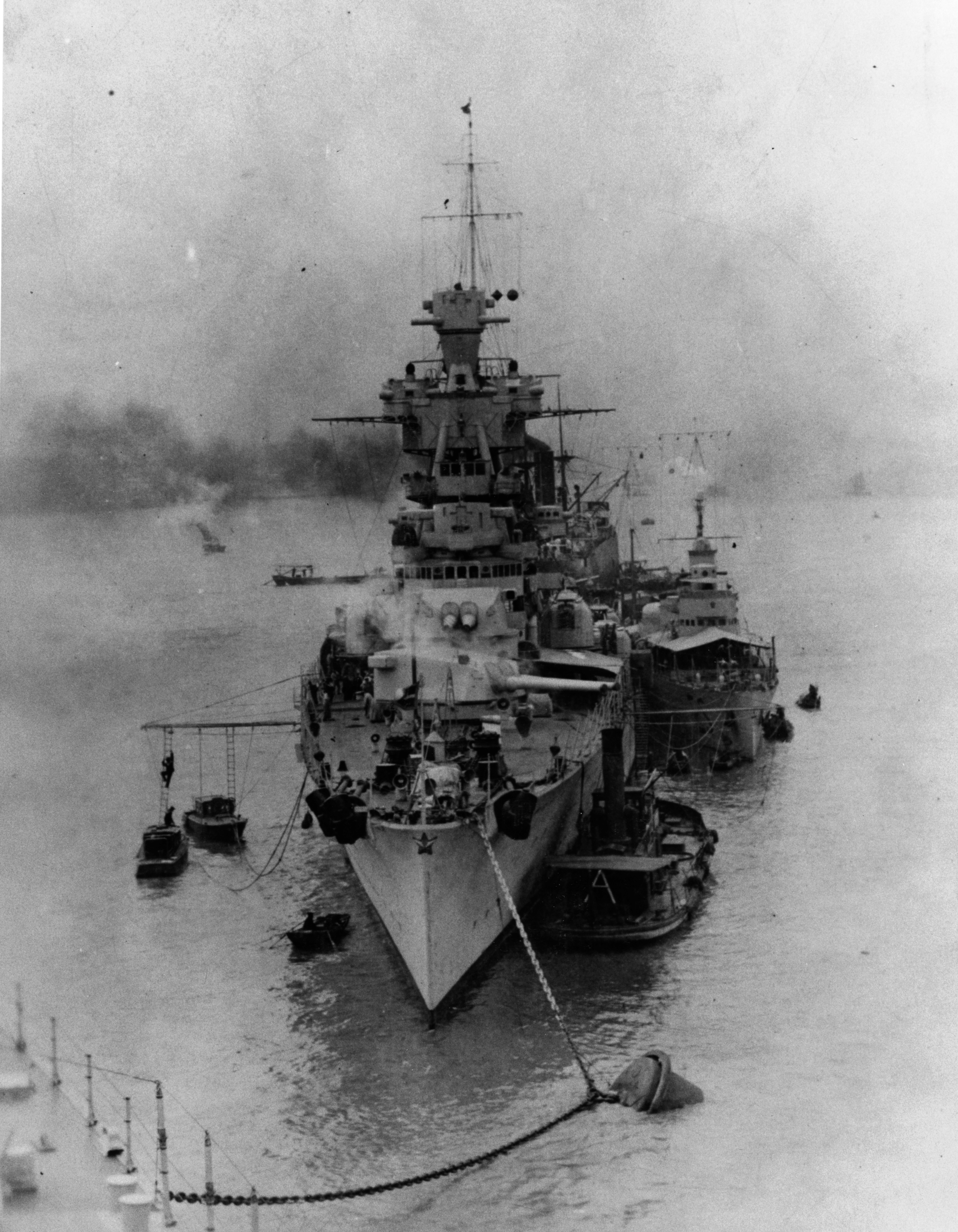
Bow view of Trento; note the very close mounting of the turret guns

Trento and Trieste were armed with a main battery of eight 203 mm (8 in) Mod 24 50-caliber guns in four gun turrets; each turret carried the guns in a single cradle rather than independent mounts. The turrets were arranged in superfiring pairs forward and aft, and allowed for elevation to 45 degrees, for a maximum range of 27,000 meters (30,000 yd). They had a rate of fire of three rounds per minute, and the guns had to reset to 15 degrees to reload. The turrets were electrically operated, including the training and elevation gear and the ammunition hoists. The guns suffered from excessive shell dispersion, like many other Italian guns of the period. Initially supplied with 125-kilogram (276 lb) shells fired at a muzzle velocity of 905 meters per second (2,970 ft/s), the shells and propellant charges were reduced—to 118 kg (260 lb) at 840 m/s (2,800 ft/s)—in an unsuccessful attempt to tighten shell grouping. The problem was in large part due to poor quality control in Italian munition factories, which failed to ensure tight manufacturing tolerances necessary for accurate shells. In addition, the single cradle mounts required the guns to be very close together; this caused the shells to interfere with each other in flight and contributed to the dispersion problem. Fire control was provided by a pair of Barr & Stroud 5 m (16 ft) coincidence rangefinders.

Anti-aircraft defense was provided by a battery of sixteen 100 mm (4 in) 47-cal. guns in twin mounts, four Vickers-Terni 40 mm/39 guns in single mounts and four 12.7 mm (0.50 in) machine guns. The 100 mm guns were copies of Austro-Hungarian guns designed in 1910 by Škoda that were placed in newly designed dual-purpose mounts that elevated to 85 degrees for a maximum range of 15,240 m (50,000 ft). In addition to the gun armament, they carried eight 533 mm (21 in) torpedo tubes in four deck mounted twin launchers. The ships' secondary batteries were revised several times during their careers. Both ships had their 100 mm guns replaced with newer Mod 31 versions of the same caliber. In 1937–1938, the two aft-most 100 mm guns were removed, along with all four 12.7 mm machine guns; eight 37 mm (1.5 in) 54-cal. Breda M1932 guns and eight 13.2 mm (0.52 in) Breda M1931 machine guns, all in twin mounts, were installed in their place. In 1942, Trento received four 20 mm (0.79 in) 65-cal. Breda M1940 guns in single mounts, with Trieste receiving eight of those guns the following year.

Both vessels were protected with an armored citadel that covered the ships' vitals, including the machinery spaces and ammunition magazines. The vertical armor belt was 70 mm (2.8 in) thick and ran from 8 m (26 ft) forward of the fore main battery turrets to 5 m (16 ft) aft of the rear turrets. Either end of the belt was capped with armored bulkheads 60 mm (2.4 in) thick on the upper portion; the forward bulkhead had a lower section that was reduced to 50 mm (2 in), and the aft bulkhead's lower portion was reduced to 40 mm (1.6 in). Their armor deck was 50 mm thick in the central portion of the ship and reduced to 20 mm (0.79 in) aft, with 30 mm (1.2 in) thick sloped sides. The armor deck did not extend forward of the citadel. The gun turrets had 100 mm (3.9 in) thick plating on the faces and the supporting barbettes they sat in were 70 mm thick above the armor deck and 60 mm thick below. The main conning tower had 100 mm thick sides and a 50 mm thick roof; above the tower was a fire control director with 80 mm (3.1 in) thick sides and a 60 mm thick roof.

== Ships ==
Construction data
Name	Builder	Laid down	Launched	Completed
Trento	Cantiere navale fratelli Orlando	8 February 1925	4 October 1927	3 April 1929
Trieste	Stabilimento Tecnico Triestino	22 June 1925	20 October 1926	21 December 1928

== Service history ==
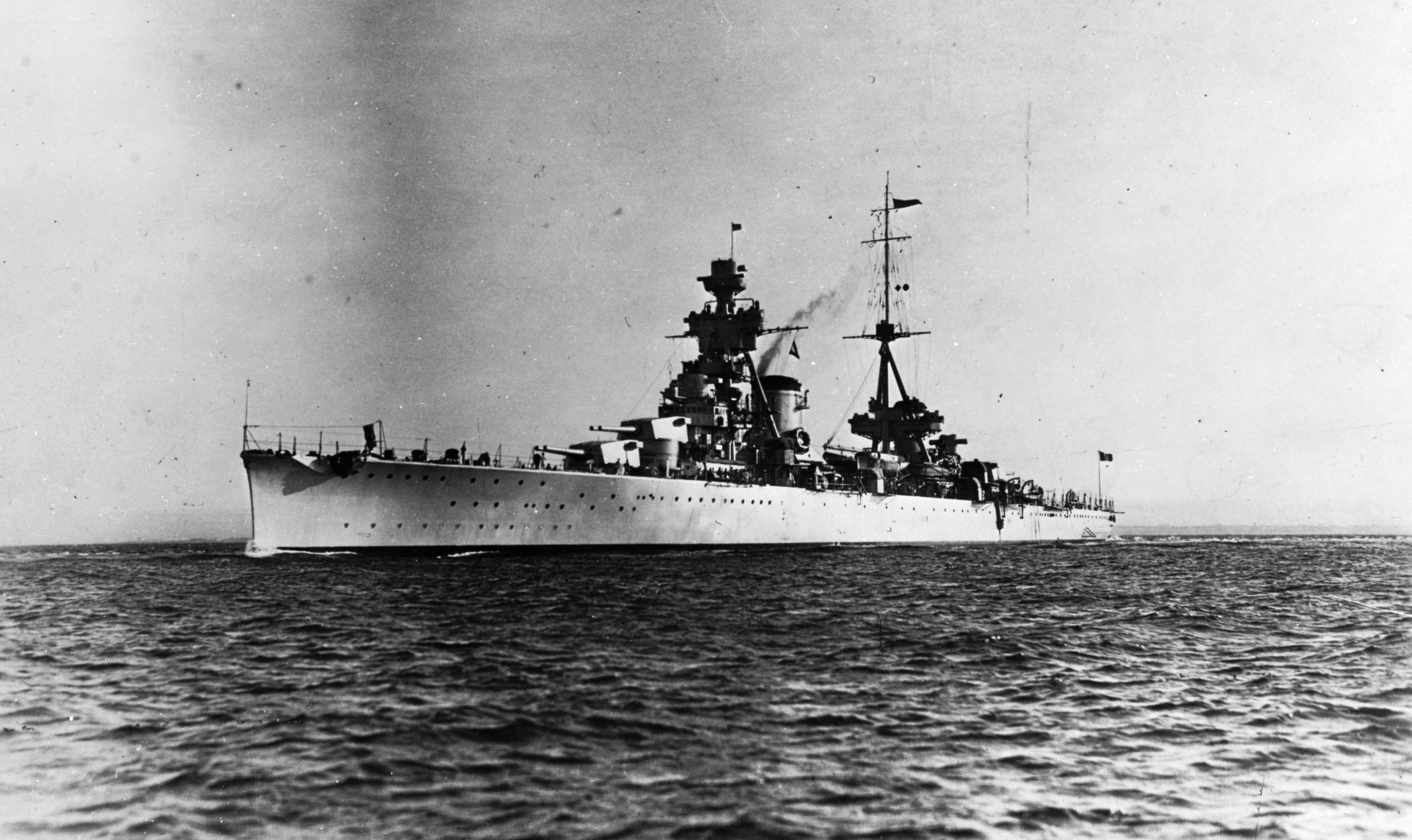
Trieste in 1930

Trento and Trieste were named for the two largest unredeemed cities taken from Austria-Hungary in the aftermath of World War I. They frequently served as the flagship of the Cruiser Division throughout the 1930s. During the pre-war period, Trento made lengthy trips abroad, including a tour of South America from May to October 1929 and a deployment to China from January to June 1932 to protect Italian nationals during the Chinese Civil War. Both vessels took part in numerous naval reviews held for visiting foreign leaders in the 1930s, including Adolf Hitler of Nazi Germany and Miklós Horthy, the Regent of Hungary. In 1938 Trieste helped transport soldiers of the Corpo Truppe Volontarie (Corps of Volunteer Troops), which had been sent to Spain to fight in the Spanish Civil War, back to Italy.

After Italy entered World War II in June 1940, Trento and Trieste saw extensive action against British forces in the Mediterranean Sea, including at the battles of Calabria, Cape Spartivento, and Cape Matapan in July and November 1940 and March 1941, respectively. Trento was present at Calabria, where she battled British cruisers but did not sustain any damage. At the Battle of Cape Spartivento, either Trento or Trieste scored a hit on the British cruiser HMS Berwick, and Trieste was briefly engaged but not seriously damaged by the battlecruiser HMS Renown. At Cape Matapan, the two cruisers engaged several British cruisers at very long range, with neither side scoring any hits.

In November 1941, Trieste was torpedoed by the submarine HMS Utmost; she spent most of the next year under repair. In the meantime, Trento was also present during the inconclusive First and Second Battles of Sirte, and at the latter she severely damaged a British destroyer. Both cruisers were also frequently tasked with escorting convoys to supply Italian forces in North Africa as well as interdicting British convoys to the island of Malta in the central Mediterranean. During one of the latter missions to attack the British Operation Harpoon convoy in June 1942, Trento was torpedoed twice, first by a Bristol Beaufighter torpedo bomber and then sunk by the submarine HMS Umbra with very heavy loss of life on 15 June; out of a wartime complement of 51 officers and 1,100 enlisted men, 549 were killed in the sinking, and a further 21 later died of wounds.

Trieste returned to action in August 1942 for an operation that was cancelled following the torpedoing of another Italian cruiser by a British submarine. Trieste was moved to La Maddalena, Sardinia, where she was later sunk by United States heavy bombers on 10 April 1943. Salvage work on Trieste began in 1950. Her superstructure was cut away and she was refloated and towed to La Spezia; an inspection revealed that fuel oil had leaked into the machinery spaces, protecting them while the ship had been submerged. The Spanish Navy purchased the hull in 1952 and had her towed to Ferrol, with plans to convert the vessel into a light aircraft carrier. The project ultimately came to nothing due to the growing costs of the project, forcing its cancellation in 1956. She was ultimately broken up by 1959.
