= HMS Umbra =

Submarine of the Royal Navy

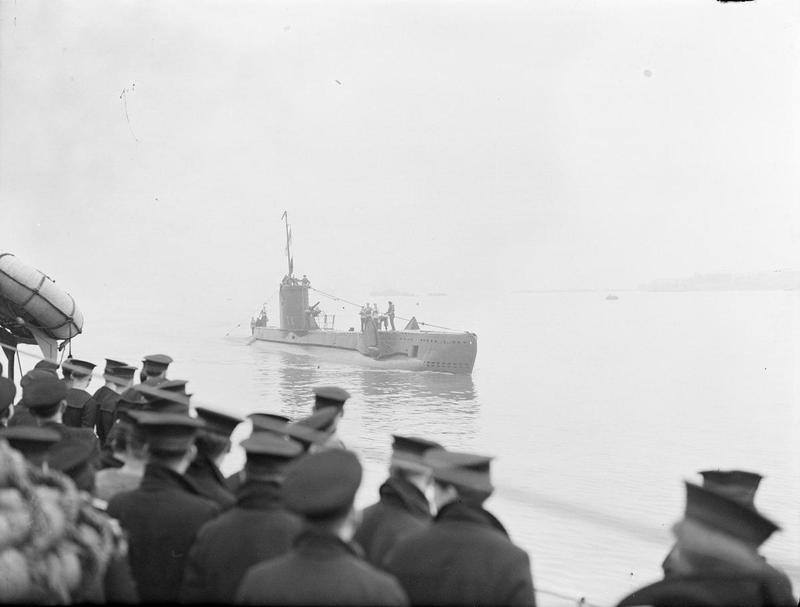
- HMS Umbra

History

United Kingdom
- Name: HMS Umbra
- Builder: Vickers Armstrong, Barrow-in-Furness
- Laid down: 19 July 1940
- Launched: 15 March 1941
- Commissioned: 2 September 1941
- Fate: Sold for scrap on 9 July 1946, broken up at Blyth

General characteristics
- Class & type: U-class submarine
- Displacement: Surfaced - 540 tons standard, 630 tons full load; Submerged - 730 tons
- Length: 58.22 m (191 feet)
- Beam: 4.90 m (16 ft 1 in)
- Draught: 4.62 m (15 ft 2 in)
- Propulsion: 2 shaft diesel-electric; 2 Paxman Ricardo diesel generators + electric motors; 615 / 825 hp
- Speed: 11.25 knots max surfaced; 10 knots max submerged
- Complement: 27-31
- Armament: 4 bow internal 21 inch (533 mm) torpedo tubes - 8 - 10 torpedoes; 1 - 3-inch (76 mm) gun

HMS Umbra (P35) was a Royal Navy U-class submarine built by Vickers-Armstrongs at Barrow-in-Furness. So far she has been the only ship of the Royal Navy to bear the name Umbra.

== Career ==
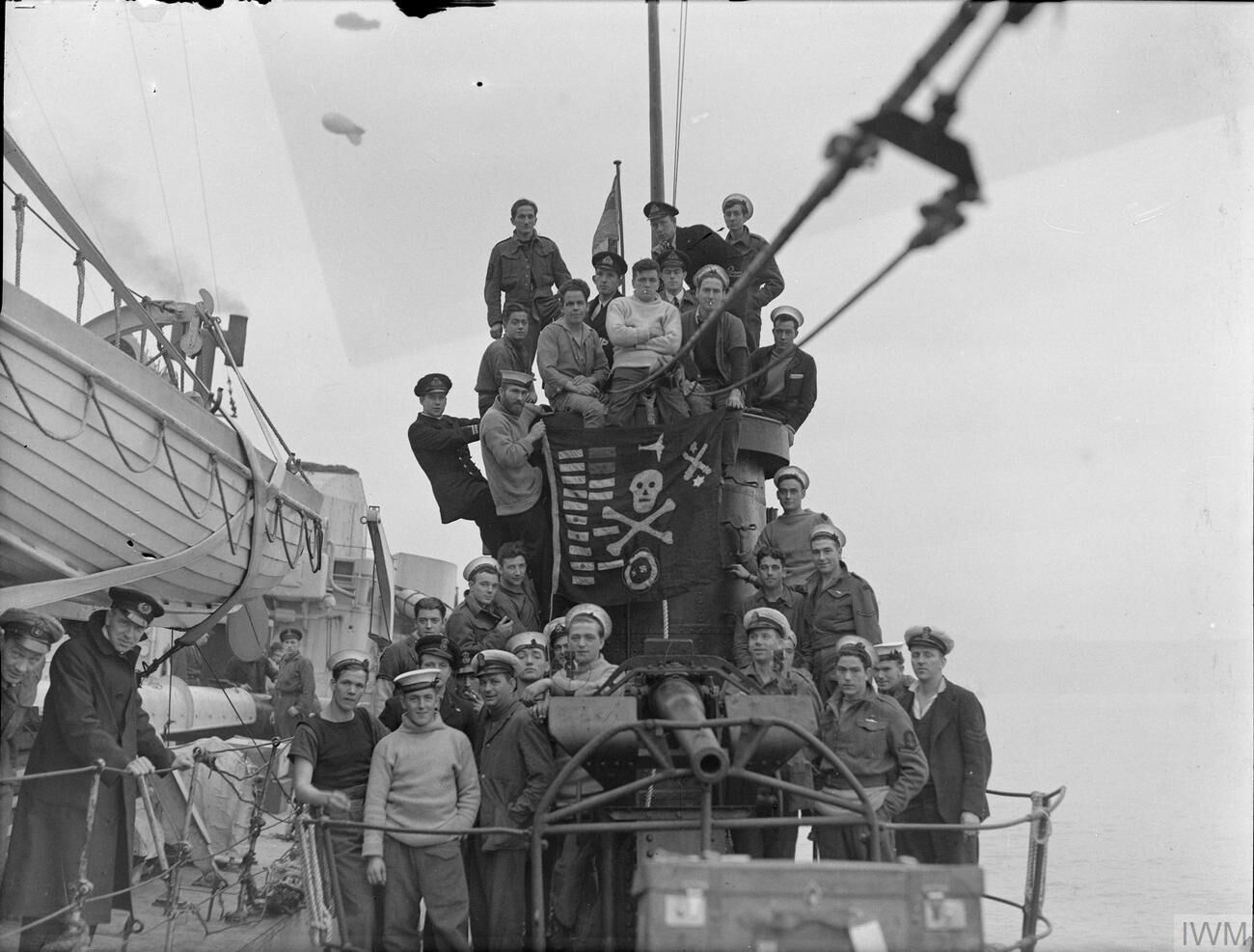
HMS Umbra's crew displaying the Jolly Roger

She spent most of the war in the Mediterranean, where she sank the Italian cargo ships Assunta De Gregori, Francesco Barbaro, Sacro Cuore, Emilio Morandi, the Italian transport ship Manfredo Campiero, and the German cargo ship Süllberg. She also sank the Italian salvage vessel Rampino, and picked up her sole survivor, and torpedoed and sank the damaged Italian cruiser Trento on 15 June 1942. Trento had already been damaged by a torpedo from a British Beaufort aircraft (No. 217 Squadron RAF based at Malta). She also attacked the Italian battleship Littorio, but her torpedoes missed their target.

Umbra also torpedoed and destroyed the grounded Italian supply ship Amsterdam on 23 October 1942, and sank the Italian tug Pronta that was trying to salvage the Amsterdam. The Amsterdam had been grounded after being hit by a torpedo in an air attack. Umbra also damaged the 15,186 GRT Italian troop ship Piemonte and the Italian cargo ship Napoli. The ship was beached and later destroyed by aircraft. She later attacked and damaged the German troop ship Macedonia north of Sousse, Tunisia. The damaged German ship was beached and abandoned. She also launched an attack on the Italian cargo ship Nino Bixio, but missed her.

One of her last actions was to attack the Italian sailing vessels Nuovo Domenico and Concetta Falco by gunfire in the Gulf of Hammamet on 11 January 1943. Nuovo Domenico was damaged in the attack.

She survived the war, was sold for scrap on 9 July 1946, and was broken up at Blyth.
