= Vincenzo Cersosimo =

Examining magistrate of the Special Tribunal for the Defense of the State
- In office 1 August 1931 – 25 July 1943
- In office 3 December 1943 – April 1945

Personal details
- Born: 1900 Cassano all'Ionio, Kingdom of Italy
- Died: 1969 (aged 69) Ausonia, Italy
- Party: National Fascist Party; Republican Fascist Party
- Occupation: Judge

Vincenzo Cersosimo (Cassano all'Ionio, 1900 – Ausonia, 1969) was an Italian judge during the Fascist regime. A member of the Special Tribunal for the Defense of the State both in the Kingdom of Italy and the Italian Social Republic, he is best known for his role as examining magistrate in the Verona Trial and the Admirals' Trial of 1944.

== Biography ==
Born in Calabria, Cersosimo joined the Blackshirts in 1921, participating in the March on Rome. After graduating in law, he became a member of the Special Tribunal for the Defense of the State on 1 August 1931, gaining a reputation as a skilled inquisitory judge.

After the fall of the Fascist regime on 25 July 1943 and the dissolution of the Special Tribunal, he was entrusted with the task of transferring its files to the archives of the Military Tribunal. In October 1943 he joined the Italian Social Republic, becoming once again a member of the Special Tribunal for the Defense of the State when this was re-established on 3 December 1943.

In early 1944 he was appointed as investigating judge and tasked with collecting the evidence to set up the Verona trial against the members of the Grand Council of Fascism who had voted the order of the day that had resulted in the fall of the regime on 25 July 1943: former Foreign Minister Galeazzo Ciano, Marshal of Italy Emilio De Bono, Minister of Agriculture Carlo Pareschi, Minister of Corporations Tullio Cianetti, State Undersecretary for Communications Giovanni Marinelli, and trade unionist Luciano Gottardi, as well as others who had become fugitives. As the minutes of the 25 July session of the Grand Council of Fascism had been lost, Cersosimo had to piece together the events based on newspaper articles and the statements of the defendants, whom he interrogated in prison. When he tried to interrogate Galeazzo Ciano in the Scalzi prison in Verona, Cersosimo was stopped by the German guards, but was later able to carry out his task after the intercession of Hilde Purwin. The trial was held in Verona and lasted three days, from 8 to 10 February 1944; all defendants were sentenced to death with the exception of Cianetti, sentenced to thirty years’ imprisonment. Ciano, De Bono, Gottardi, Pareschi and Marinelli were executed by firing squad on 11 February 1944.

Cersosimo later organized the so-called Admirals' Trial against Admirals Inigo Campioni and Luigi Mascherpa, accused of treason by the Italian Social Republic for having resisted the German takeover in the Dodecanese after the Armistice of Cassibile. This was for all intents and purposes a show trial, as Campioni and Mascherpa had merely obeyed the orders of the legitimate government, having sworn loyalty to the King like all members of the Italian armed forces, and had never made an oath of allegiance towards the Italian Social Republic, that did not even exist at the time of the events involving Campioni; Mussolini and the Fascist hardliners wanted to take revenge on the Royal Italian Navy, perceived as the "least fascistized" of the Italian armed forces, which had entirely obeyed the orders of the royalist government after the Armistice. The trial was held in Parma and lasted only one day, 22 May 1944; both admirals were sentenced to death and executed by firing squad two days later. Admirals Gino Pavesi and Priamo Leonardi were also sentenced to death in absentia, for the fall of Pantelleria and Augusta in the summer of 1943.

Cersosimo was arrested after the war, but released as a result of the Togliatti amnesty in 1946. In 1949 he published a book with his personal account of the Verona trial. He died in Ausonia in 1969.

His son Manlio Cersosimo became a famous porn actor during the 1980s.
