= Admirals' Trial =

The Admirals' Trial (Italian: processo degli ammiragli) was a show trial held in May 1944 by the Special Tribunal for the Defense of the State of the Italian Social Republic against a group of admirals of the Regia Marina, accused of treason by the Italian Social Republic for their behaviour in the summer of 1943 and after the Armistice of Cassibile.

== Background ==
During the interwar period, the Royal Italian Navy was considered as the "least fascistized" of the Italian Armed Forces, with most officers being staunchly loyal to the monarchy. This was confirmed by the behaviour of the Navy after the proclamation of the armistice of Cassibile on 8 September 1943; while many Army commanders hesitated or negotiated with the Germans, enabling them to swiftly occupy most of Italy, the Navy unanimously carried out the armistice orders, sailing all seaworthy vessels into Allied-controlled ports and scuttling or sabotaging all ships that were unable to sail. Naval garrisons were often at the forefront in resisting the German takeover in the Balkans and the Aegean islands, and few senior Italian naval officers joined the Italian Social Republic.

Before the armistice, suspects about "traitors" in the naval staff were aroused by the interception of many supply convoys bound for North Africa, which occurred with such precision that it seemed as if the Allies knew about their time schedule. This was due to Ultra intercepts, but the existence of ULTRA was kept secret until the 1970s, and at the time many therefore inferred that traitors within Supermarina were passing information to the enemy.

Fascist leaders blamed the higher ranks of the armed forces, and especially of the Navy, for the failures in the war against the Allies; after the establishment of the Italian Social Republic, Fascist propaganda sought to use them as scapegoats, claiming that they had betrayed the Duce, the regime and the country by deliberately sabotaging the war effort, as was "proven" by their compliance with the orders of the Badoglio government, which had "betrayed" the German ally, surrendered to the Allies and allowed them to occupy southern Italy.

== The defendants ==
Six admirals were put on trial:

- Fleet Admiral Inigo Campioni, former Governor of the Dodecanese;
- Vice Admiral Gino Pavesi, former commander of the Pantelleria Naval Area;
- Vice Admiral Pellegrino Matteucci, former commander of the Toulon Naval Fortress Area and of Italian naval forces in southern France;
- Rear Admiral Priamo Leonardi, former commander of the Augusta-Syracuse Naval Fortress Area;
- Rear Admiral Luigi Mascherpa, former military commander of Leros and commander of all Italian naval forces in the Dodecanese after the fall of Rhodes;
- Rear Admiral Franco Zannoni, former commander of the Venice Naval Fortress Area.

Pavesi was accused of surrendering the island fortress of Pantelleria to the Allies in June 1943, despite having the means to resist (Pantelleria had surrendered shortly before a British landing, after a month of heavy aerial and naval bombardment). Leonardi was accused of surrendering the heavily defended naval fortress area of Augusta and Syracuse without fighting, during the Allied invasion of Sicily (in reality, the defence of Augusta had collapsed due to the weakness of the inland defences and the mass desertion of the MILMART personnel, and Leonardi had tried to mount a defense with the few troops that were still available and even personally fired on British ships from a deserted coastal battery). Campioni, Mascherpa, Matteucci and Zannoni were accused of obeying the "traitorous" Badoglio government and resisting the Germans after the armistice of Cassibile on 8 September 1943. This accusation was entirely baseless, as the admirals, like all Italian servicemen, were bound by their oath of loyalty towards the King and therefore the Badoglio government, which had been appointed by him, while they had sworn no oath towards the Duce (who had been deposed on 25 July 1943 and was imprisoned at the time of the armistice) or the Italian Social Republic (which did not even exist at the time of the events for which Campioni, Zannoni and Matteucci were accused, having been established on 23 September 1943).

Pavesi and Leonardi, who were in British captivity at the time, were tried in absentia, whereas Campioni, Mascherpa, Zannoni and Matteucci, who were in German captivity (Campioni, Mascherpa and Zannoni in Oflag 64/Z in Schokken, Matteucci in Vittel), were handed over by Germany at the request of the Italian Social Republic.

== The trial ==
Charges against admirals Zannoni and Matteucci were dropped at the end of the preliminary investigation, on 12 May 1944, as it was established that Venice and Toulon had been occupied by the Germans without any bloodshed, since the two admirals had judged armed resistance to be futile and negotiated their surrender, and thus the accusation of fighting against the Germans was void. Fighting in Rhodes under Campioni, instead, had lasted three days, and Mascherpa had led the resistance of Leros for over two and a half months during the battle of Leros, therefore the trial against them proceeded, as did for the absent Pavesi and Leonardi.

The trial began and ended on the same day, 22 May 1944. Vincenzo Cersosimo, who had already been the investigating judge for the Verona Trial, was again appointed as examining magistrate. The investigation was carried out hastily and almost without looking for evidence; lawyer Gustavo Ghidini, who defended Campioni, complained that the trial "in reality does not exist: it absolutely lacks a legal basis, it is illogical, absurd", and lawyer Paolo Toffanin, who defended Mascherpa, demonstrated that the admiral could not have abstained from carrying out the orders received from the Supreme Command, later confirmed by Campioni, to whom he was directly subordinated; he was a sailor who had been serving for two years on the remote island of Leros, unaware of all the political troubles of the capital, and as such he had to obey the orders of the king and the governments in office. The Public Prosecutor, Amodeo Gibilaro, vigorously intervened against Toffanin, suggesting to the Court the possibility of his indictment for public apology of a crime.

Unlike the Verona trial, which had been carried out in the presence of the public, the Admirals' trial took place in a virtually deserted courtroom; there were no journalists or photographers, and even the relatives of the accused were forced to wait outside. The palace was guarded by the soldiers of the Republican National Guard, armed with machine guns. Campioni was the first to be questioned and his intervention lasted an hour and a half, while Mascherpa's was much shorter. The defense had summoned ten witnesses, but only three showed up in the courtroom; the lawyers then asked for the trial to be postponed, but the president, Blackshirt General Giuseppe Griffini, replied that he did not see the reason and immediately gave the floor to the Public Prosecutor, who began his indictment. Gibilaro asked for the death penalty for all four defendants. The trial ended at 7 pm, after which the court withdrew; after only a quarter of an hour in the council chamber, the president of the court pronounced the death sentence for all four admirals. Campioni and Mascherpa, together with the absent Pavesi and Leonardi, were sentenced to be shot in the chest "according to article 103 of the Military Criminal Code of War".

The execution took place two days later, at dawn on 24 May 1944, at the Parma shooting range. Mussolini, who had personally pressured for a death sentence, refused any act of clemency and openly regretted not having been able to execute Pavesi and Leonardi as well. After the war, Campioni and Mascherpa were posthumously awarded the Gold Medal of Military Valor.

== See also ==
- Verona trial
