= Invasion of Elba =

WWII Italian military campaign

- Part of the Italian campaign of World War II
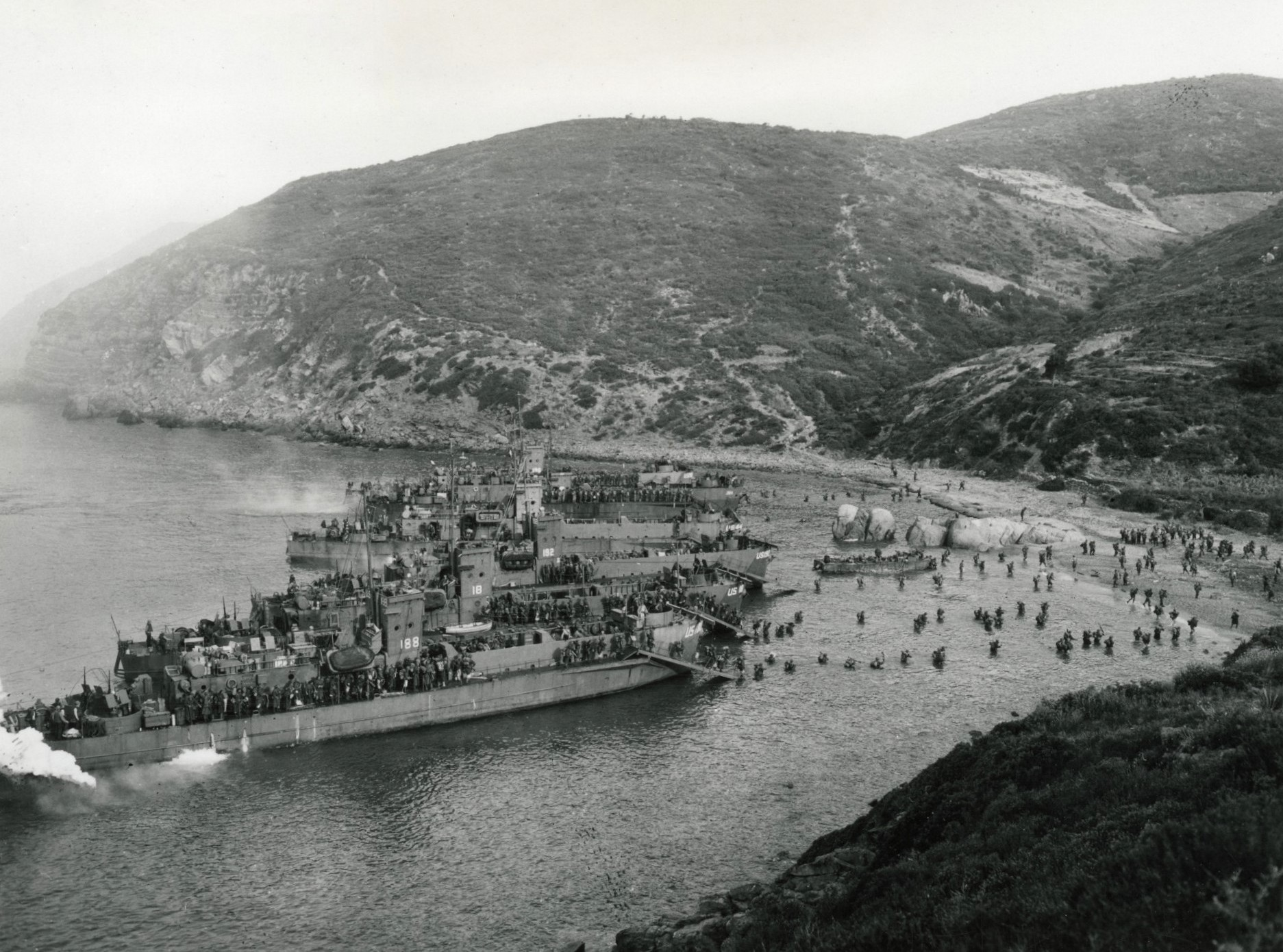
- French troops landing on Elba, 17 June 1944
Date	17–19 June 1944
Location	Elba, Italy
Result	Allied victory

Belligerents
France; United Kingdom; United States	Germany

Commanders and leaders
Jean de Tassigny; Thomas Troubridge	Franz Gall

Units involved
Force 255; 9th Colonial Infantry Division; Bataillon de Choc Commando; 2nd Groupe de Tabors Marocains; British; Force N; Royal Naval Commandos; 26 Vickers Wellingtons; United States; 87th Fighter Wing; 57th Bombardment Wing	2 infantry battalions

Casualties and losses
British; 38 killed; 9 wounded; French; 252 killed; 635 wounded	500 killed; 1,995 captured; flak ship destroyed

The invasion of Elba, codenamed Operation Brassard, was part of the Italian campaign during the Second World War. The invasion was carried out from 17 to 19 June 1944 by the French Liberation Army supported by British and American ships and aircraft. According to the testimony of captured Germans, Allied activity had been observed on Corsica, thus the defenders were aware of the impending invasion 24 hours in advance. They resisted for two days before being given permission to withdraw to the mainland.

== Background ==
=== Elba ===
The Island of Elba is 6.2 mi (10 km) from the Italian mainland, opposite the coastal town of Piombino in Tuscany. The island is the third largest Italian island after Sicily and Sardinia and the largest of the Tuscan Archipelago. The island is 19 mi (30 km) long and varies from 11 mi (18 km) wide at the east and west ends to 2.5 mi (4 km) in the middle, The island is dry and mountainous, Monte Capanne, the highest point at 3,343 ft (1,019 m), is in the west and the coast has steep cliffs with deep semicircular bays. The population, about 30,000 in 1939, consisted of 12,000 people living in Portoferraio, the main harbour and 3,000 at Marciana, both on the north shore, the rest living in the sparsely populated interior.

=== Italian armistice ===
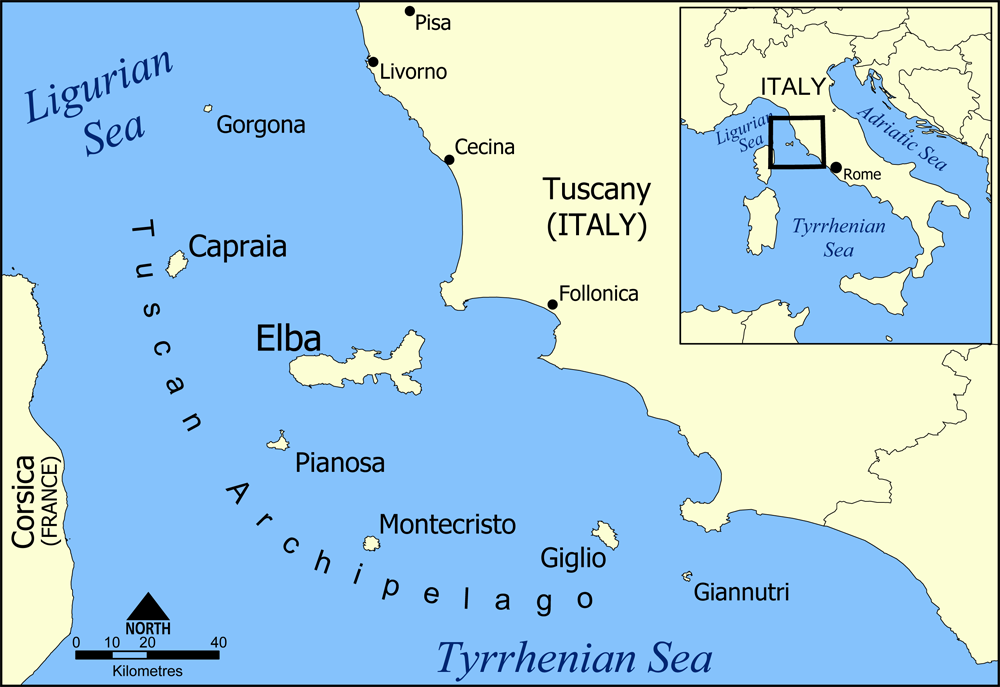
Map of the Tuscan Archipelago

When the armistice was announced on 8 September, the defence of the Tuscan coast near Elba was the responsibility of the II Corpo d'Amata (II Corps, Lieutenant-General Vittorio Sogno to 4 September 1943 then Lieutenant-General Gervasio Bitossi to 9 September) with its headquarters at Florence. The 215ª Divisione Costiera, had been formed on 1 August, with three regiments to defend the coast from Cecina and Orbetello and the Tuscan Archipelago. The 108th Reggimento Costiero (Colonnello Nicola De Stefanis) garrisoned the island with four fusilier battalions and two machine-gun battalions. There were four groups of artillery and one anti-aircraft battery on the island and nine navy coastal batteries. The military commander of the island, Generale di Brigata Achilles Gilardi, had a garrison of 8,300 men comprising 6,300 army and 2,000 navy personnel with about fifty Germans, mostly radar operators.

After the Allied invasions of Sicily, and the mainland, the Germans decided to evacuate the 90th Panzergrenadier Division from Sardinia and the Sturmbrigade Reichsführer-SS from Corsica, along with four fortress battalions and naval and air units on the islands, lest they be trapped by the Allies. Some Italian military units defected to the Allies and others, like a battalion of the 184th Infantry Division "Nembo" stayed loyal to the Axis; control of Elba was necessary for the evacuations. On 9 September, Gilardi was ordered "to act with force against acts of force committed by the Germans". The Italian Navy directed all ships in Tyrrhenian ports to sail to prevent them from falling into German hands, many of the ships heading for Portoferraio, including seven corvettes, 11 torpedo boats, four submarines and many smaller ships. Late on 9 September, Germans began to commandeer ships in Piombino, disarming the crews and Italian soldiers nearby; an Italian coastal battery opened fire, forcing the Germans to release the men and return the ships.

On the morning of 10 September, amidst the confusion, Italian army gunners mistook four Italian submarine chasers entering the Golfo di Procchio for Germans ships and opened fire on them. The ships withdrew and made for Piombino in bad weather. At noon, ships were seen approaching Portoferraio from the north-east. The corvettes Folaga, Ape and Cormorano sailed and engaged five German armed lighters, forcing them to turn back. In the afternoon reports were received from Piombino that many German ships had assembled in the harbour, including two torpedo boats, a minesweeper and twelve lighters and that the Germans were landing troops to cut the roads near the port. In the evening, the Italian authorities at Piombino requested help from the ships in Portoferraio but Ammiraglio Amedeo Nomis di Pollone, reported that nothing could be done until dawn.

=== German invasion ===
On 11 September, Gilardi was ordered to negotiate with German commanders but refused, claiming that the order was contrary to the proclamation by the King. German aircraft flew over the island dropping leaflets which denounced the Badoglio government and gave an ultimatum Gilardi to surrender before 4:00 p. m. or the garrison would be annihilated by bombing; troops that fought on would be treated as terrorists and shot. The navy had ordered all its ships to sail for Palermo in Sicily and those seaworthy in Portoferraio complied. During the night, the German occupied Piombino on the mainland; on the night of 12/13 September, the coastal guns on Elba batteries fired on small boats approaching south of Porto Longone (now Porto Azzurro) on the east coast, that turned back. More approaches were attempted on the nights of 13/14, 14/15 September. Early on 15 September, a staff officer from II Corpo di Armata, with two German officers landed at Scoglietto, near Portoferraio, with a letter ordering Gilardi to surrender, which he rejected. The Germans tried to land on the islet of Palmaiola, at the north-eastern extremity of Elba but were forced back by the coastal artillery at Cannelle on Giglio Island. On 16 September, ten Luftwaffe bombers attacked Portoferraio, causing about 100 military and civilian deaths, with 150 injuries, far beyond the medical facilities on the island to cope. There was much damage and the anti-aircraft battery at Le Grotte, across the bay from Portoferraio, was damaged. Gilardi tried to open negotiations but a German invasion force was on the way from Livorno.

==== Unternehmen Goldfasan ====
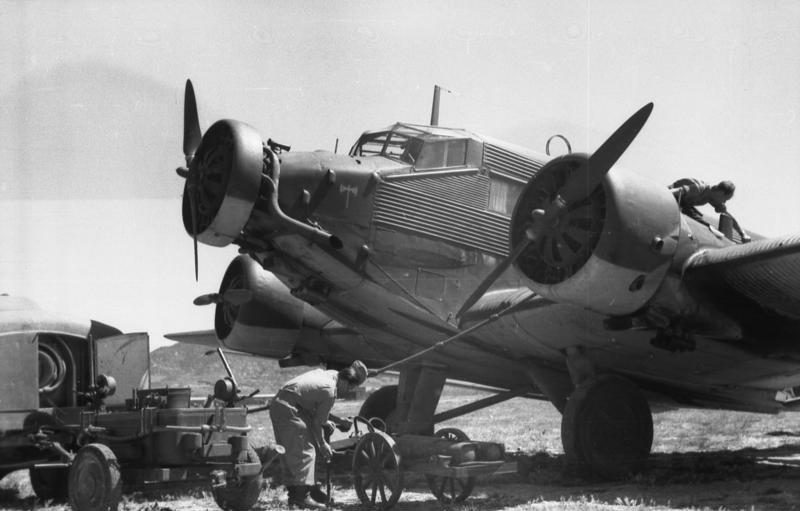
Example of a Junkers Ju 52 photographed in 1943

Luftwaffe Junkers Ju 52 (Ju 52) aircraft of II. Gruppe/Transportgeschwader 1 were ready for Unternehmen Goldfasan (Operation Golden Pheasant) at Ciampino airfield near Rome. (Note: II. Gruppe had transferred from southern France on 11 July and then ferried parts of the 2. Fallschirmjäger Division (2nd Parachute Division) from southern France during August.) Early on 17 September, the Ju52s flew about 600 paratroopers from III. Bataillon Fallschirmjäger Regiment 7 (3rd Battalion, Parachute Regiment 7, Major Friedrich Hübner) and at 8:30 a.m., the paratroopers dropped in the open, across the bay from Portoferraio. I. Bataillon, Panzergrenadier-Regiment 200 (3rd Battalion, Mechanised Infantry Regiment 200, Oberstleutnant Heinrich von Behr) arrived from Livorno in ferries and landed at Portoferraio. The Italians offered no resistance and the Germans soon captured the garrison and took over the artillery batteries and barracks.

Behr demanded the surrender of arms, artillery and vehicles along with the coastal guns (some of which were spiked by their crews). The paratroopers quickly departed the island, the infantry remaining while reinforcements arrived. The Germans pressured the Italian prisoners to sign a declaration agreeing to remain in military service, volunteer for labour service or be deported to internment camps in Germany. Gilardi prevaricated until 3 October then returned the declarations, in which only two of his officers agreed to remain in the army. The Germans began making arrests and on 7 October accused Gilardi of sabotage, arresting him and 250 army and 50 naval officers. From Piombino, they were deported to prison camps in occupied Poland.

=== German defences ===
On 5 December, Generalmajor Franz Gall was made commander of Verteidigungs-Abschnitt Elba (Elba Defence Sector) under LXXV Corps (LXXV. Armeekorps). By May 1944, Gall had Festungs-Bataillon 902 (FB 902, Fortress Battalion 902, Hauptmann Willi Kroeber), Festungs-Bataillon 908 (FB 908) and the VI Battaglione Difesa Costiera (Capitano Bugarelli, 6th CDB, Küsten-Festungs-Bataillon 6/6th Coast Defence Battalion). FB 902 and FB 908 had been formed from comb-outs in mid-1943, many of the men being frostbite casualties from Eastern Front. The battalions had about 520 men each in four companies, most armed with Italian weapons; about 10 per cent of the men were Volksdeutsche (ethnic Germans mainly from Poland and Czechoslovakia). The battalions had been rushed to Sardinia in September 1943, thence to Corsica and the Italian mainland. When FB 902 was moved by the Luftwaffe to Italy on 23 September 23, two aircraft had been shot down, one of the dead being Kroeber. In May 1944, his replacement, Major Dietze, wrote that most of his men were experienced but some were unable to march for long due to their frostbite injuries and that training was necessary on the Italian equipment.

The 6th CDB with about 650 men in four companies, had been formed in November 1943 at Modena sector from 18- to 21-year olds. Bugarelli, his officers and NCOs had volunteered to continue to fight alongside Germany but many of the recruits had been intimidated into "volunteering" by threats that their parents would be gaoled if they refused. The battalion was moved to Elba in February 1944 and its four companies were split between German infantry units. Marine-Artillerie-Abteilung 616 (Korvettenkapitän Max Schreiber) of the Kriegsmarine, was transferred from the Straits of Messina to operate six of the Italian coastal batteries. The detachment had 350 naval gunners and joined 200 Italian coastal gunners. Schreiber was also the naval commander on Elba with his HQ in Portoferraio. Three of the coastal batteries defended the north shore in the Portoferraio sector, 1. Batterie, Marine-Artillerie-Abteilung 616 took over Batteria Enfola with four 152 mm howitzers; the 9. Batterie took over Batteria Bianco with four 76 mm and two 75 mm anti-aircraft guns and the 7. Batterie took Batteria Fortino with three 102 mm anti-aircraft/coastal guns.

Two batteries defended the east shore near Porto Longone, the 8. Batterie manned Batteria Cannelle with four 102 mm guns and the 4. Batterie was at Batteria Ripalti with four 152 mm howitzers and two 76 mm anti-aircraft guns. The 6. Batterie took over Batteria Poro with a 102 mm gun and four 90 m anti-aircraft guns covering the Golfo di Campo at the middle of the south coast. The Italian Batteria Penisola and Batteria Le Grotte on the north coast, were not taken over, the first because it had been severely damaged in the bombing of 16 September. An improvised artillery unit, Abteilung z.b.V. (zur besonderen Verwendung [special duties], Oberleutnant Sterz) with 110 men, was moved to Elba in September. (Note: The unit had been hurriedly established at Brindisi in June 1943 with men from the Afrika Korps returning from leave and stranded by the Axis surrender in Tunisia the month before.) The Abteiling z.b.V comprised three batteries with eleven Italian 149 mm howitzers and five Italian 75 mm guns. Sterz reported that the unit was operational only because Italians from the 4th Battery of V Gruppo Artigliera Costiera, which had remained loyal to the Germans side knew how to operate the Italian equipment.

2. Batterie and 4. Batterie of Flak-Abteilung 192 (Oberleutnant Mahl), with 120 men, was transferred to Elba in November 1943, each with four German 88 mm guns and three 20 mm guns and was the only unit in the garrison armed with modern weapons. The batteries were emplaced across the bay from Portoferraio, several hundred yards apart, on the hills at Acquabona.The defence was organised into 13 coastal sectors, Stralsund and Athen covered the Golfo di Procchio west of Portoferraio. Pisa, Venedig, Palermo, Florenz and Neapel were along the bay to the south-east of Portoferraio, to fire Maria a planned artillery barrage to cover the mouth of the bay. München covered the bay near Porto Longone ready to fire barrage Hedwig. Berlin, Köhl and Ulm covered the Golfo Stella, Hamburg the Golfo della Lacona rady to fire barrage barrage Toni, Danzig covered the Golfo di Campo ready to fire barrage Almut. Local fishermen told the Allies that minefields closed the entrance to Portoferraio, the Golfo di Procchio, Golfo della Lacona and Golfo Stella. Civilians retained freedom of movement but fishing boats had to be moored in certain harbours and fishing was only allowed during the day, no more than 1.9 mi (3 km) offshore. By June 1944 the defence force on Elba comprised 2,600 men, 800 of whom were Italian. The units were improvised and the Italian contingent had been distributed among German units, most of the weapons were Italian. Many of the German officers ageing were reservists, including Gall.

=== Sardinia and Corsica ===
On 22 September, the Italian steamship Andrea Sgarallino, carrying civilian traffic from Piombino to Portoferraio, was torpedoed and sunk by the British submarine HMS Uproar, killing 200 civilians and leaving few survivors. The crew was Italian and the only Germans on board were checking the identity papers of the passengers. With Elba secure, the evacuation of Axis troops from Sardinia and Corsica had been made easier and in two weeks 6,294 soldiers, 3,026 vehicles, 361 guns, 105 tanks and 5,414 long tons (5,501 t) of equipment had been withdrawn to the mainland by sea. The Luftwaffe evacuated 23,192 German soldiers and 2,100 Italian troops with 619 long tons (629 t) of equipment. The air evacuation cost 25 Ju 52s, many being destroyed on the ground, when Allied bombers attacked the airfields at Pisa and Pontedera. Eighty ships of various types were lost, many to the bombing of ports in the Tuscan Archipelago and the mainland.

== Prelude ==
=== 15th Army Group ===
The Allied 15th Army Group (General Sir Harold Alexander), captured Rome on 4 June 1944 and forced Army Group C, the German 14th Army and 10th Army, to withdraw towards northern Italy. The Allied success was followed by orders for the invasion of southern France, Operation Dragoon, the majority of the troops for the landings being found by the 15th Army Group. The diversion of troops from Italy reduced the U.S. 5th Army to five divisions. The 15th Army Group was reduced to 18 divisions, the reduction in strength ending any possibility of Alexander reaching the Gothic Line by August 1944.

Lying between the mainland and Corsica 31 mi (50 km) to the west, obstructing access to the Tyrrhenian Sea, Elba was of considerable strategic importance. While the front line was south of Rome, Elba had been a useful Axis outpost which protected ships taking supplies to nearby ports on the mainland. The unexpected length of the Battle of Anzio (22 January – 5 June 1944) delayed planning for an invasion of Elba but work began on 7 April. French ground and air forces had fought well in Italy, had recently been re-equipped and the French commander in Corsica, General Joseph Magnan, was made commander of the operation with the US Air Force colonel T. C. Darcy being appointed the commander of the Allied air effort.

The Allied invasion was scheduled for 25 May, at the same time as Operation Diadem. The landings had then been postponed because of the shortage of support aircraft and to allow the inexperienced French troops more time for training. Supplies to the German forces in Italy were moved by road and rail along the Tuscan coast, with ferries moving more via the Piombino channel, a practical reason for the Allies to occupy the island. Allied Forces Headquarters (AFHQ) in Algiers made plans from April 1944 for Operation Brassard. Adolf Hitler "attached great importance to holding Elba as long as possible". On 12 June, the German commander in Italy, Field Marshal Albert Kesselring, was informed that "Elba must be defended to the last man and the last cartridge". On 14 June, German reinforcements started to arrive on Elba from Pianosa. The decision to reinforce Elba was not known to the Allies who believed the naval activity between the island and the mainland was an evacuation.

=== Operation Brassard ===
==== Force 255 ====
The force for the capture of Elba was code-named Force 255, comprising three French Regimental Combat Teams (RCT). Two of the RCTs were from the 9ème Division d'Infanterie Coloniale (Général Joseph Magnan), the first RCT had three battalions from the 13ème Régiment de Tirailleurs Sénégalais (West African troops in French service) commanded by Colonel Jean Chrétien, the second RCT had two battalions from the 4ème Régiment de Tirailleurs Sénégalais (Colonel Lucien Cariou). The third RCT comprised the 2ème Groupement de Tabors Marocains (Colonel Pierre Boyer de Latour). Two Commandos, the Bataillon de Choc (Colonel Fernand Gambiez) and the Commandos d'Afrique (Lieutenant-Colonel Georges-Régis Bouvet) were to silence the shore batteries. The commandos would land during the night, three hours before H-Hour. With an engineer beach group equipped for clearing mines and other obstacles, five batteries of 105 mm and one of 155 mm guns from the divisional artillery, anti-aircraft batteries and ten light tanks from the 9ème divisional reconnaissance regiment, the invasion force numbered 11,667 troops, with 86 guns, 250 mules and 481 vehicles, with Magnan in command. The follow-up force comprised 4,092 men, 37 guns and 444 vehicles. The operation commander was Général Jean de Lattre de Tassigny.

==== Force N ====
The naval operation by Force N to land Force 255 was commanded by Rear-Admiral Thomas Troubridge. The Royal Navy and US Navy provided four Landing Ship, Tank, 41 Landing craft tank (LCT), 42 Landing Craft Infantry Large [LCI(L)], 36 Landing Craft Assault (LCA) and 20 Landing Craft Vehicle Personnel (LCVP) to transport the French assault forces. The British provided the gunboats HMS Aphis, Scarab and Cockchafer, five Landing Craft Tank (Rocket) [LCT(R)], five Landing craft Gun (LCG), five LCF anti-aircraft landing craft, five LCS(M) machine-gun and mortar-armed support craft and four LCA(HR) spigot mortar-armed assault craft. Twelve motor torpedo boats and 39 PT boats would conduct diversions and close support. Colonel Thomas C. Darcy (USAAF), the commander of the 87th Fighter Wing of the Twelfth Air Force was placed in command of the air support for the invasion. Air support was to be provided by the 87th Fighter Wing and the 57th Bombardment Group, Mediterranean Allied Tactical Air Force and the 63rd Fighter Wing Mediterranean Allied Coastal Air Force. It was hoped that Darcy could land an advanced command post on Elba on D+1.

=== Plan ===
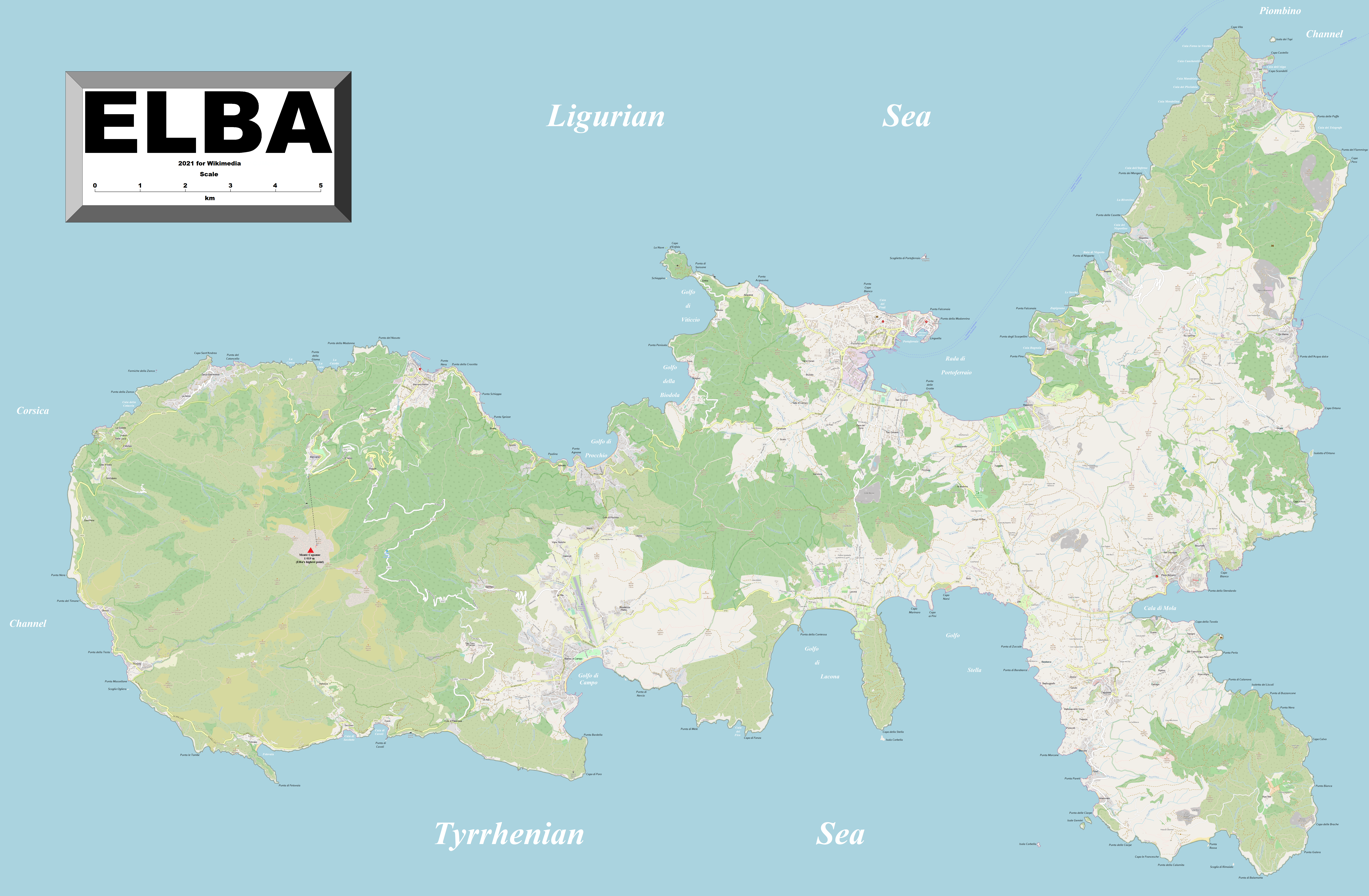
The Island of Elba [enlargeable]

Force N comprised three groups:

1. Motor Torpedo Boats and PT boats. They would initially create diversions and land the French Commandos on the northern side of the island. Their objective would be the gun batteries located there.
2. Five Landing Craft Infantry (LCI) and eight Motor Launches each towing a Landing Craft Assault (LCA). Their objective was four beaches on the south coast.
3. Main Force, in nine LCIs, four Landing Ship Tanks (LSTs), and three Motor Launches towing Landing Craft Support (medium). The main landings would be on two beaches codenamed Kodak Amber and Kodak Green at 04:00. They would be followed at 04:30 by another 28 LCIs and after dawn by 40 LCTs, bringing in heavier equipment.

In his briefing, Troubridge said he expected the shore batteries to have been destroyed by aerial bombardment and the commandos. He also said the garrison only consisted of about 800 men, mostly non-German, who were unlikely to put up much resistance.

== Invasion ==
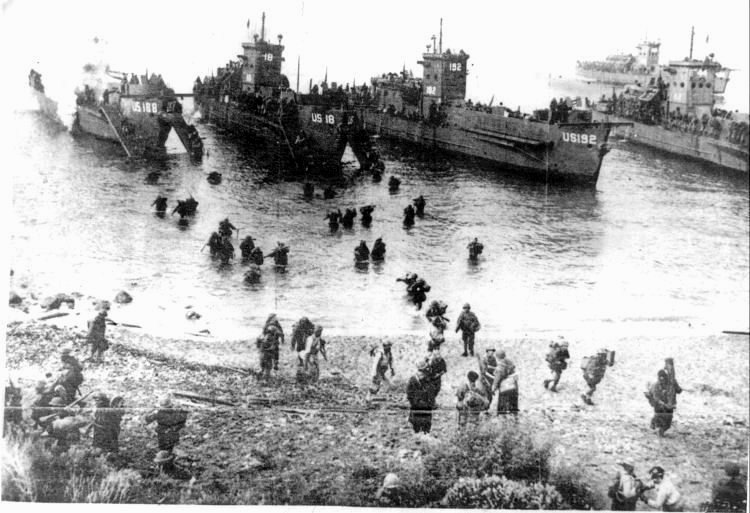
French 9th Colonial Division landing on Elba, 17 June 1944.

On 16 June, the day before the invasion, German reconnaissance aircraft spotted two flotillas of invasion ships but thought they were just the normal naval convoys between Naples and Bastia. To preserve surprise, there was no pre-invasion bombing until the night of 16/17 June, when 26 Vickers Wellingtons bombed Portoferraio and Porto Longone.

The 270 ships of the invasion fleet arrived off Elba just after midnight on 17 June, when ships from Group 1 disembarked 87 men from the Bataillon de Choc Commando in rubber dinghies .5 mi (0.80 km) offshore of Cape Enfola. The naval group then started laying a smokescreen. At 3:15 a.m., three other boats started laying smoke north of Portoferraio. With the German gun batteries engaging a retreating PT boat, four others made toward Portoferraio to simulate landing craft approaching, firing salvos of rockets and dropping dummies overboard to give the impression of troops wading ashore.

In the south, the main invasion force was approaching the island when, at 3:38 a.m., a signal flare was fired and the Germans opened fire on the landing craft. The Royal Navy Commandos of Able 1 and Oboe 3 Commando with Able 2 in reserve landed at 3:50 a.m.. They approached the beach toward their objective, the German flak ship Köln, which was berthed at Marina di Campo and had a commanding view of both beaches. The capture or destruction of the ship was vital to the landings. The A1 Commando were assigned the task of capturing the ship, while O3 Commando would defend the jetty from any attack by German reinforcements. The two landing craft of the Royal Navy Commandos entered the bay of Marina di Campo and made for the flak ship. They came under massed fire before one landing craft was hit and ran aground; the landing craft managed to get alongside the flak ship before also being hit by gunfire. The men of A commando quickly captured Köln while O Commando secured the jetty. Both commandos now waited for the French to secure the village.

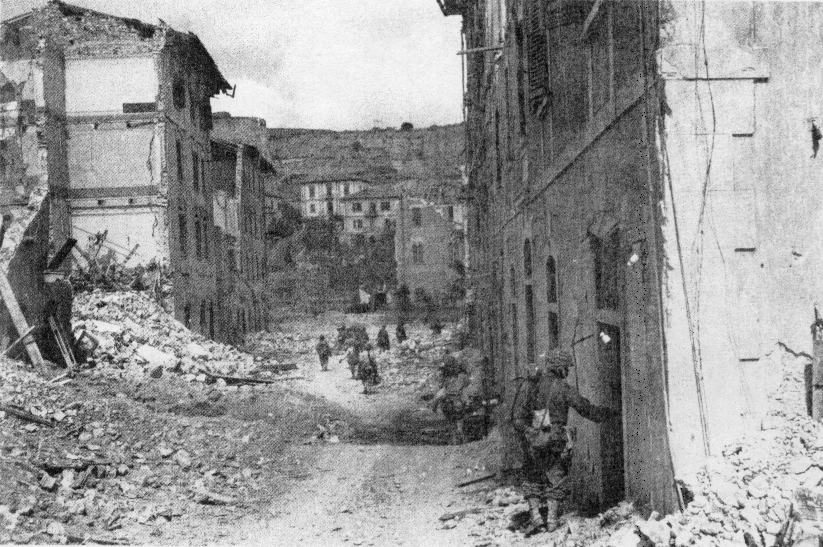
French troops enter Portoferraio, 18 June 1944

The LCVPs carrying the French division beached on time to be met by massed machine gun and 88 mm (3.46 in) fire. By 7:00 a.m., the German defences in the hills above Kodak Amber beach had forced the incoming landing craft to lay smoke and withdraw. The defensive fire forced the follow-up waves of landing craft to divert to Kodak Green beach, which caused some congestion on the beachhead. Delays and German gunfire kept some landing craft off shore until 2:00 p.m..

The Commandos, unaware of the diversion to the other beach, had to wait some hours before the French cleared the village and reached them. It was during this time that the Commandos suffered their greatest losses. The commandos were under continuous artillery and small arms fire, which is believed to have set off two demolition charges on the jetty, blowing a 30 ft (9.1 m) hole in the concrete structure. The force of the explosions killed almost all the commandos and their prisoners. It also set fire to Köln and exploded the ammunition stowed on board.

Within two hours of the landings, French commandos had reached the crest of the 1,300 ft (400 m) Monte Tambone Ridge overlooking the landing areas. Portoferraio was taken by the 9th Division on 18 June and the island was largely secured by the following day. Fighting in the hills between the Germans and the Senegalese colonial infantry was vicious, with the Senegalese employing flamethrowers to clear entrenched German troops. On 19 June, the German commander asked for permission to evacuate what was left of his forces. By the evening on 20 June, they had evacuated 400 men to the mainland.

== Aftermath ==
=== Analysis ===
The invasion of Elba was of dubious necessity. The advance of the U.S. 5th Army past Grosseto had made the occupation of the island by the Germans untenable. The Germans defended Elba with two infantry battalions, fortified coastal areas and several coastal artillery batteries totalling some 60 guns of medium and heavy calibre.

=== Casualties ===
In 1952, Tassigny wrote that the fighting for the island, the Germans lost 500 dead, with another 1,995 becoming prisoners of war. French losses were 252 killed or missing, and 635 men wounded, while the British lost 38 killed and nine wounded. (Note: General de Tassigny went on to command the French 1st Army in the invasion of southern France. This force fought through Europe to the Austrian border by the end of the war.) In 2016, Jean Paul Pallud wrote that the French suffered casualties of 201 men killed, 51 missing and 635 wounded. The British suffered 38 men killed and nine wounded with Royal Navy casualties of 65 men killed and 100 wounded. The Axis defenders suffered 672 dead and missing (507 German and 165 Italian), with 1,383 German and 612 Italian troops taken prisoner. of war. A French report listed the capture of 48 guns and howitzers and 100 machine-guns.

=== Marocchinate ===
Troops of the 9ème Division d'Infanterie Coloniale and the Groupement de Tabors Marocains inflicted outrages on civilians, raping, robbing, burgling houses, looting cattle and wine and killing those who tried to stop them. Their officers did nothing, saying "this is war" when complained to or that it was "nothing compared to what the Italians did in Corsica". The population took to the hills until order was restored, when the troops of the 9ème Division d'Infanterie Coloniale and the Groupement de Tabors were replaced by a battalion of the 29ème Régiment de Tirailleurs Algériens.
