= Lothar Gall =

German historian (1936–2024)

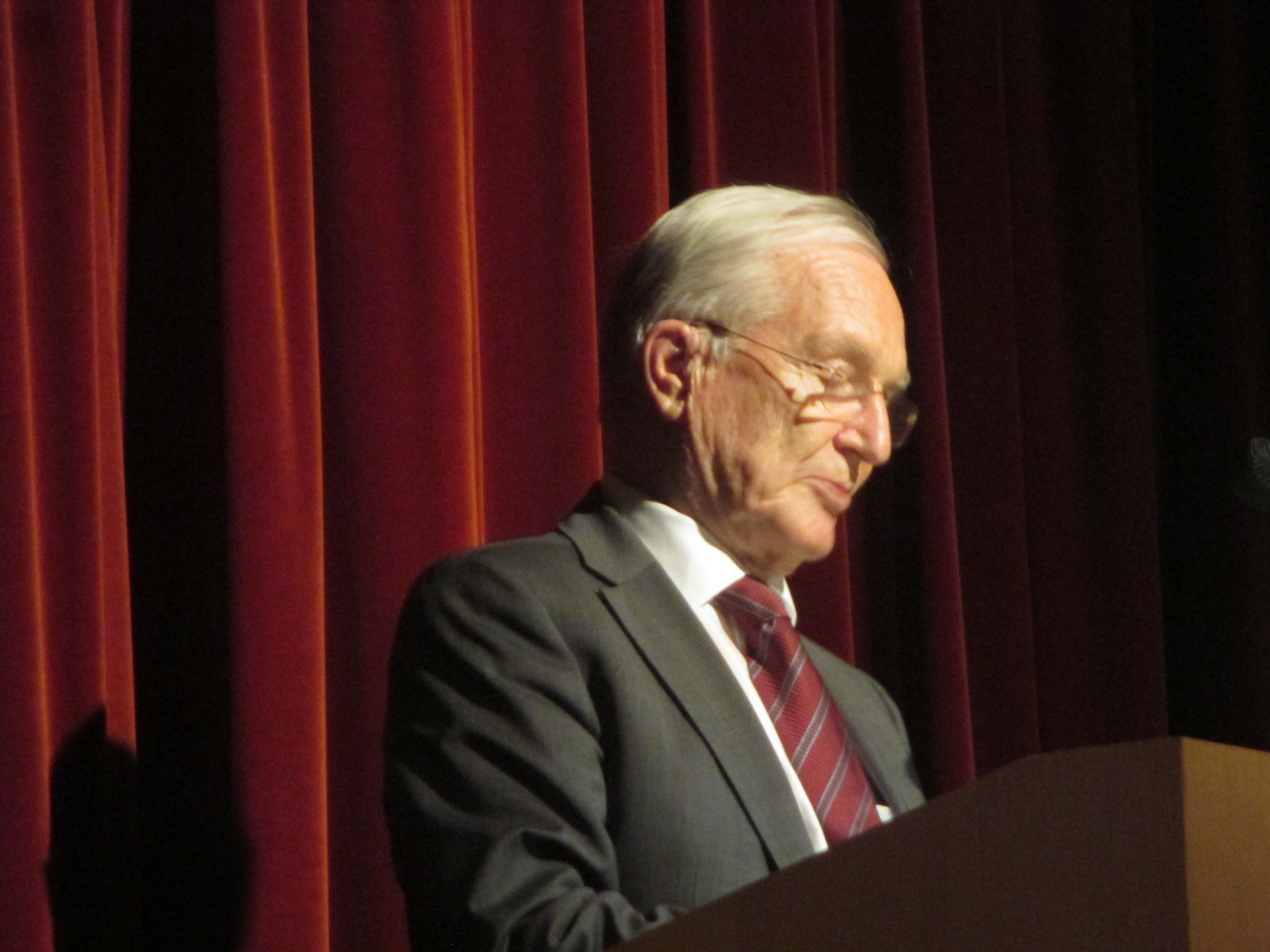
- Gall in 2014
- Born: 3 December 1936; Lötzen, East Prussia, Germany
- Died: 20 June 2024 (aged 87)
- Occupation: Historian
- Parent: Franz Gall
- Awards: Leibniz Prize; Balzan Prize

Lothar Gall (3 December 1936 – 20 June 2024) was a German historian known as "one of German liberalism's primary historians". He was a professor of history at Goethe University Frankfurt from 1975 until his retirement in 2005. His biography of Otto von Bismarck has been translated into English, French, Italian, and Japanese.

== Life and career ==
Gall was born in Lötzen on 3 December 1936. His father was Franz Gall, a Wehrmacht lieutenant general killed in Italy in December 1944. Gall studied history and Romance and German languages in Munich and Mainz. His 1960 doctoral thesis examined the political thought of Benjamin Constant, a French liberal, and its influence in Vormärz Germany. His 1967 habilitation at the University of Cologne was supervised by Theodor Schieder.

His next book was a regional study of liberalism in Baden between 1848 and 1871. This informed an influential 1975 article about the effects of the 1848 revolution upon German liberalism. Gall argued that the revolution transformed liberalism from a constitutional movement committed to a classless society of burghers to an economically bourgeois ideology committed to free-market capitalism. His biography of Otto von Bismarck has been translated into English, French, Italian, and Japanese.

Gall was appointed as a professor at the Justus-Liebig-Universität Gießen in 1968. Four years later he became a professor at the Freie Universität Berlin. He was a guest professor at the University of Oxford from 1972 to 1973. Gall also taught at the University of Frankfurt starting in 1975, and became a professor emeritus in 2005. He focused on the history of liberalism in Europe and was an expert in Bismarck research. His 1980 book Bismarck. Der weiße Revolutionär was regarded as the first modern biography of Bismarck.

Gall died on 20 June 2024, at the age of 87.

== Works ==
Gall's works include:

- Benjamin Constant. Seine politische Ideenwelt und der deutsche Vormärz, 1963, ISSN 0537-7919).
- Der Liberalismus als regierende Partei. Das Großherzogtum Baden zwischen Restauration und Reichsgründung (= Veröffentlichungen des Instituts für Europäische Geschichte Mainz. Bd. 47). Steiner, Wiesbaden 1968 (habilitation).
- Das Bismarck-Problem in der Geschichtsschreibung nach 1945, 1971.
- Bismarck. Der weiße Revolutionär. 1980, ISBN 3-549-07397-6. Translated by J. A. Underwood as Bismarck, the White Revolutionary, 1986.
- Europa auf dem Weg in die Moderne, 1850–1890, 1984, ISBN 3-486-49771-5.
- Bürgertum in Deutschland, Siedler, Berlin 1989, ISBN 3-88680-259-0
- Bismarck. Ein Lebensbild. Lübbe, Bergisch Gladbach 1991, ISBN 3-7857-0599-9.
- Die Deutsche Bank, 1870–1995, 1995.
- Krupp. Der Aufstieg eines Industrieimperiums. Siedler, Berlin 2000, ISBN 3-88680-583-2.
- Milestones – Setbacks – Sidetracks: The Path to Parliamentary Democracy in Germany, Historical Exhibition in the Deutscher Dom in Berlin (2003), exhibitioncatalog
- Der Bankier Hermann Josef Abs. Eine Biographie. Beck, Munich 2004, ISBN 3-406-52195-9.
- Otto von Bismarck – Bild und Image. Otto-von-Bismarck-Stiftung, Friedrichsruh 2006, ISBN 3-933418-30-5.
- Walther Rathenau. Portrait einer Epoche. Beck, Munich 2009, ISBN 978-3-406-57628-7.
- Wilhelm von Humboldt. Ein Preuße von Welt. Propyläen-Verlag, Berlin 2011, ISBN 978-3-549-07369-8.
- Franz Adickes. Oberbürgermeister und Universitätsgründer. Societäts-Verlag, Frankfurt 2013, ISBN 978-3-95542-018-5.
- Hardenberg. Reformer und Staatsmann. Piper, München 2016, ISBN 978-3-492-05798-1.
- „Der hiesigen Stadt zu einer wahren Zierde und deren Bürgerschaft nützlich“. Städel und sein „Kunst-Institut“. Städelscher Museums-Verein, Frankfurt am Main 1991.
- Von der ständischen zur bürgerlichen Gesellschaft (Enzyklopädie deutscher Geschichte. Bd. 25). Oldenbourg, München 1993, ISBN 3-486-55753-X.
- "Die Germania als Symbol nationaler Identität im 19. und 20. Jahrhundert". In: Nachrichten der Akademie der Wissenschaften Göttingen, I. Philologisch-Historische Klasse 1993, S. 35–88.
- mit Gerald D. Feldman, Harold James, Carl-Ludwig Holtfrerich, Hans E. Büschgen: Die Deutsche Bank. 1870–1995. Beck, München 1995, ISBN 3-406-38945-7.
  - S. 1–135: "Die Deutsche Bank von ihrer Gründung bis zum Ersten Weltkrieg 1870–1914"
- mit Ralf Roth: 1848/49. Die Eisenbahn und die Revolution. Deutsche Bahn AG, Berlin 1999.
- Otto von Bismarck und Wilhelm II. Repräsentanten eines Epochenwechsels? (= Friedrichsruher Beiträge. Bd. 4). Otto-von-Bismarck-Stiftung, Friedrichsruh 1999, ISBN 3-933418-03-8.
- mit Karl-Heinz Jürgens: Bismarck. Lebensbilder. Lübbe, Bergisch Gladbach 1990, ISBN 3-7857-0569-7.
- (ed.) Stadt und Bürgertum im 19. Jahrhundert, 1990.
- (ed.) Vom alten zum neuen Bürgertum. Die mitteleuropäische Stadt im Umbruch 1780–1820, 1991.
- (ed.) Neuerscheinungen zur Geschichte des 20. Jahrhunderts, 1992.
- (ed.) Stadt und Bürgertum im Übergang von der traditionalen zur modernen Gesellschaft, 1993.
- (ed. with Dieter Langewiesche) Liberalismus und Region: Zur Geschichte des deutschen Liberalismus im 19. Jahrhundert, 1995
- (ed.) Bürgertum und bürgerlich-liberale Bewegung in Mitteleuropa seit dem 18. Jahrhundert, 1997

== Awards ==
- Wolf-Erich-Kellner-Preis (1968)
- Order of Merit of the Federal Republic of Germany (1983, 1987, and 1998)
- Leibniz Prize of the DFG (1988)
- Herbert-Quandt-Medien-Preis (1990)
- Balzan Prize of history (1993)
- Hessian Order of Merit (2006)
