= Amedeo Nomis di Pollone =

Italian admiral

- Born: 30 June 1893; Campiglione-Fenile, Kingdom of Italy
- Died: 12 December 1984 (aged 91); Rome, Italy
- Military career
- Allegiance: Kingdom of Italy
- Branch: Regia Marina
- Service years: 1912–1946
- Rank: Fleet Admiral
- Commands: Cesare Battisti (destroyer); Pola (heavy cruiser); Duca d'Aosta (light cruiser); Fleet Destroyer Group; Commander-in-chief of torpedo ships Sardinia Naval Command; Northern Adriatic Naval Command
- Conflicts: Italo-Turkish War; World War I; Adriatic Campaign of World War I; World War II; Battle of the Mediterranean
- Awards: Silver Medal of Military Valor; War Cross for Military Valor; War Merit Cross; Military Order of Italy; Order of Saints Maurice and Lazarus; Order of the Crown of Italy; Colonial Order of the Star of Italy; Iron Cross second class

Amedeo Nomis di Pollone (Campiglione-Fenile, 30 June 1893 – Rome, 12 December 1984) was an Italian admiral in the Regia Marina during World War II.

== Biography ==
Born in Campiglione in 1893, he entered the Naval Academy of Livorno in 1912, graduating in 1914 with the rank of ensign after having participated in the Italo-Turkish War as a cadet officer on the protected cruiser Etna. During the First World War he initially served on the battleship Napoli and then on the destroyer Ippolito Nievo, earning a War Cross for Military Valor. In September 1917 he was promoted to Lieutenant and assigned on the battleship Regina Elena and later on the scout cruiser Marsala, taking part in the occupation of towns and islands in Istria and Dalmatia after the Italian victory in November 1918.

From August 1921 to March 1924 he served as aide-de-camp to Ferdinando of Savoy, Prince of Udine, after which he was in command of a torpedo boat and later of a gunboat. After promotion to lieutenant commander, in 1928–1929 he commanded the destroyer Cesare Battisti; from 1929 to 1932 he served as aide to Prince Eugenio, Duke of Ancona, being promoted to commander in 1930. In 1935 he was promoted to captain, after which he commanded the heavy cruiser Pola from 1936 to 1938 and the light cruiser Emanuele Filiberto Duca d'Aosta from 1938 to February 1939. He then became naval attaché in Paris from September 1939 to June 1940.

After Italy's entry into World War II, Nomis di Pollone was appointed chief of staff of the Naval Department of Naples, and was later transferred to Supermarina, being promoted to Rear Admiral in November 1940. In 1941 he was given command of the Fleet Destroyer Group, participating as escort leader in a number of escort missions to supply convoys sailing between Italy and North Africa, usually with a Navigatori-class destroyer as flagship. For these activities he was awarded the Silver Medal of Military Valor by Italy and the Iron Cross second class by Germany. From May 1942 to June 1943 he served as aide-de-camp to Admiral Aimone of Savoy, being promoted to Vice Admiral in September 1942, and on 26 June 1943 he was appointed commander-in-chief of destroyers and torpedo boats.

At the proclamation of the Armistice of Cassibile, Nomis di Pollone was in La Spezia, where he had just arrived from Rome, with the order of taking command of the torpedo boats stationed in the ports of the northern Tyrrhenian Sea. After receiving the order to reach an Allied-controlled port, he and Prince Aimone boarded the torpedo boat Indomito and sailed to Portoferraio, Elba Island, where all the smaller warships of the northern Tyrrhenian were gathered under the command of Nomis di Pollone. On 11 September 1943 the flotilla, which consisted of ten torpedo boats, five corvettes, five submarines, one motor torpedo boat and a dozen submarine chasers, left Portoferraio for Palermo, where they arrived on the following day, and from where on 20 September they were transferred to Malta.

From August 1944 to December 1945 he was naval commander of Sardinia, with headquarters in La Maddalena, and from January to September 1946 he held the naval command of the northern Adriatic Sea, with headquarters in Venice. He retired from active service on 31 December 1946, at his own request, and was promoted to full Admiral in the naval reserve in 1958. He died in Rome in 1984.
