= Royal Naval Commandos =

Royal Naval Commandos Royal Navy Beach Commandos
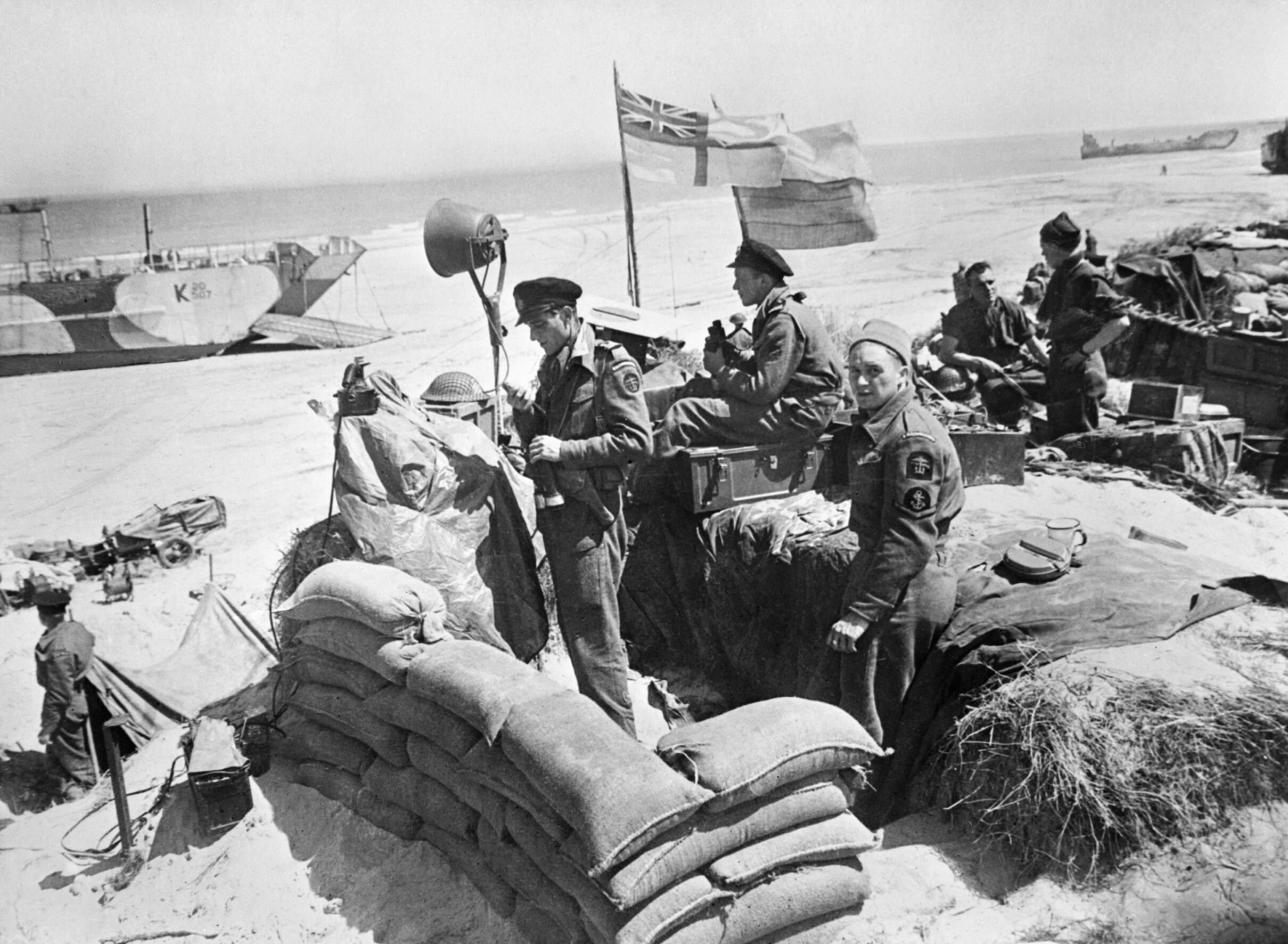
- A beach party from the Royal Naval Commandos at Normandy, 13 June 1944
- Active: 1942–45
- Country: United Kingdom
- Branch: Royal Navy
- Type: Commando
- Role: Amphibious warfare Beachhead duties
- Size: 22 units each consisting of 10 officers and 65 ratings
- Motto: In Primo Exulto (Latin: "First in last out")
- Engagements: Second World War: Battle of Madagascar; Operation Jubilee; Operation Torch; Operation Husky; Operation Neptune; Invasion of Elba (Operation Brassard); Burma Campaign; Greece; Yugoslavia; Assault on Walcheren; Operation Market-Garden

Insignia
- Combined Operations Shoulder Flash

The Royal Naval Commandos, also known as RN Beachhead Commandos, were a commando formation of the Royal Navy which served during the Second World War. The first units were raised in 1942 and by the end of the war, 22 company-sized units had been raised to carry out various tasks associated with establishing, maintaining and controlling beachheads during amphibious operations. The Beach Commando's principal duty was "the quick and safe turnaround of all boats on the beaches".

Royal Naval Commando parties took part in all Allied amphibious landings from early 1942 to the end of the war, when they were disbanded. Operations included the landings at Diego Suarez on Madagascar, Operation Torch (North Africa), Operation Neptune (Normandy landings), the Screwdriver operations in Burma, Operation Market-Garden, Invasion of Elba (codename Operation Brassard) and the assault on Walcheren.

== History ==
=== Formation ===
Early Allied amphibious operations during the war were hampered by poor organisation and control of the landing beaches. In 1941 the Naval Beach Parties, which were the forerunners to the Royal Naval Commandos, were raised.

The first Royal Naval Commandos were formed from these beach parties shortly after Operation Ironclad, the initial Allied landings on Madagascar to capture the Vichy French-held port of Diego Suarez in early May 1942. During this operation specially-trained Royal Navy beach parties were landed along with the first wave of assault troops in order to organise the beachheads and control the landings. The success of these parties led to the decision to form the Royal Naval Commandos and over the course of 1942–43 personnel were selected and training undertaken at HMS Armadillo at Ardentinny and then later at the commando school at Achnacarry in Scotland.

In the end 22 Royal Naval Commando units were raised, designated 'A' through to 'W' (although there was no 'I' Commando), each with its own distinctively coloured lanyard worn on the left shoulder when wearing general British army battledress. Of note, 'W' Commando was formed from personnel drawn from the Royal Canadian Navy. Each unit was roughly equivalent in size to a company.

=== Composition ===
Each commando was commanded by an officer of the rank of lieutenant commander or commander and divided into three numbered sections ("parties"). When first raised in 1942 the structure of a section was two officers (Beach Master and Assistant Beach Master), a petty officer and seventeen other ratings of varying rank.

By 1943, the official Beach Commando structure was a Principal Beachmaster (who was also the deputy Senior Naval Officer Landing) with a Deputy Principal Beach Master and one ordinary seaman and three Beach Parties each of one Beach Master, two Assistant Beach Masters, two petty officers, two leading seaman, six able seamen and 14 ordinary seamen—a total of 11 officers, 6 petty officers and 67 other ratings.

On operations where the beach needed to be cleared the Beach Party would be attached to a Beach Company (five officers and 142 men) within a Beach Group that included an Army infantry battalion and other troops—the battalion commander being the Beach Group Commander. The beach parties were armed with a Lewis gun, three Lanchester submachine guns, rifles and pistols but were expected to be able to use any weapons they encountered.

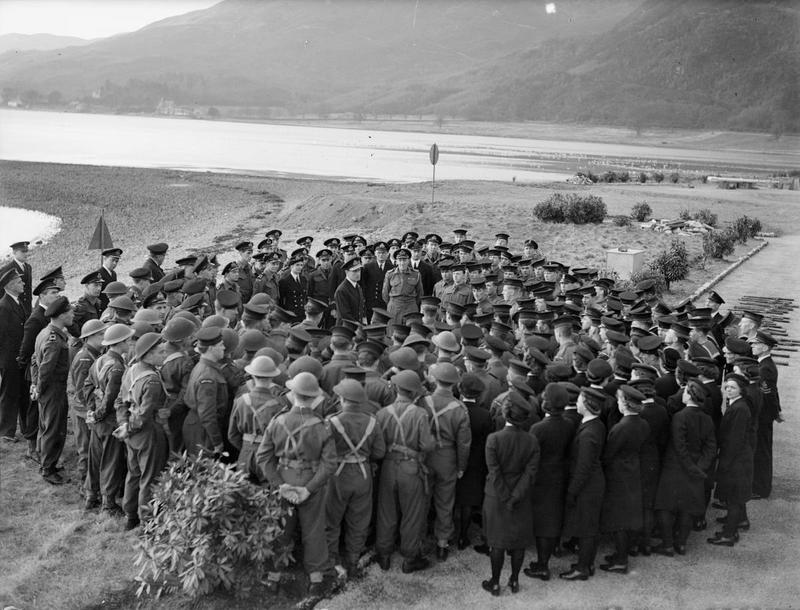
Chief of Combined Operations visit of Inspection, 6 March 1943, at HMS Armadillo and HMS Pasco, Lord Louis Mountbatten Chief of Combined Operations inspects units of his command at Armadillo

=== Operations ===
Due to their specialised skills, parties from the Royal Naval Commandos took part in every amphibious operation carried out by Allies from early 1942 to the end of the war. Following their initial involvement in Operation Ironclad on Madagascar, the next major operation that the Royal Naval Commandos were involved in came in August 1942, when two Royal Naval Commandos units—'C' and 'D'—were involved in the ill-fated Operation Jubilee. The units provided a beachmaster and beach party to each of the landing beaches, however, in the end many of the parties were unable to get ashore, while those that managed to land were prevented from carrying out their assigned tasks due to the high volume of machine gun fire directed on the beaches from the Germans defending them. As a result, casualties among the naval commandos were high and when the operation was eventually abandoned, most of the survivors were taken prisoner.

During Operation Torch the Royal Naval Commando contribution consisted of parties from 'C', 'E', 'F' and 'G' Commandos augmented with elements from 'H' and 'J'. Spread across the three task forces, the naval commandos—wearing American uniforms in some cases, in order to placate the Vichy French defenders—landed among the first wave of troops at Casablanca, Oran and Algiers. After clearing the defending troops from the beaches, carried out the task of marking out the beachhead, organising the wounded and prisoners of war, and controlling the subsequent waves that were landing on the beaches.

In June 1943, 'D' Commando took part in the landing on Pantelleria, while in July seven naval commandos—'C', 'E', 'F', 'G', 'K', 'M' and 'N'—took part in the Allied invasion of Sicily, providing beach parties to 27 different beaches. In September 1943 parties from 'C', 'G', 'H', 'K', 'M', 'N' and ‘O’ Commandos took part in the landings on mainland Italy. Landing at Salerno and Anzio, they undertook tasks including clearing mines from the beaches. Later in June 1944, 'A' and 'O' parties suffered heavy casualties when they were involved in Operation Brassard, the capture of the island of Elba. Others took part in Allied operations in Yugoslavia and Greece.

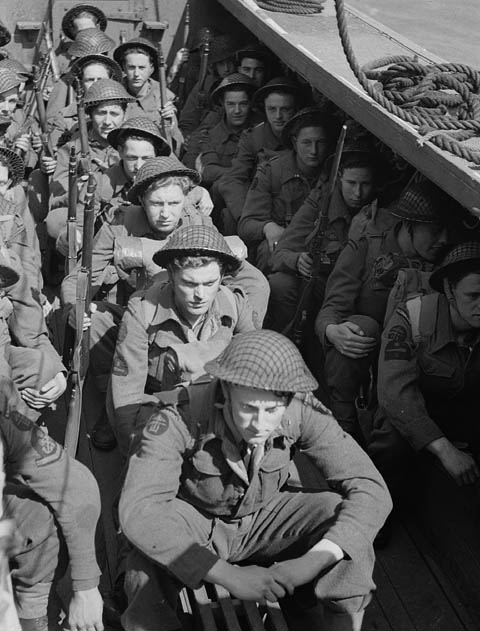
British commandos

Also in June 1944, eight units—'F', 'J', 'L', 'P', 'Q', 'R', 'S', 'T' and 'W' Commandos, the latter made up of volunteers from the Royal Canadian Navy—took part in Operation Neptune during the D-Day landings in Normandy in June 1944. Here they were involved in establishing and defending the landing beaches against German counterattacks at the same time as carrying out their assigned tasks of controlling the beaches to ensure the steady and efficient flow of supplies and men to the front. The parties remained in Normandy for about six weeks before they were withdrawn to reconstitute in preparation for further operations. These operations were limited in scope after the effort of D-Day, but included participation in the assault on Walcheren with the Royal Marines Commandos from the 4th Special Service Brigade and attempts by 'L' and 'M' Commandos to cross the Rhine at Arnhem during Operation Market-Garden.

After this, the decision was made that the Royal Naval Commandos would be moved to the Far East. In February 1944, 'H' Commando had been involved in landings along the Arakan coast as part of Operation Screwdriver, while 'C' and 'E' Commandos undertook operations in Malaya later. As the war in Europe was coming to an end it was felt that the naval commandos would be able to play a role in later operations against the Japanese where they would be involved in operations that were planned for Malaya and the home islands of Japan and in this regard, seven units—'C', 'E', 'H', 'J', 'M', 'N', 'R' and 'V' Commandos—were allocated to these operations, but in the end the war in the Pacific ended before they were deployed.

=== Disbandment ===
Following the end of the war, the Royal Naval Commando units were disbanded. The process began in late 1944 as the need for beach parties decreased and was finally completed in 1945.

== Battle honours ==
The following battle honours were awarded to the British Commandos during the Second World War.

- Adriatic
- Alethangyaw
- Aller
- Anzio
- Argenta Gap
- Burma 1943–45
- Crete
- Dieppe
- Dives Crossing
- Djebel Choucha
- Flushing
- Greece 1944–45
- Italy 1943–45
- Kangaw
- Landing at Porto San Venere
- Landing in Sicily
- Leese
- Litani
- Madagascar
- Middle East 1941, 1942, 1944
- Monte Ornito
- Myebon
- Normandy Landing
- North Africa 1941–43
- North-West Europe 1942, 1944–1945
- Norway 1941
- Pursuit to Messina
- Rhine
- St. Nazaire
- Salerno
- Sedjenane 1
- Sicily 1943
- Steamroller Farm
- Syria 1941
- Termoli
- Vaagso
- Valli di Comacchio
- Westkapelle

== See also ==
- Royal Australian Navy Beach Commandos
