= Pellegrino Matteucci (admiral) =

Italian admiral

- Born: 26 December 1887; Bologna, Kingdom of Italy
- Died: 18 August 1971 (aged 83); Bologna, Italy
- Military career
- Allegiance: Kingdom of Italy
- Branch: Regia Marina
- Rank: Squadron Admiral
- Commands: Antonio Pacinotti (submarine depot ship); Lanzerotto Malocello (destroyer); Zara (heavy cruiser); Italian East Africa Naval Command; 1st Naval Division; North Africa Naval Command; Corsica Naval Command; Southern France Naval Command; Toulon Naval Fortress Area
- Conflicts: Italo-Turkish War; World War I; World War II; Battle of Punta Stilo; Battle of Cape Spartivento; North African campaign; Italian occupation of Corsica; Italian occupation of France; Operation Achse
- Awards: War Cross for Military Valor (three times); War Merit Cross (three times); Military Order of Savoy; Order of Saints Maurice and Lazarus; Order of the Crown of Italy; Colonial Order of the Star of Italy; Order of the German Eagle

Pellegrino Matteucci Armandi Avogli Trotti (Bologna, 26 December 1887 – 18 August 1971) was an Italian admiral during World War II.

== Biography ==
Born in Bologna in 1887, he entered the Naval Academy of Livorno in 1905, graduating in 1909 with the rank of ensign. In 1908, while still an officer cadet, he participated in the relief efforts after the Messina earthquake, for which he received a medal of merit. In 1911-1912 he participated in the Italo-Turkish War as sub-lieutenant embarked on the battleship Napoli and then on the gunboat Volturno, being awarded War Cross for Military Valor for his participation in the landing at Tobruk. During World War I he initially served on the battleship Duilio and then again on Napoli, with the rank of lieutenant, after which he was given command of a torpedo boat, receiving another War Cross for Military Valor for an action off the coast of Durrës.

In 1922 he was promoted lieutenant commander and appointed naval attaché in Bucharest, where he remained until 1925; two years later he was promoted to commander and given command of the submarine depot ship Antonio Pacinotti and then of the destroyer Lanzerotto Malocello. In 1933 he was promoted to captain, spending a period in shore assignments at the Naval Department of La Spezia and then at the Ministry of the Navy, before assuming command of the heavy cruiser Zara from 1935 to 1937. At the end of 1937 he was promoted to Rear Admiral and appointed naval commander of Italian East Africa, a post he held until 1939.

In January 1940, after being promoted to divisional admiral, he was given command of the 1st Naval Division, which he still held at the time of Italy's entry into World War II; he then participated in the battles of Punta Stilo and of Cape Spartivento. In December 1940 he left command of the Division and in the following April he became Italian naval commander in North Africa, a post he held for a year, being awarded the grand cross of merit of the Order of the German Eagle with star and swords by the German authorities. In November 1942, following the Axis occupation of Corsica, he assumed command of Italian naval forces on the island until the following May, when he became senior Italian naval commander in France (Mariprovenza) as well as commander of the Toulon Naval Fortress Area. There he was at the proclamation of the Armistice of Cassibile and there he was captured by German troops in the night between 10 and 11 September 1943, being then transferred first to Lyon and then to the internment camp of Vittel. In February 1944 he was handed over to the authorities of the Italian Social Republic and accused of "treason" for the armistice events by the Special Tribunal for the Defense of the State during the so-called Admirals' Trial, but was the charges against him were dropped at the end of the preliminary investigation.

He retired from active service in 1945 and was promoted to squadron admiral of the naval reserve in 1952. He died in Bologna in 1971.
