= Gino Pavesi =

Italian admiral

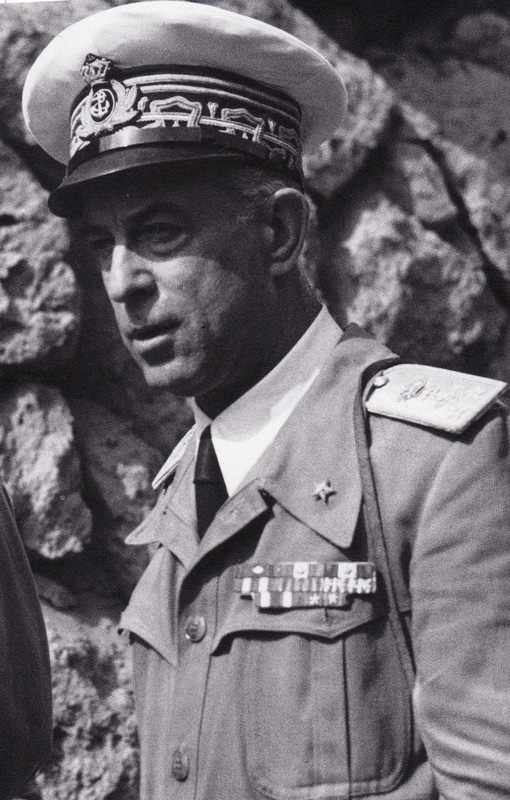
- Admiral Pavesi after his capture on Pantelleria
- Born: May 9, 1888; Pisa, Tuscany, Italy
- Died: February 3, 1960 (aged 71); Rome, Latium, Italy
- Military career
- Allegiance: Kingdom of Italy; Italy
- Branch: Regia Marina; Italian Navy
- Service years: 1906–1957
- Rank: Ammiraglio di Divisione (Vice Admiral)
- Commands: Enrico Cosenz (destroyer); Cesare Battisti (destroyer); Antonio Pigafetta (destroyer); Lanzerotto Malocello (destroyer); Luigi Cadorna (light cruiser); Pantelleria Naval Area
- Conflicts: Italo-Turkish War; World War I; Adriatic Campaign; World War II; Operation Corkscrew

Gino Pavesi (May 9, 1888 – February 3, 1960) was an Italian admiral during World War II.

== Early life and career ==
Born in Pisa in 1888, Gino Pavesi entered the Naval Academy in Livorno in 1906, graduating as an ensign in 1909. In 1911-1912 Pavesi participated in the Italo-Turkish War with the rank of sub-lieutenant, on board the armored cruiser Giuseppe Garibaldi. During World War I he served on battleships (including Ammiraglio di Saint Bon) and destroyers (including Antonio Mosto).

Between 1925 and 1926, with the rank of lieutenant commander, he served as the executive officer of the light cruiser Ancona; after promotion to commander, between 1926 and 1927 he commanded the destroyers Enrico Cosenz and Cesare Battisti. Between 1933 and 1935, after promotion to captain, he commanded the destroyers Antonio Pigafetta and Lanzerotto Malocello and their Squadron; between 1936 and 1937 he served as the commanding officer of the light cruiser Luigi Cadorna. He also held shore assignments, mainly at High Command of the Royal Naval Crews Corps (Corpo dei Regi Equipaggi Marittimi, C.R.E.M.) in the Ministry of the Navy. After he has been promoted rear admiral (lower half) in January 1940, Pavesi became superior commander of High Command of the Royal Naval Crews Corps.

== World War II ==
After promotion to rear admiral in January 1940, Pavesi was serving at the Inspectorate for preparation and testing of new ships when Italy entered World War II (June 10, 1940); in February 1941 he became inspector of schools under the C.R.E.M. High Command, of which in November 1941 he became himself the commander. He was promoted to vice admiral in September 1942, and appointed commander of the Pantelleria Naval Area in March 1943.

The island of Pantelleria was a heavily fortified stronghold, with an airport in cave (where 60 fighter aircraft were based), sheltered from air strikes, eight anti-ship batteries (overall twelve 152 mm guns, thirteen 120 mm guns, and twelve 90 mm guns) and 14 anti-aircraft batteries, with a total of seventy-six 76 mm guns. The island had a garrison of 11,420 men, mostly in defensive positions located in caves; the food reserves, according to some sources, could last for 20, 30 or 50 days. The fortification works, however, were not yet completed at the time of Italy's entry into the war, and during the following three years they had progressed at a slow pace; consequently, the island's defenses had several weaknesses: although the main ammunition depot was also located in a cave, ammunition had to be distributed to the batteries via exposed roads; three wells with electrically operated pumps were to ensure water autonomy of Pantelleria, but the power plant was not complete (therefore the island's resistance depended on water supplies sent from Italy), and only a few tank trucks were available for the distribution of water on the island; because of the high costs, the planned cave emplacements for the artillery had not yet been realized, so that all the batteries were in the open, and so were the phone lines, which were therefore highly vulnerable; there were neither underwater and permanent obstacles nor minefields. With the surrender of the Axis forces in Tunisia, in May 1943, Pantelleria found itself at the forefront; but the civilian population, which numbered more than 10,000, was not evacuated and found itself with no air-raid shelters (therefore having to use the same shelters as the garrison).

The capture of Pantelleria and the Pelagian Islands, although not critical to the planned invasion of Sicily, could be very useful for the Allies because it would provide another airport in addition the already overcrowded ones in Malta, in addition to eliminating an Italian outpost that could still be a source of disturbance. Operation Corkscrew started on May 8, 1943: from that day, for over a month, the island was subjected to continuous air strikes by about 1,500 British and American aircraft, in order to annihilate its defenses and the morale of the garrison, in preparation of an Allied landing; 6,202 tons of bombs were dropped over the island, of which 4,705 tons were dropped from 7 to 11 June. Two naval bombardments were also carried out on 8 and 11 June; ships of the Royal Navy also enforced a blockade in the waters around the island, although this did not entirely prevent the arrival of supplies sent at night with motor barges and other small vessels. The air raids disrupted communications and road network, making the distribution of food and water extremely difficult, put out of the power plant and destroyed part of the artillery positions (but still on the evening of June 9, 48% of anti-aircraft batteries and 80% of anti-ship batteries were functional). Casualties among the garrison and the civilian population were very limited (about forty killed and less than 150 wounded among the garrison, 4 or 5 dead and 6 wounded among the civilian population), thanks to the wide availability of cave shelters, but the morale was severely undermined by the uninterrupted airstrikes and sleep deprivation in the last days. A call to surrender was sent by the Allies on June 10, but Pavesi did not answer (as he had already done a few days before); on the following day, a flotilla of about fifty British landing craft and other vessels, carrying about 14,000 men, showed up off Pantelleria. At 3:55 on June 11 Pavesi asked Supermarina (the naval headquarters in Rome) for permission to surrender; the request was brought to Benito Mussolini, who - after a consultation with Supermarina and the Supreme Command - decided to authorize it, ordering that the signal of surrender was broadcast at noon of that day, and the yield was to be motivated with the lack of water. Admiral Pavesi, however, did not wait for the permission of Rome, and announced his surrender at 11:00.

Pavesi was interned in a POW camp in the United Kingdom, and was repatriated in November 1944. Meanwhile, in Italy, the admiral was the subject of harsh criticism - especially in the ranks of the fascist regime, and even more, later, in those of Republic of Salò - who accused him of not having opposed the necessary resistance to the Allies, "as the laws of duty and of honor compelled him", if not openly of treason. In May 1944 he was tried and sentenced to death in absentia by a Fascist court in Parma. Pavesi's decision was justified by many by the fact that a resistance to the bitter end would have only resulted in a massacre of the garrison and the civilian population of Pantelleria, without delaying the Allies' plans by more than a few days. More criticism concerned the decision not to order, before the surrender, the destruction of depots, hangars and other military installations on the island, so that they fell intact into enemy hands.

Pavesi resumed service in 1945, at the disposal of the Naval General Staff; in 1946-1947 he was general director of the Naval Crew Corps, then he was assigned to the General Staff for special assignments. He was placed in reserve in 1948 after reaching the age limit, and he was promoted to full admiral in the reserve in 1957. He died in Rome on February 3, 1960.
