= Inigo Campioni =

Italian admiral

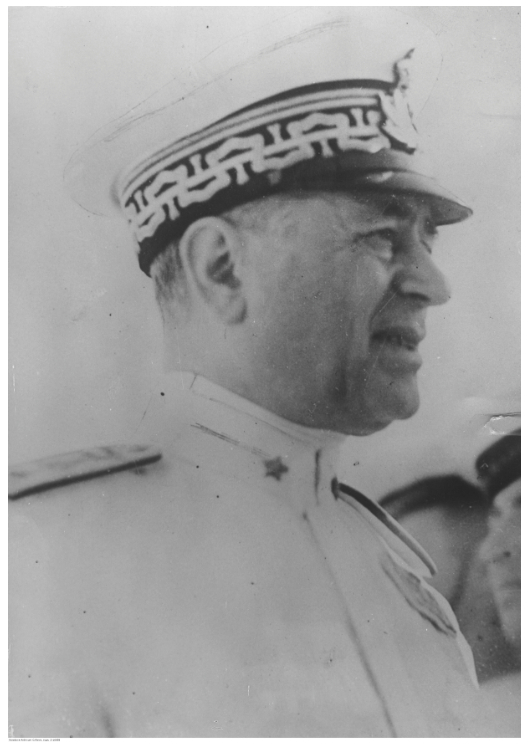

Life Member of the Senate
- In office 1939–1944
- Monarch: Victor Emmanuel III

Personal details
- Born: 14 November 1878 Viareggio, Tuscany, Kingdom of Italy
- Died: 24 May 1944 (aged 65) Parma, Italian Social Republic
- Resting place: Bari, Italy

Military service
- Allegiance: Kingdom of Italy
- Branch/service: Regia Marina
- Years of service: 1896–1944
- Rank: Ammiraglio di squadra (squadron admiral)
- Commands: Ardito (destroyer); Tigre (scout cruiser); Duilio (battleship); Trento (heavy cruiser); 5th Naval Division; 1st Naval Squadron; Italian Aegean Islands
- Battles/wars: Italo-Turkish War; World War I; Adriatic Campaign; Second Italo-Abyssinian War; World War II; Italian invasion of France; Battle of the Mediterranean; Battle of Calabria; Operation Hats; Battle of Taranto; Operation White; Battle of Cape Spartivento; Dodecanese Campaign

Inigo Campioni (14 November 1878 – 24 May 1944) was an Italian naval officer during most of the first half of the 20th century. He served in four wars, and is best known as an admiral in the Italian Royal Navy (Regia Marina) during World War II. He was later executed by the Italian Social Republic for refusing to collaborate.

== Birth and early career ==
Campioni was born in Viareggio, Province of Lucca, Italy, on 14 November 1878. He entered the Italian Naval Academy at Leghorn (Livorno) in 1893. He graduated in 1896 as a guardiamarina (midshipman) and received a promotion to sottotenente di vascello (ship-of-the-line sublieutenant) in 1898 and then to tenente di vascello (ship-of-the-line lieutenant) in 1905.

Campioni participated in the Italo-Turkish War of 1911–1912, serving as an officer aboard the armored cruiser Amalfi.

== World War I ==
World War I began in 1914, and Italy entered the war on the side of Allies in May 1915. Early in the war, Campioni served aboard the battleships Conte di Cavour and Andrea Doria. He was promoted to capitano di corvetta corvette captain in 1916 and became commanding officer of the destroyer Ardito, which under his command escorted numerous convoys to the Adriatic Sea and served with distinction in a naval engagement in the northern Adriatic in September 1917. For the latter action, Campioni received the Bronze Medal of Military Valor. In December 1918, just after the conclusion of the war, he received the War Merit Cross.

== Interwar years ==
After World War I, Campioni was promoted to capitano di fregata (frigate captain) in 1919. He commanded the scout cruiser Tigre from 16 August 1924 to 22 October 1925 and received a promotion to capitano di vascello (ship-of-the-line captain) in 1926. He led naval design programs at the weapons laboratory at La Spezia and became the Italian naval attaché to France in Paris, then from 3 April 1929 to 24 October 1929 he commanded the battleship Duilio. After leaving Duilio, he served a, chief of staff of the First Fleet from 25 October 1929 to 9 May 1930, embarked on the heavy cruiser Trieste. From 10 May 1930 to 16 May 1931 he served as commanding officer of the heavy cruiser Trento.

Campioni achieved flag rank in 1932, being promoted to contrammiraglio (counter admiral), and was promoted again to ammiraglio di divisione (divisional admiral). He served as Chief Cabinet Secretary of the Navy before commanding the 5th Naval Division from 21 September 1935 to 21 September 1936, during the Second Italo-Abyssinian War of 1935–1936.

Campioni was promoted to ammiraglio di squadra (squadron admiral) in 1936 and in 1938 he assumed the post of Deputy Chief of Staff of the Navy. Held in high regard as the most promising officer in the Regia Marina, he became commander of the 1st Naval Squadron — the Italian main battlefleet — on 15 August 1939 with the battleship Giulio Cesare as his flagship. In 1939 he also became a Senator of the Kingdom of Italy.

== World War II ==
=== Mediterranean campaign ===
World War II began when Nazi Germany invaded Poland on 1 September 1939. When Italy entered the war on the side of the Axis powers with its invasion of France on 10 June 1940, Campioni still commanded the Italian battlefleet. He remained in command for the first six months of the Mediterranean naval campaign supporting the invasion of France in June 1940 and then commanding the fleet in operations against the British, including the Battle of Calabria on 9 July 1940, Operation Hats in September 1940, the Battle of Taranto on 11–12 November 1940, Operation White in November 1940, and the Battle of Cape Spartivento on 27 November 1940. Heavily criticized for failing to intercept two British convoys and handling his superior force too cautiously during the latter battle, he was relieved of command on 8 December 1940 — to be succeeded by Angelo Iachino — and returned to the post of Deputy Chief of Staff of the Navy. He did, however, become a Commander of the Military Order of Savoy for his achievements from June 1940 through July 1941.

On 15 July 1941, Campioni was appointed governor of the Italian Aegean Islands (or Italian Dodecanese) and made commander of all Axis armed forces operating in that area. In November 1941, he reached retirement age and was transferred to the naval auxiliary, although he remained on active duty as governor and commander in the Aegean.

=== Dodecanese campaign ===
Campioni was at his headquarters on the island of Rhodes when the armistice between Italy and the Allies was announced on 8 September 1943. He thereafter refused to collaborate with the Axis Powers and oversaw Italian armed resistance to the German conquest of the Aegean Islands that immediately followed the armistice. On 11 September 1943, with German forces advancing and the German Luftwaffe threatening to bomb the city of Rhodes, he signed the surrender of the Italian garrison on Rhodes to German forces, who captured him.

=== Imprisonment and execution ===
The Germans placed Campioni in a prisoner-of-war camp at Schokken (now Skoki) in Poland. In January 1944, they transported him to the northern portion of Italy administered by the Italian Social Republic, a German client regime led by Benito Mussolini, which took custody of him and jailed him at Verona. Campioni refused repeated offers to collaborate with the Italian Social Republic. He based his decision on his view that the Italian Social Republic government was illegal and that Italy's legitimate government remained the Kingdom of Italy, which controlled the southern part of the country and had switched sides and joined the Allies.

As a result of Campioni's stance, an Italian Social Republic military tribunal held a show trial in Parma on 22 May 1944, which became known as the Admirals' Trial. Campioni and Contrammiraglio (Counter Admiral) Luigi Mascherpa were charged with high treason for the supposed crimes of obeying the Italian Badoglio government, which the Italian Social Republic deemed "traitorous" even though King Victor Emmanuel III had appointed it after the fall of the Mussolini government on 25 July 1943, and for mounting an armed defense of the Italian Dodecanese against the German invasion. Influenced by Mussolini, who wanted to point the finger at the Regia Marina as being primarily responsible for the defeat of Fascist Italy, the tribunal sentenced Campioni and Mascherpi after very brief deliberations to death by firing squad. The tribunal downgraded the charge from high treason to "harming the interests of the state", allowing the two admirals to face the more honorable death of being shot in the chest rather than in the back.

The Italian Social Republic offered Campioni a pardon on the condition that he recognize it as Italy's legitimate government, but he rejected the pardon and he and Mascherpa were executed by a firing squad composed of youths aged 17 and 18 in the city square at Parma on 24 May 1944. The Italian Republic posthumously awarded Campioni the Gold Medal of Military Valor in November 1947. He is buried in the military cemetery at Bari, Italy.

== Awards and honours ==
- Grand Officer of the Order of Saints Maurice and Lazarus
- Grand Officer of the Order of the Crown of Italy
- Commander of the Military Order of Savoy (12 January 1942)
- Gold Medal of Military Valor (posthumous)

"As governor and commander of the Armed Forces of the Italian Aegean islands found himself, in the crucial period of the armistice, at the head of one of the most difficult, distant, and vulnerable areas. Having fallen into the hands of the enemy following the occupation of his command headquarters, he repeatedly refused to collaborate with them or in any case to join an illegal government. Tried and condemned by an extraordinary tribunal for having carried out the orders received from the legitimate authorities and for having kept faith with his soldier's oath, he maintained a proud and firm demeanor, refusing to sign the request for mercy and to give even formal membership to the Italian Social Republic, up to the supreme sacrifice of life. He fell while commanding the firing squad himself, after having declared that 'one must know how to offer one's life to one's country at any moment, because there is nothing higher and more sacred than the homeland.' Aegean-Northern Italy, 1941–1944. "
—9 November 1947

- Bronze Medal of Military Valor
- War Merit Cross (for valor)
- War Merit Cross (two awards)
- Maurician Medal (10 lustrums of service)
- Cross for Length of Military Service (Gold Cross for 40 years)
- Commemorative Medal for the Italo-Turkish War 1911–1912
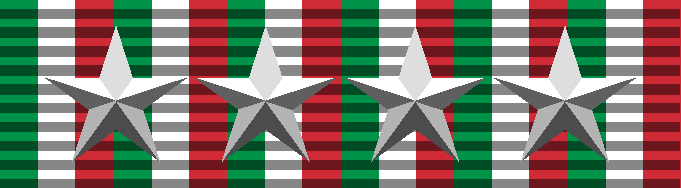
- Commemorative Medal for the Italo-Austrian War 1915–1918 (four years of campaign)
- Commemorative Medal of the Unity of Italy 1848–1918
- Allied Victory Medal

== See also ==
- Battle of the Mediterranean
- Battle of Calabria
- Battle of Taranto
- Operation White
- Battle of Cape Spartivento
- Dodecanese Campaign
- Admirals' Trial
