= Franz Gall (general) =

German Army WW2 general (1884-1944)

- Born: 2 September 1884; Trier, Germany
- Died: 27 December 1944 (aged 60); Mestre, Italy
- Military career
- Allegiance: Nazi Germany
- Branch: Army (Wehrmacht)
- Rank: Generalleutnant
- Commands: "Island fortress Elba"
- Conflicts: Italian Campaign
- Awards: Knight's Cross of the Iron Cross

Franz Gall (2 September 1884 – 27 December 1944) was a German general during World War II, best known as defender of the island fortress Elba.

He was a recipient of the Knight's Cross of the Iron Cross of Nazi Germany. Gall was killed on 27 December 1944 near Mestre, Italy, where he was Commander of the Venice Defense Sector. Franz Gall was promoted to lieutenant general in the Wehrmacht during World War II. He took part in Operation Barbarossa, the Siege of Leningrad, and the campaign in Italy.

He was father of German historian Lothar Gall.

== Awards and decorations ==
- Knight's Cross of the Iron Cross on 19 June 1944 as Generalleutnant and defender of the island fortress Elba
