= Italian destroyer Cesare Battisti =

Destroyer of the Regia Marina

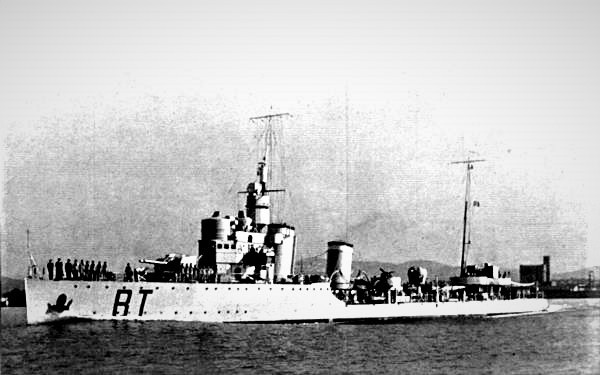
- Cesare Battisti

History

Kingdom of Italy
- Name: Cesare Battisti
- Namesake: Cesare Battisti
- Builder: Odero-Terni-Orlando, Sestri Ponente
- Laid down: 9 February 1924
- Launched: 11 December 1926
- Completed: 13 April 1927
- Fate: Scuttled, 3 April 1941

General characteristics (as built)
- Class & type: Sauro-class destroyer
- Displacement: 1,058 t (1,041 long tons) (standard); 1,600 t (1,570 long tons) (full load)
- Length: 90.16 m (295 ft 10 in)
- Beam: 9.2 m (30 ft 2 in)
- Draught: 2.9 m (9 ft 6 in)
- Installed power: 3 Yarrow boilers; 36,000 shp (27,000 kW)
- Propulsion: 2 shafts; 2 geared steam turbines
- Speed: 31 knots (57 km/h; 36 mph)
- Range: 2,600 nmi (4,800 km; 3,000 mi) at 14 knots (26 km/h; 16 mph)
- Complement: 154–156
- Armament: 2 × twin 120 mm (4.7 in) guns; 2 × single 40 mm (1.6 in) AA guns; 2 × single 13.2 mm (0.52 in) machine guns; 2 × triple 533 mm (21 in) torpedo tubes; 52 mines

Cesare Battisti was one of four Sauro-class destroyers built for the Regia Marina (Royal Italian Navy) in the 1920s. Completed in 1927, she served in World War II.

== Design and description ==
The Sauro-class destroyers were enlarged and improved versions of the preceding Sella class. They had an overall length of 90.16 meters (296 ft), a beam of 9.2 meters (30 ft 2 in) and a mean draft of 2.9 meters (9 ft 6 in). They displaced 1,058 metric tons (1,041 long tons) at standard load, and 1,600 metric tons (1,570 long tons) at deep load. Their complement was 8–10 officers and 146 enlisted men.

The Sauros were powered by two Parsons geared steam turbines, each driving one propeller shaft using steam supplied by three Yarrow boilers. The turbines were rated at 36,000 shaft horsepower (27,000 kW) for a speed of 31 knots (57 km/h; 36 mph) in service, although Cesare Battisti reached a speed of 37 knots (69 km/h; 43 mph) from 41,280 shp (30,780 kW) during her sea trials while lightly loaded. The ships carried enough fuel oil to give them a range of 2,600 nautical miles (4,800 km; 3,000 mi) at a speed of 14 knots (26 km/h; 16 mph).

Their main battery consisted of four 120-millimeter (4.7 in) guns in two twin-gun turrets, one each fore and aft of the superstructure. Anti-aircraft (AA) defense for the Sauro-class ships was provided by a pair of 40-millimeter (1.6 in) AA guns in single mounts amidships and a pair of 13.2-millimeter (0.52 in) machine guns. They were equipped with six 533-millimeter (21 in) torpedo tubes in two triple mounts amidships. The Sauros could also carry 52 mines.

== Construction and career ==
Cesar Battisti was laid down by Odero-Terni-Orlando at their Genoa-Sestri Ponente shipyard on 9 February 1924, launched on 11 December 1926 and commissioned on 13 April 1927.

== Bibliography ==
- Brescia, Maurizio (2012). Mussolini's Navy: A Reference Guide to the Regina Marina 1930–45. Annapolis, Maryland: Naval Institute Press. ISBN 978-1-59114-544-8.
- Fraccaroli, Aldo (1968). Italian Warships of World War II. Shepperton, UK: Ian Allan. ISBN 0-7110-0002-6.
- McMurtrie, Francis E., ed. (1937). Jane's Fighting Ships 1937. London: Sampson Low. OCLC 927896922.
- O'Hara, Vincent P. (2009). Struggle for the Middle Sea: The Great Navies at War in the Mediterranean Theater, 1940–1945. Annapolis, Maryland: Naval Institute Press. ISBN 978-1-59114-648-3.
- Roberts, John (1980). "Italy". In Chesneau, Roger (ed.). Conway's All the World's Fighting Ships 1922–1946. New York: Mayflower Books. pp. 280–317. ISBN 0-8317-0303-2.
- Rohwer, Jürgen (2005). Chronology of the War at Sea 1939–1945: The Naval History of World War Two (Third Revised ed.). Annapolis, Maryland: Naval Institute Press. ISBN 1-59114-119-2.
- Whitley, M. J. (1988). Destroyers of World War 2: An International Encyclopedia. Annapolis, Maryland: Naval Institute Press. ISBN 1-85409-521-8.
