= 320 mm Model 1934 naval gun =

Cannone navale da 320
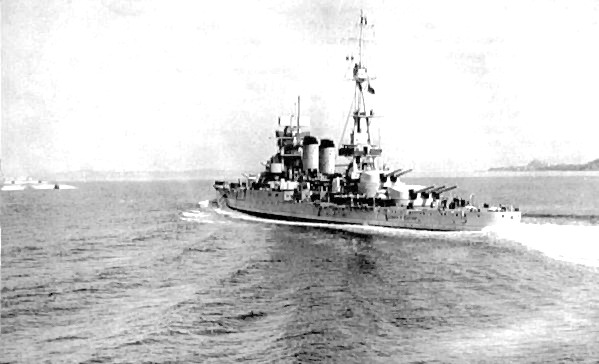
- This photo shows the typical fore-and-aft installation of a twin turret superfiring over a triple turret.
- Type: Naval gun
- Place of origin: Italy

Service history
- In service: 1937 – 1956
- Used by: Regia Marina; Soviet Navy; Italian Navy
- Wars: Second World War

Specifications
- Mass: 64 tonnes
- Barrel length: 14 meters (550 inches)
- Shell: 525 kilograms (1,160 lb)
- Caliber: 320 mm (12.6 in)
- Muzzle velocity: 830 meters per second (2,700 ft/sec)
- Maximum firing range: 30 kilometres (19 mi)

The 320 mm naval gun was the main battery gun used to modernize Italy's World War I battleships for service during World War II. The guns were manufactured by boring out and relining the battleships' original 12"/46 (30 cm) built-up guns and modifying the turrets to increase elevation above the original 20° maximum. Each ship carried two 548-tonne twin turrets and two 745-tonne triple turrets. All guns used pneumatically operated side-swing Welin breech blocks. Each barrel could fire two rounds per minute.

In service these guns chronically suffered of great horizontal dispersion, both from the worsened thermodynamic performance of the guns themselves and from the unequal quality of the shells fired.

== M1934 guns ==
The Conte di Cavour-class battleships Conte di Cavour and Giulio Cesare originally mounted 13 guns as built in 1915 and 1914. These ships were rebuilt between 1933 and 1937 by removing the Q triple turret amidships and replacing guns in triple A turret, twin B and X turrets, and triple Y turret. Conte di Cavour carried Vickers Mk G guns while Giulio Cesare carried Pattern T guns built by Elswick Ordnance Company. Odero Terni Orlando (OTO) re-bored the Vickers guns while the Elswick guns were re-bored by Gio. Ansaldo & C. Maximum gun elevation was increased to 27°.

== M1936 guns ==
The Andrea Doria-class battleships Andrea Doria and Duilio originally mounted 13 guns as built in 1916 and 1915. These ships were similarly rebuilt between 1937 and 1940 by removing Q turret and replacing guns in A, B, X, and Y turrets. Pattern T guns aboard Duilio were similarly rebuilt by Ansaldo while Mk G guns aboard Andrea Doria were rebuilt by OTO. Maximum gun elevation was increased to 30°.

== Ammunition ==
The gun was loaded with four cloth bags each containing 44 kilograms (97 lb) of smokeless powder. High explosive (HE) shells weighed only 458 kilograms (1,010 lb). Anticipated useful barrel life was 150 effective full charges (EFC).
