= Italian ship Cavour =

Conte di Cavour or simply Cavour has been the name of at least two ships of the Italian Navy named in honour of Conte di Cavour and may refer to:

- Italian battleship Conte di Cavour, a Conte di Cavour-class battleship launched in 1911 and sunk in 1945.
- Italian aircraft carrier Cavour, an aircraft carrier launched in 2004.
