= Italian battleship Leonardo da Vinci =

Dreadnought battleship of the Italian Royal Navy

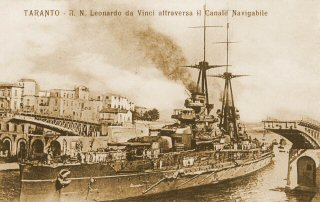
- Postcard of Leonardo da Vinci in Taranto

History

Italy
- Name: Leonardo da Vinci
- Namesake: Leonardo da Vinci
- Builder: Odero, Genoa-Sestri Ponente
- Laid down: 18 July 1910
- Launched: 14 October 1911
- Completed: 17 May 1914
- Fate: Sunk by explosion, 2 August 1916; Refloated, 17 September 1919; Sold for scrapping, 26 March 1923

General characteristics
- Class & type: Conte di Cavour-class battleship
- Displacement: 23,088 long tons (23,458 t) (standard); 25,086 long tons (25,489 t) (deep load)
- Length: 176 m (577 ft 5 in) (o/a)
- Beam: 28 m (91 ft 10 in)
- Draft: 9.3 m (30 ft 6 in)
- Installed power: 20 × water-tube boilers; 31,000 shp (23,000 kW)
- Propulsion: 4 × shafts; 3 × steam turbine sets
- Speed: 21.6 knots (40.0 km/h; 24.9 mph)
- Range: 4,800 nmi (8,900 km; 5,500 mi) at 10 knots (19 km/h; 12 mph)
- Complement: 31 officers and 969 enlisted men
- Armament: 3 × triple, 2 × twin 305 mm (12 in) guns; 18 × single 120 mm (4.7 in) guns; 14 × single 76.2 mm (3 in) guns; 3 × 450 mm (17.7 in) torpedo tubes
- Armor: Waterline belt: 80–250 mm (3.1–9.8 in); Deck: 24–40 mm (0.94–1.57 in); Gun turrets: 240–280 mm (9.4–11.0 in); Barbettes: 130–230 mm (5.1–9.1 in); Conning tower: 280 mm (11 in)

Leonardo da Vinci was the last of three Conte di Cavour-class dreadnoughts built for the Regia Marina (Royal Italian Navy) in the early 1910s. Completed just before the beginning of World War I, the ship saw no action and was sunk by a magazine explosion in 1916 with the loss of 248 officers and enlisted men. The Italians blamed Austro-Hungarian saboteurs for her loss, but it may have been accidental. Leonardo da Vinci was refloated in 1919 and plans were made to repair her. Budgetary constraints did not permit this, and her hulk was sold for scrap in 1923.

== Design and description ==
The Conte di Cavour class was designed to counter the French Courbet-class dreadnoughts which caused them to be slower and more heavily armored than the first Italian dreadnought, Dante Alighieri. The ships were 168.9 meters (554 ft 2 in) long at the waterline and 176 meters (577 ft 5 in) overall. They had a beam of 28 meters (91 ft 10 in), and a draft of 9.3 meters (30 ft 6 in). The Conte di Cavour-class ships displaced 23,088 long tons (23,458 t) at normal load, and 25,086 long tons (25,489 t) at deep load. They had a crew of 31 officers and 969 enlisted men. They were powered by three sets of Parsons steam turbines, two sets driving the outer propeller shafts and one set the two inner shafts. Steam for the turbines was provided by twenty Blechynden water-tube boilers, eight of which burned oil and twelve of which burned both fuel oil and coal. Designed to reach a maximum speed of 22.5 knots (41.7 km/h; 25.9 mph) from 31,000 shaft horsepower (23,000 kW), Leonardo da Vinci only reached a speed of 21.6 knots (40.0 km/h; 24.9 mph) using 32,800 shp (24,500 kW). The ships carried enough coal and oil to give them a range of 4,800 nautical miles (8,900 km; 5,500 mi) at 10 kn (19 km/h; 12 mph).

=== Armament and armor ===
Layout of the main armament

The main battery of the Conte di Cavour class consisted of thirteen 305-millimeter Model 1909 guns, in five centerline gun turrets, with a twin-gun turret superfiring over a triple-gun turret in fore and aft pairs, and a third triple turret amidships. Their secondary armament consisted of eighteen 120-millimeter (4.7 in) guns mounted in casemates on the sides of the hull. For defense against torpedo boats, the ships carried fourteen 76.2-millimeter (3 in) guns; thirteen of these could be mounted on the turret tops, but they could be positioned in 30 different locations, including some on the forecastle and upper decks. They were also fitted with three submerged 450-millimeter (17.7 in) torpedo tubes, one on each broadside and the third in the stern.

The Conte di Cavour-class ships had a complete waterline armor belt that had a maximum thickness of 250 millimeters (9.8 in) amidships, which reduced to 130 millimeters (5.1 in) towards the stern and 80 millimeters (3.1 in) towards the bow. They had two armored decks: the main deck was 24 mm (0.94 in) thick on the flat that increased to 40 millimeters (1.6 in) on the slopes that connected it to the main belt. The second deck was 30 millimeters (1.2 in) thick. Frontal armor of the gun turrets was 280 millimeters (11 in) in thickness and the sides were 240 millimeters (9.4 in) thick. The armor protecting their barbettes ranged in thickness from 130 to 230 millimeters (5.1 to 9.1 in). The walls of the forward conning tower were 280 millimeters thick.

== Construction and service ==
Leonardo da Vinci, named after the artist and inventor, was built by the Odero Shipbuilding Co., at their Sestri Ponente, Genoa shipyard. She was laid down on 18 July 1910, launched on 14 October 1911, and completed on 17 May 1914. The ship saw no combat during the war and spent most of it at anchor. Admiral Paolo Thaon di Revel, the Italian naval chief of staff, believed that Austro-Hungarian submarines and minelayers could operate too effectively in the narrow waters of the Adriatic. The threat from these underwater weapons to his capital ships was too serious for him to actively deploy the fleet. Instead, Revel decided to implement a blockade at the relatively safer southern end of the Adriatic with the battle fleet, while smaller vessels, such as MAS torpedo boats, conducted raids on Austro-Hungarian ships and installations. Meanwhile, Revel's battleships would be preserved to confront the Austro-Hungarian battle fleet in the event that it sought a decisive engagement.

=== Sinking ===
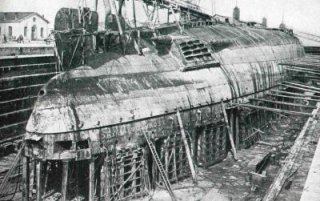
The upside-down hulk of Leonardo da Vinci under repair

She capsized in Taranto harbor, in 11 meters (36 ft) of water, after an internal magazine explosion on the night of 2/3 August 1916 while loading ammunition. Casualties included 21 officers and 227 enlisted men. The subsequent investigation blamed Austro-Hungarian saboteurs, but unstable propellant may well have been responsible.

The Regia Marina wanted to raise the ship and rejected initial plans to demolish the wreck with explosives. They ultimately settled on a plan to make the ship's hull airtight and raise it using compressed air and pontoons. This required that the ship's coal, ammunition, and gun turrets be removed or cut loose, respectively, by divers to reduce her weight. A further complication was that the largest drydock in Taranto had a maximum depth of only 12.2 meters (40 ft) and the upside-down Leonardo da Vinci drew 15.2 meters (50 ft). This meant that her funnels had to be cut off as well.

All of this preparation required over two years and the ship was refloated on 17 September 1919. A deep channel had been dredged from her location to the drydock and she was moved there. A special wooden framework had to be built to support her, still inverted, after the water in the drydock had been drained. Her decks were not designed to handle the stresses involved in her unique situation and had to be reinforced to withstand the weight of the hull and preliminary repairs were made in preparation for righting her. A deep spot in the harbor was dredged for this task and some 400 long tons (410 t) of ballast were added in spots calculated to assist in the righting effort. The primary work was done by 7,500 long tons (7,600 t) of water pumped into the ship's starboard side and she was successfully righted on 24 January 1921. The Regia Marina planned to modernize Leonardo da Vinci by replacing her amidships turret with six 102-millimeter (4 in) anti-aircraft guns, but ultimately lacked the funds to do so and sold her for scrap on 22 March 1923.
