= Italian battleship Andrea Doria =

Battleship of the Italian Royal Navy

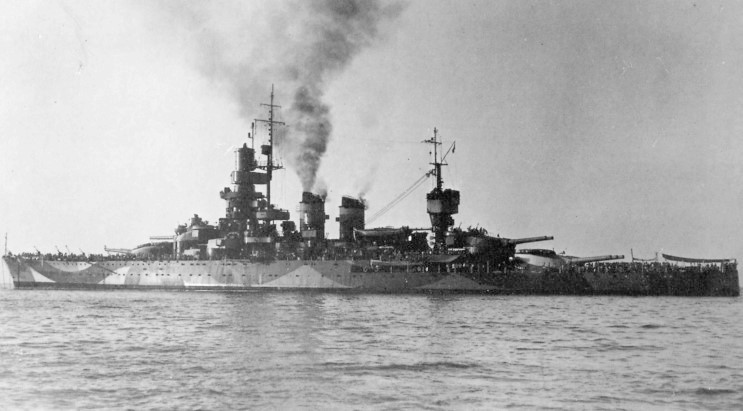
- Andrea Doria after her 1937–1940 reconstruction.

History

Italy
- Name: Andrea Doria
- Namesake: Andrea Doria
- Builder: Arsenale di La Spezia
- Laid down: 24 March 1912
- Launched: 30 March 1913
- Completed: 13 March 1916
- Decommissioned: 16 September 1956
- Stricken: 1 November 1956
- Fate: Scrapped, 1956

General characteristics
- Class & type: Andrea Doria-class battleship
- Displacement: Full load: 24,729 t (24,338 long tons; 27,259 short tons)
- Length: 176 m (577 ft 5 in) (o/a)
- Beam: 28 m (91 ft 10 in)
- Draft: 9.4 m (30 ft 10 in)
- Installed power: 20 × Yarrow boilers; 30,000 shp (22,000 kW)
- Propulsion: 4 × Parsons steam turbine; 4 × screw propellers
- Speed: 21 knots (39 km/h; 24 mph)
- Range: 4,800 nmi (8,900 km; 5,500 mi) at 10 kn (19 km/h; 12 mph)
- Complement: 35 officers; 1,998 enlisted
- Armament: 13 × 305 mm (12 in) guns; 16 × 152 mm (6 in) guns; 13 × 76 mm (3 in) guns; 6 × 76 mm anti-aircraft guns; 3 × 450 mm (17.7 in) torpedo tubes
- Armor: Belt: 254 mm (10 in); Gun turrets: 280 mm (11 in); Deck: 98 mm (3.9 in); Conning tower: 280 mm

Andrea Doria was the lead ship of her class of battleships built by the Regia Marina (Royal Navy). The class included only one sister ship, Duilio. Andrea Doria was named after the 16th-century Genoese admiral of the same name. Laid down in March 1912, the battleship was launched a year later in March 1913, and completed in March 1916. She was armed with a main battery of thirteen 305 mm (12 in) guns and had a top speed of 21 knots (39 km/h; 24 mph).

Andrea Doria saw no major action in World War I, and served extensively in Mediterranean in the 1920s and 1930s. She was involved in the suppression of rebels in Fiume and the Corfu incident in the 1920s. Starting in 1937, Andrea Doria underwent an extensive modernization, which lasted until 1940. She saw relatively little action during World War II; she was tasked with escorting convoys to Libya throughout 1941 and into 1942, during which she engaged in the inconclusive First Battle of Sirte. After the Armistice in September 1943 the ship was sailed to Malta and interned by the Allies. She remained there until 1944, when she was permitted to return to Italian ports. Andrea Doria survived the war and soldiered on in the post-war navy as a training ship until 1956. Paid off in September, she was formally stricken from the naval register on 1 November and sold for scrapping later that year.

== Design ==
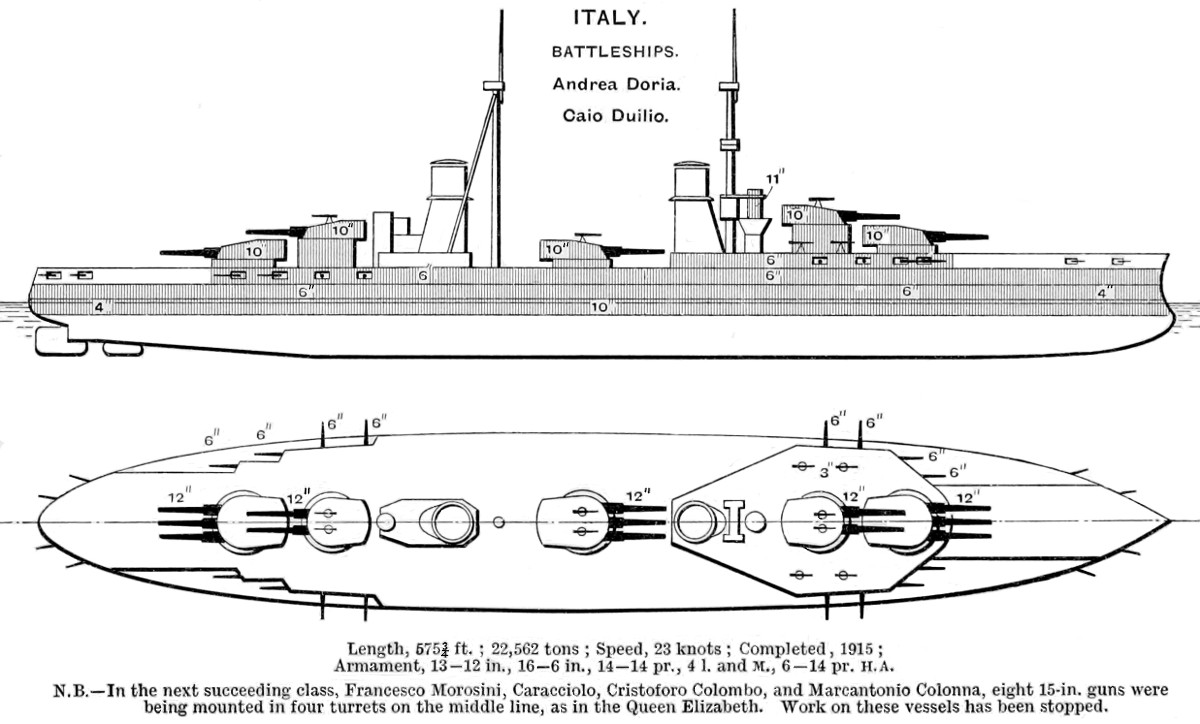
Right elevation and deck plan of the Andrea Doria class.

Andrea Doria was 176 meters (577 ft) long overall; she had a beam of 28 m (92 ft) and a draft of 9.4 m (31 ft). At full combat load, she displaced up to 24,729 metric tons (24,338 long tons; 27,259 short tons). The ship had a forecastle deck that extended for the first third of the hull. Her superstructure consisted of a small, armored conning tower aft of the forward pair of main gun turrets and a second tower aft. As built, she was fitted with two tripod masts. She had a crew of 35 officers and 1,198 enlisted men.

She was powered by four Parsons steam turbines, which drove four screw propellers. Steam was provided by eight oil-fired and twelve coal- and oil-burning Yarrow boilers that were ducted into two large and widely spaced funnels. The engines were rated at 30,000 shaft horsepower (22,000 kW), which provided a top speed of 21 knots (39 km/h; 24 mph). She had a cruising radius of 4,800 nautical miles (8,900 km; 5,500 mi) at a more economical speed of 10 kn (19 km/h; 12 mph).

The ship was armed with a main battery of thirteen 305 mm (12 in) 46-caliber guns in three triple turrets and two twin turrets. The secondary battery comprised sixteen 152 mm (6 in) 45-caliber guns, all mounted in casemates clustered around the forward and aft main battery turrets. Andrea Doria was also armed with thirteen 76 mm (3 in) 50-caliber guns and six 76-mm anti-aircraft guns. As was customary for capital ships of the period, she was equipped with three submerged 450 mm (17.7 in) torpedo tubes.

She was protected with Krupp cemented steel manufactured by Terni. The belt armor was 254 mm (10 in) thick and the main deck was 98 mm (3.9 in) thick. The conning tower and main battery turrets were protected with 280 mm (11 in) worth of armor plating.

=== Modifications ===
Andrea Doria was extensively rebuilt in 1937–1940 at Trieste. Her forecastle deck was extended further aft, until it reached the mainmast. The stern and bow were rebuilt, increasing the length of the ship to 186.9 m (613 ft), and the displacement grew to 28,882 t (28,426 long tons). Her old machinery was replaced with more efficient equipment and her twenty boilers were replaced with eight oil-fired models; the new power plant was rated at 75,000 shp (56,000 kW) and speed increased to 26 kn (48 km/h; 30 mph). The ship's amidships turret was removed and the remaining guns were bored out to 320 mm (12.6 in). Her secondary battery was completely overhauled; the 152 mm guns were replaced with twelve 135 mm (5.3 in) guns in triple turrets amidships. The anti-aircraft battery was significantly improved, to include ten 90 mm (3.5 in) guns, fifteen 37 mm (1.5 in) 54-cal. guns, and sixteen 20 mm (0.79 in) guns. Later, during World War II, four more 37 mm guns were installed and two of the 20 mm guns were removed. After emerging from the modernization, Andrea Doria's crew numbered 35 officers and 1,450 enlisted men.

== Service history ==
Andrea Doria, named for the 16th century Genoese admiral of the same name, was laid down at the La Spezia shipyard in Naples on 24 March 1912. She was launched on 30 March 1913 and completed by 13 March 1916. The Austro-Hungarian Navy, which had been Italy's primary rival for decades, was the primary opponent in the conflict. The Austro-Hungarian battle fleet lay in its harbors directly across the narrow Adriatic Sea and did not emerge for the duration of the conflict. In addition, Admiral Paolo Thaon di Revel, the Italian naval chief of staff, believed that Austro-Hungarian submarines and minelayers could operate too effectively in the narrow waters of the Adriatic. The threat from these underwater weapons to his capital ships was too serious for him to use the fleet in an active way. Instead, Revel decided to implement blockade at the relatively safer southern end of the Adriatic with the battle fleet, while smaller vessels, such as the MAS boats, conducted raids on Austro-Hungarian ships and installations. Meanwhile, Revel's battleships would be preserved to confront the Austro-Hungarian battle fleet in the event that it sought a decisive engagement.

Starting in November 1918, Andrea Doria was based in Taranto. On 10 November, she was sent to Corfu, where she remained until 19 February 1919. She then returned to Taranto, before proceeding to Constantinople in July, departing on the 4th and arriving on the 9th of the month. She joined an Allied fleet in the city and remained there until 9 November, when she returned again to Taranto. In 1920, most of the Italian fleet was temporarily demobilized to provide crews to bring ex-German warships that had been awarded to Italy under the Treaty of Versailles; Andrea Doria was the only battleship to remain operational during the period. In November, the Treaty of Rapallo was signed with the Kingdom of Serbs, Croats and Slovenes. Andrea Doria was sent to remove the rebellious forces of Gabriele d'Annunzio from Fiume that month. On 24 December, she joined the attack on Fiume, and two days later fired three salvos from her 76 mm guns at the destroyer Espero, which had rebelled and joined d'Annunzio. Andrea Doria's gunfire badly damaged Espero. Andrea Doria also shelled d'Annunzio's headquarters and wounded him; he surrendered on 31 December.

During the 1923 Corfu incident with Greece, the Italian Navy, including Andrea Doria, was deployed to occupy the island of Corfu following the murder of Enrico Tellini and four others. Following the peaceful resolution of the incident, Andrea Doria visited Spain. On 16 January 1925, Andrea Doria visited Lisbon to participate in the 400th anniversary of the death of Vasco de Gama. She thereafter went to La Spezia for a refit, which began on 7 February and was completed by June. Following civil unrest in Syria, Andrea Doria steamed to the eastern Mediterranean with a squadron of destroyers in the event that Italian nationals would need to be evacuated. The ships remained docked in Leros until 12 December, by which time the disturbances in Syria had been calmed down. She spent the next six years on normal peacetime duties, until she was withdrawn from service in August 1932. She was placed in reserve in Taranto, with a skeleton crew for maintenance. In March 1937, she started the major reconstruction in Trieste, where she arrived on the 30th. The refit began on 8 April at the Cantieri Riuniti dell'Adriatico shipyard.

=== World War II ===
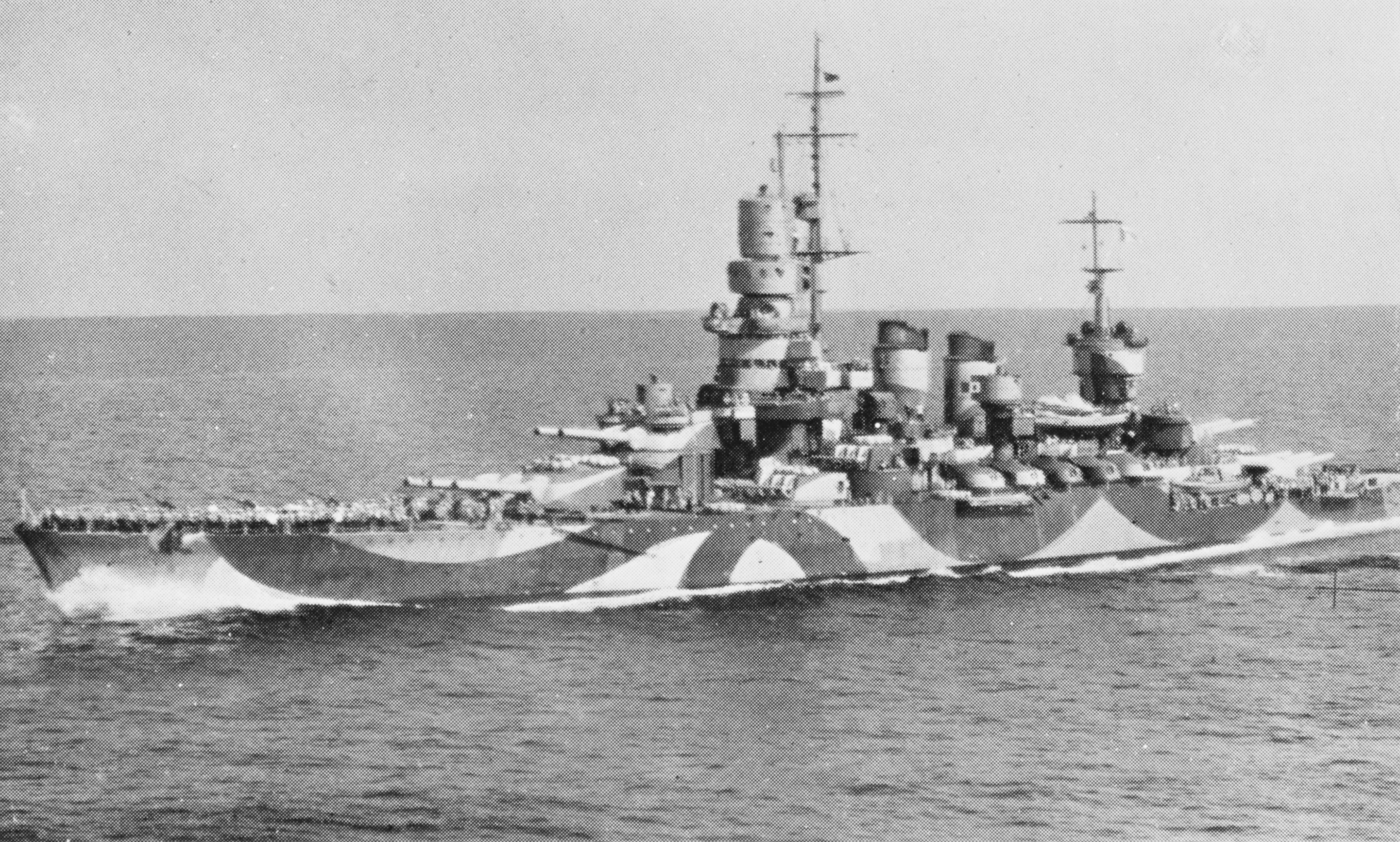
Andrea Doria sailing to Malta for internment, September 9, 1943.

Andrea Doria was still out of service in 1939 when the Second World War broke out in Europe. Work was finished by October 1940, and on the 26th of the month, she rejoined the Italian fleet in the 5th Division in Taranto. She was undamaged by the British attack on Taranto on the night of 11–12 November, and was sent to Naples on the 12th. In early December, the Italian Navy reorganized the fleet; Andrea Doria remained in the 5th Division, along with the battleship Giulio Cesare. She undertook her first operation in early January with the new battleship Vittorio Veneto in response to Operation Excess, a complex series of British convoys to Malta. The Italian battleships were unable to locate any British forces, and so returned to port by 11 January. On 8 February, Andrea Doria sortied again, along with Vittorio Veneto and Giulio Cesare, in response to reports of a British fleet in the area. They were steaming off Sardinia when they received word that the Royal Navy had bombarded Genoa in Operation Grog; they immediately turned north to intercept the British, but failed to locate them in heavy fog.

In December 1941, Andrea Doria formed part of the escort during Operation M41, a major convoy from Italy to Benghazi in Libya on the 13th. M42 followed on 17–19 December, where Andrea Doria saw action against British cruisers and destroyers in the First Battle of Sirte. Late on the 17th, the Italian fleet, commanded by Admiral Angelo Iachino, engaged the British light forces. Both sides acted hesitantly, however, and no decisive engagement resulted. During the battle, the destroyer HMS Kipling suffered some damage from near misses, variably credited to Doria, Cesare or the heavy cruiser Gorizia. Operation M43 followed on 3 January 1942; Andrea Doria again provided escort for the three convoys to Libya. While on the operation, Andrea Doria suffered mechanical problems and had to return to port early. She remained inactive for the remainder of the year, and indeed until the Armistice in September 1943 that removed Italy from the war, owing to severe fuel shortages in the Italian Navy. On 9 September 1943, Andrea Doria left Italy, bound for internment in Malta, where she remained until 8 June 1944. She was then released to return to Sicily, and eventually returned to Taranto on 14 March 1945.

=== Post War Service ===
After the war ended in May 1945, Andrea Doria went to Syracuse, where she remained until 13 December 1949. She was then made flagship of the Italian fleet, a role she performed until 9 December 1950. She held the position again from 9 March 1951 to May 1953, after which time she was used as a gunnery training ship. She was paid off on 16 September 1956, after serving in the Italian Navy for over 40 years. She was formally stricken from the naval register on 1 November and subsequently broken up for scrap in La Spezia.
