= Italian battleship Duilio =

Battleship of the Italian Royal Navy

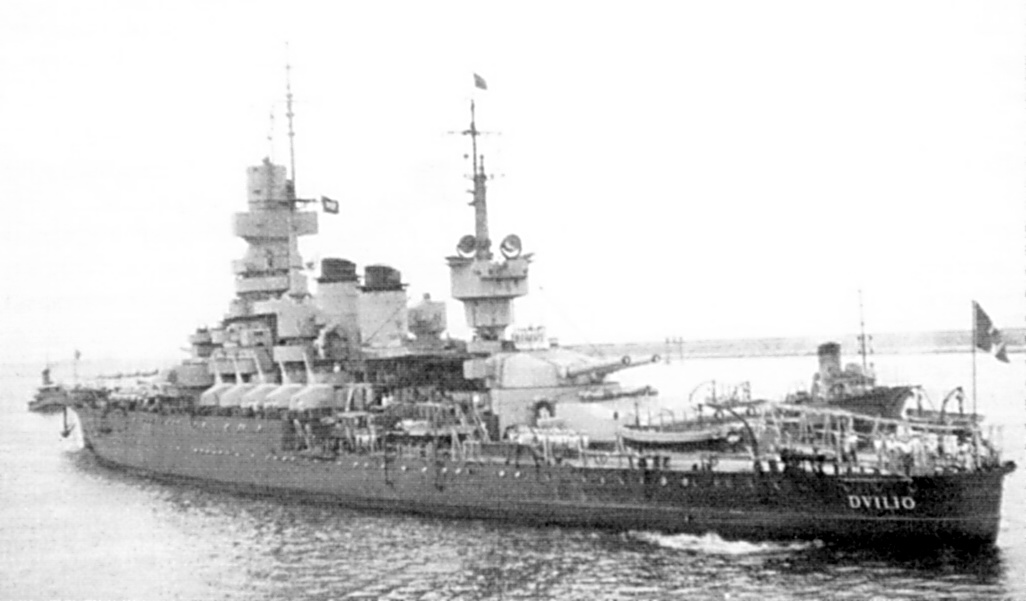
- Italian battleship Duilio in 1948

History

Italy
- Name: Duilio
- Namesake: Gaius Duilius
- Builder: Regio Cantiere di Castellammare di Stabia
- Laid down: 24 February 1912
- Launched: 24 April 1913
- Completed: 10 May 1915
- Stricken: 15 September 1956
- Fate: Scrapped, 1957

General characteristics
- Class & type: Andrea Doria-class battleship
- Displacement: Full load: 24,715 t (24,325 long tons; 27,244 short tons)
- Length: 176 m (577 ft 5 in) (o/a)
- Beam: 28 m (91 ft 10 in)
- Draft: 9.4 m (30 ft 10 in)
- Installed power: 20 × Yarrow boilers; 30,000 shp (22,000 kW)
- Propulsion: 4 × Parsons steam turbine; 4 × screw propellers
- Speed: 21 knots (39 km/h; 24 mph)
- Range: 4,800 nmi (8,900 km; 5,500 mi) at 10 kn (19 km/h; 12 mph)
- Complement: 35 officers; 1,998 enlisted
- Armament: 13 × 305 mm (12 in) guns; 16 × 152 mm (6 in) guns; 13 × 76 mm (3 in) guns; 6 × 76 mm anti-aircraft guns; 3 × 450 mm (17.7 in) torpedo tubes
- Armor: Belt: 254 mm (10 in); Gun turrets: 280 mm (11 in); Deck: 98 mm (3.9 in); Conning tower: 280 mm

Duilio (often known as Caio Duilio) was an Italian Andrea Doria-class battleship that served in the Regia Marina during World War I and World War II. She was named after the Roman fleet commander Gaius Duilius. Duilio was laid down in February 1912, launched in April 1913, and completed in May 1915. She was initially armed with a main battery of thirteen 305 mm (12.0 in) guns, but a major reconstruction in the late 1930s replaced these with ten 320 mm (13 in) guns. Duilio saw no action during World War I owing to the inactivity of the Austro-Hungarian fleet during the conflict. She cruised the Mediterranean in the 1920s and was involved in the Corfu incident in 1923.

During World War II, she participated in numerous patrols and sorties into the Mediterranean, both to escort Italian convoys to North Africa and in attempts to catch the British Mediterranean Fleet. In November 1940, the British launched an air raid on Taranto; Duilio was hit by one torpedo launched by a Fairey Swordfish torpedo bomber, which caused significant damage. Repairs lasted some five months, after which the ship returned to convoy escort duties. A fuel shortage immobilized the bulk of the Italian surface fleet in 1942, and Duilio remained out of service until the Italian surrender in September 1943. She was thereafter interned at Malta until 1944, when the Allies permitted her return to Italian waters. She survived the war, and continued to serve in the post-war Italian navy, primarily as a training ship. Duilio was placed in reserve for a final time in 1953; she remained in the Italian navy's inventory for another three years before she was stricken from the naval register in late 1956 and sold for scrapping the following year.

== Design ==
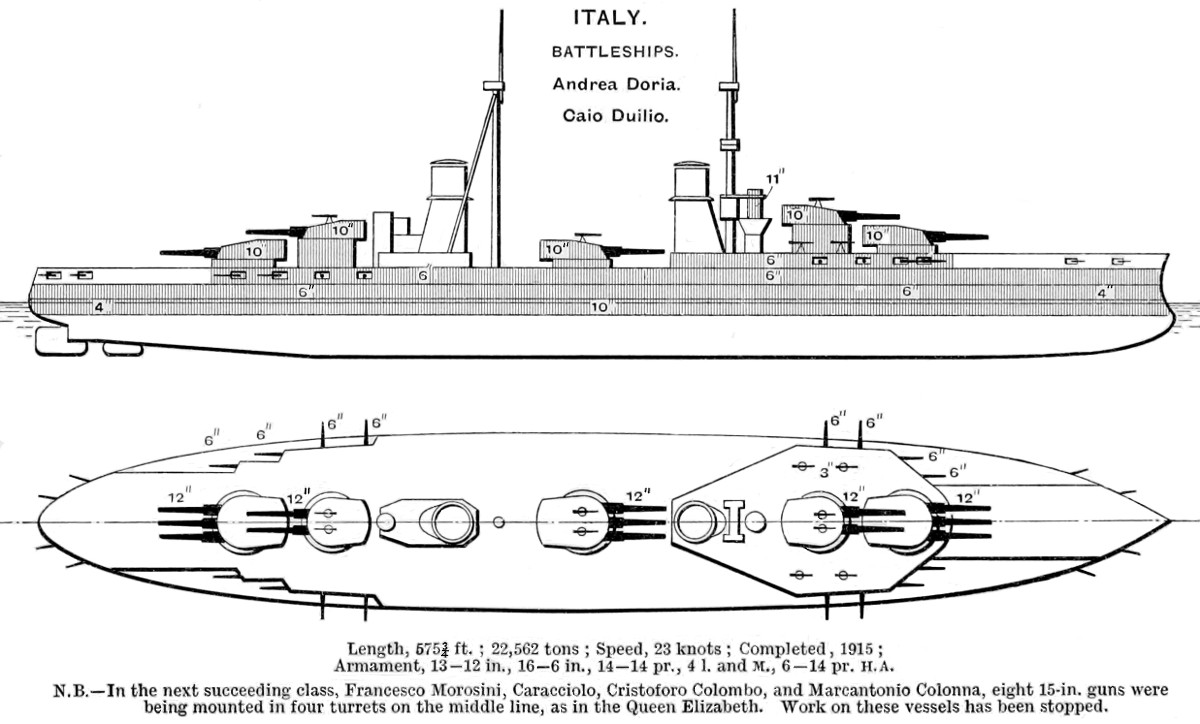
Right elevation and deck plan of the Andrea Doria class.

Duilio was 176 meters (577 ft) long overall and had a beam of 28 m (92 ft) and a draft of 9.4 m (31 ft). At full combat load, she displaced up to 24,715 metric tons (24,325 long tons; 27,244 short tons). The ship had a forecastle deck that extended for the first third of the hull. Her superstructure consisted of a small, armored conning tower aft of the forward pair of main gun turrets and a second tower aft. As built, she was fitted with two tripod masts. She had a crew of 35 officers and 1,198 enlisted men.

She was powered by four Parsons steam turbines, which drove four screw propellers. Steam was provided by eight oil-fired and twelve coal- and oil-burning Yarrow boilers that were ducted into two large and widely spaced funnels. The engines were rated at 30,000 shaft horsepower (22,000 kW), which provided a top speed of 21 knots (39 km/h; 24 mph). She had a cruising radius of 4,800 nautical miles (8,900 km; 5,500 mi) at a more economical speed of 10 kn (19 km/h; 12 mph).

The ship was armed with a main battery of thirteen 305 mm (12 in) 46-caliber guns in three triple turrets and two twin turrets. The secondary battery comprised sixteen 152 mm (6 in) 45-caliber guns, all mounted in casemates clustered around the forward and aft main battery turrets. Duilio was also armed with thirteen 76 mm (3 in) 50-caliber guns and six 76-mm anti-aircraft guns. As was customary for capital ships of the period, she was equipped with three submerged 450 mm (17.7 in) torpedo tubes.

She was protected with Krupp cemented steel manufactured by U.S. Steel. The belt armor was 254 mm (10 in) thick and the main deck was 98 mm (3.9 in) thick. The conning tower and main battery turrets were protected with 280 mm (11 in) worth of armor plating.

=== Modifications ===
Duilio was extensively rebuilt in 1937–1940 at Genoa. Her forecastle deck was extended further aft, until it reached the mainmast. The stern and bow were rebuilt, increasing the length of the ship to 186.9 m (613 ft), and the displacement grew to 28,882 t (28,426 long tons; 31,837 short tons). Her old machinery was replaced with more efficient equipment and her twenty boilers were replaced with eight oil-fired models; the new power plant was rated at 75,000 shp (56,000 kW) and speed increased to 26 kn (48 km/h; 30 mph). The ship's amidships turret was removed and the remaining guns were bored out to 320 mm (13 in). Her secondary battery was completely overhauled; the 152 mm guns were replaced with twelve 135 mm (5.3 in) guns in triple turrets amidships. The anti-aircraft battery was significantly improved, to include ten 90 mm (3.5 in) guns, fifteen 37 mm (1.5 in) 54-cal. guns, and sixteen 20 mm (0.79 in) guns. Later, during World War II, four more 37 mm guns were installed and two of the 20 mm guns were removed. After emerging from the modernization, Duilio's crew numbered 35 officers and 1,450 enlisted men.

== Service history ==
Duilio was laid down at the Regio Cantieri di Castellammare di Stabia on 24 February 1912. She was launched on 24 April 1913, and completed on 10 May 1916. She saw no action in World War I, given the fact that the Austro-Hungarian fleet, Italy's main naval rival, remained in port for the duration of the conflict. In addition, Admiral Paolo Thaon di Revel, the Italian naval chief of staff, believed that Austro-Hungarian submarines and minelayers could operate too effectively in the narrow waters of the Adriatic. The threat from these underwater weapons to his capital ships was too serious for him to use the fleet in an active way. Instead, Revel decided to implement blockade at the relatively safer southern end of the Adriatic with the battle fleet, while smaller vessels, such as the MAS boats, conducted raids on Austro-Hungarian ships and installations. Meanwhile, Revel's battleships would be preserved to confront the Austro-Hungarian battle fleet in the event that it sought a decisive engagement.

As a result, Duilio only went on four patrols during the war, and was operational for a total of 70 hours. She was based at Taranto starting in November 1918 to April 1919, but during that time, she deployed to Corfu, from 10 November 1918 to 26 January 1919. On 26 April 1919, Duilio was sent to Smyrna to help mediate a dispute over ownership of the area. While there, she had a confrontation with the Greek armored cruiser Georgios Averof, but this was defused when the Greeks landed troops to occupy Smyrna. On 9 June, she was relieved by the old pre-dreadnought battleship Roma, allowing her to move to Constantinople.

During her deployment to Turkey, Duilio entered the Black Sea to support the White Russians in the Russian Civil War, from 23 June to 13 July. During this period, she was transferred to the Levant Squadron of the Italian Navy. She returned to Smyrna after completing her deployment to the Black Sea, and remained there until 9 September, when she was relieved by the battleship Giulio Cesare. She returned to Taranto on 12 September, and was placed in reserve. Placed back into service in 1920, Duilio went to Albania on 30 June to support the Italian Army contingent occupying the country, and participated in their withdrawal on 5 September. The following year, she was assigned to the Dodecanese Squadron and cruised in the eastern Mediterranean. She returned to Constantinople as part of an Allied fleet from 27 July to 10 November 1921.

During the 1923 Corfu incident with Greece, the Italian Navy, including Duilio, was deployed to occupy the island of Corfu following the murder of Enrico Tellini and four others. Later that year, she escorted the battleship Dante Alighieri on a state visit to Spain. A magazine explosion on 8 April 1925 wrecked the No. 3 turret's barbette hoist. The ship went into reserve while repairs were effected in La Spezia, which lasted until April 1928. She underwent refitting at Taranto from 18 March to 15 June 1930. She again went into reserve on 11 August 1932 until 11 August 1933, when she was made the flagship of the Commanding Officer, Reserve Fleet. Starting on 19 March 1937, she was taken to Genoa where an extensive reconstruction began at the Cantieri del Tirreno shipyard. The work was completed on 15 July 1940, at which point she was recommissioned into the 5th Division of the 1st Squadron, based in Taranto.

=== World War II ===
Duilio's first wartime patrol took place on 31 August. She and the rest of the fleet sailed to intercept the British battleship HMS Valiant, which was steaming to Alexandria, and a convoy sailing to Malta. The Italian fleet did not have sufficient aerial reconnaissance, which, along with bad weather, prevented the Italians from locating the British forces. They put back in to Taranto on 1 September. Duilio again put to sea on 7 September, in an attempt to catch the British Force H, but the Italian intelligence was faulty, as Force H was in the process of attacking Dakar. Duilio returned to Taranto, where she remained until early November.

==== Attack at Taranto ====
Map showing the disposition of the Italian fleet and the British attacks on Taranto

On the night of 10–11 November, the British Mediterranean Fleet launched a surprise air raid on the harbor in Taranto. Twenty-one Swordfish torpedo bombers launched from the aircraft carrier HMS Illustrious attacked the Italian fleet in two waves. They scored one hit on Duilio, three hits on Littorio, and one on Conte di Cavour. The torpedo hit Duilio on her starboard side; it tore an 11-by-7-meter (36 by 23 ft) hole in the hull and flooded the forward main battery magazines. A water tanker and several smaller craft pushed the battleship aground in shallow water to prevent her from sinking in the harbor. Temporary repairs were effected, and in January 1941, she was refloated and sent to Genoa for permanent repairs, which began on 26 January.

While Duilio was in dock for repairs, the British Force H departed from its normal role as a convoy escort in the western Mediterranean in early February to attack Genoa. Admiral James Somerville's surface ships fired over a thousand shells at the port, and aircraft of the carrier HMS Ark Royal dropped magnetic mines in the harbor. Five ships were sunk, but Duilio was not hit in the attack. During the attack, Duilio's anti-aircraft battery fired some 8,000 rounds at the British spotter aircraft. Repair work was completed by May, and on 16 May she was back in Taranto in the 1st Squadron.

==== Later service ====
Duilio, now the flagship of the Italian fleet, sailed on 29 November to cover an Italian convoy to North Africa. She was escorted by the cruiser Giuseppe Garibaldi and six destroyers. She sailed again on 13 December, to cover the convoy M41; the Italian fleet was forced to break off the convoy escort after Vittorio Veneto was torpedoed. Duilio returned to port on the 14th, and departed to cover the convoy M42 two days later. She was stationed south of Messina with three cruisers and four destroyers. During the convoy operation, British forces attacked, resulting in the First Battle of Sirte, but Duilio's group was too far away to engage the Royal Navy. She returned to Taranto on 19 December. She escorted convoy M43 on 3–6 January 1942, which successfully reached Tripoli unmolested. Convoy T18 followed on 22–5 January, and four of the five transports in the convoy reached Tripoli.

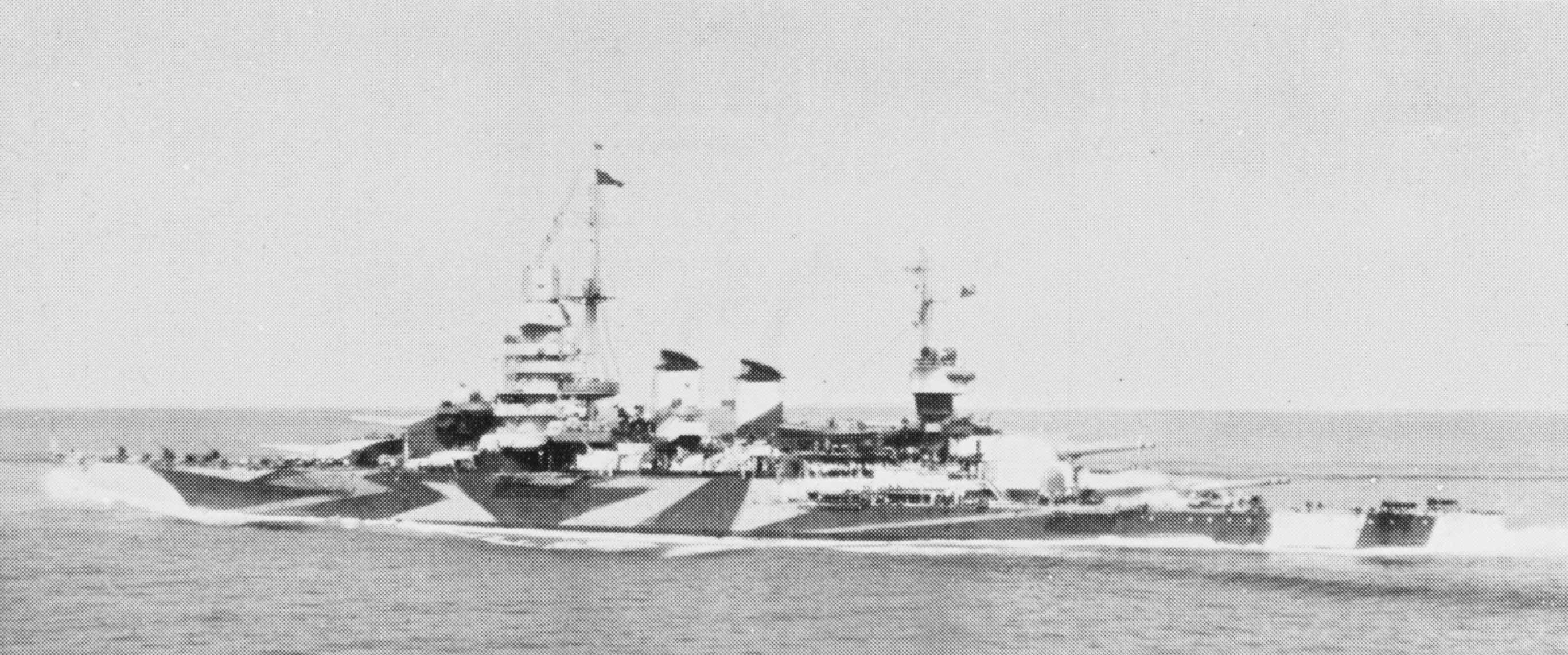
Duilio sailing to Malta for internment, 9 September 1943.

Duilio's next operation was a sortie against the British convoy MW 9 bounded from Alexandria to Malta in February. She departed from Taranto on 14 February with a pair of light cruisers and seven destroyers, but the force could not locate the British ships, and so returned to port. Her mere presence at sea, however, forced the British escort to scuttle the transport Rowallan Castle, previously disabled by German aircraft. On the 21st, she escorted the convoy K7 from Messina and Corfu to Taranto. By this point in 1942, the Italian fleet began to suffer a severe shortage of fuel, which curtailed its operations. The situation was so bad that Duilio had to be placed in reserve and drained of fuel, in order to keep the escort craft operational. She was at Taranto when Italy surrendered to the Allies in September 1943, and on 9 September she was taken to Malta, where she was interned with the rest of the Italian fleet. In June 1944, the Allies allowed Duilio to return to Italian ports; she spent the rest of the war in Taranto, Syracuse, and Augusta.

She survived the war, and continued to serve in the Italian navy; she was the fleet flagship from 1 May 1947 until 10 November 1949, based in Taranto. She was moved to La Spezia in 1953 and removed from active service. Duilio remained there until she was stricken from the naval register on 15 September 1956. She was sold for scrapping the following year.
