= 305 mm/46 Model 1909 =

305 mm /46 Model 1909
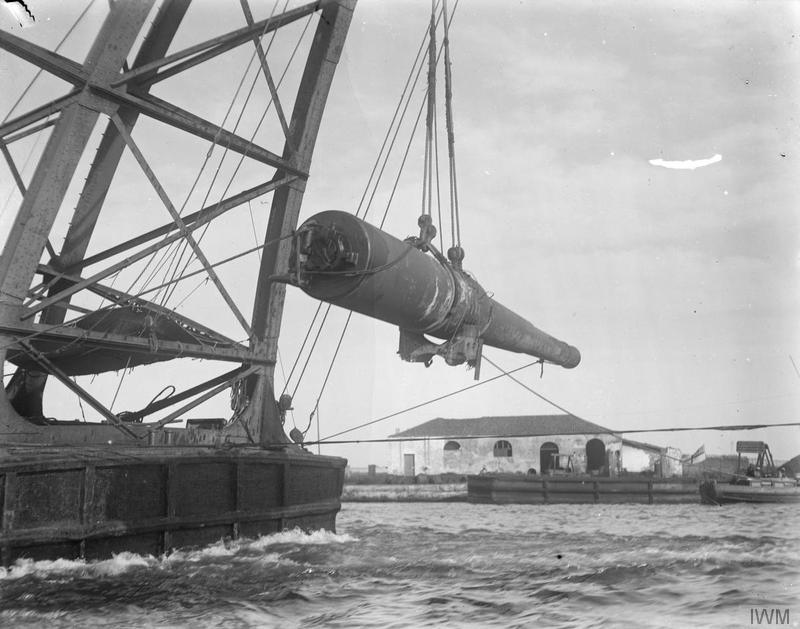
- A gun from the Leonardo da Vinci being recovered.
- Type: Naval gun Coastal artillery
- Place of origin: United Kingdom

Service history
- In service: 1913–1937
- Used by: Italy
- Wars: World War I

Production history
- Designer: Elswick; Vickers
- Designed: 1909
- Manufacturer: Armstrong Whitworth; Vickers
- Produced: 1913
- Variants: Elswick Pattern "T"; Vickers Mk "G"

Specifications
- Mass: Elswick Pattern "T": 69.3 tonnes (68.2 LT); Vickers Mk "G" 63.5 tonnes (62.5 LT)
- Length: 14.5 meters (48 ft)
- Barrel length: 14.02 meters (46.0 ft) 46 caliber
- Shell: Separate loading ammunition
- Shell weight: AP: 417.7 kilograms (921 lb); HE: 401.2 kilograms (884 lb)
- Caliber: 302 millimeters (11.9 in)
- Breech: Welin breech block
- Elevation: -5° to +20°
- Traverse: Dependent on ship and position
- Rate of fire: 2 rpm
- Muzzle velocity: 840 meters per second (2,800 ft/s)
- Maximum firing range: 24 kilometers (15 mi) at +20°

The 305 mm /46 Model 1909 was a naval gun that was the main armament of two classes of Italian dreadnought battleships and one unique dreadnought of the Regia Marina built at the beginning of World War I. Many of these guns were later modified to 320 mm Model 1934 and 320 mm Model 1936 naval guns by boring out their barrels, adding new liners and developing new ammunition. A number of unconverted guns including those from the scrapped Dante Alighieri and the salvaged Leonardo da Vinci were also used as coastal artillery during World War II.

== History ==
There were actually two guns from different manufacturers that were classified as the 305 mm /46 Model 1909. One gun was the Elswick Pattern "T" manufactured by Armstrong Whitworth, while the second was the Vickers Mk "G". Often, no distinction is made between the two guns and the model of gun fitted was not consistent by class of ship; in other words, the two models of gun were carried by different ships within the same class. There were subtle differences in the construction methods used for each gun and their weights were different. However, the guns dimensions were similar, their performance were considered to be equivalent, and both used the same ammunition and powder charges. However, the guns weren't interchangeable. In 1910 the life per barrel was given as 60 full or 200 reduced charges.

== Construction ==
Elswick Pattern “T”: Had an inner A tube, A tube in two parts joined by screwed collar, B tube and half-length wire, jacket and short breech ring. A pneumatically operated Welin breech block was used and they were in hydraulic powered mounts. The Armstrong gun was similar to the Vickers gun, but weighed 69.3 metric tons (68.2 long tons).

Pattern “T” guns were fitted to the following ships:
- Dante Alighieri
- Giulio Cesare – Conte di Cavour-class
- Duilio – Andrea Doria-class

Vickers Mk "G": Was a fully wire-wound type with inner A, A, B tubes, jacket and breech ring. A pneumatically operated Welin breech block was used and they were in hydraulic powered mounts. The Vickers gun was similar to the Armstrong gun, but weighed 63.5 metric tons (62.5 metric tons).

Mk “G” guns were fitted to the following ships:
- Andrea Doria – Andrea Doria-class
- Leonardo da Vinci – Conte di Cavour-class
- Conte di Cavour – Conte di Cavour-class
