= Conte di Cavour-class battleship =

Battleship class of the Italian Royal Navy

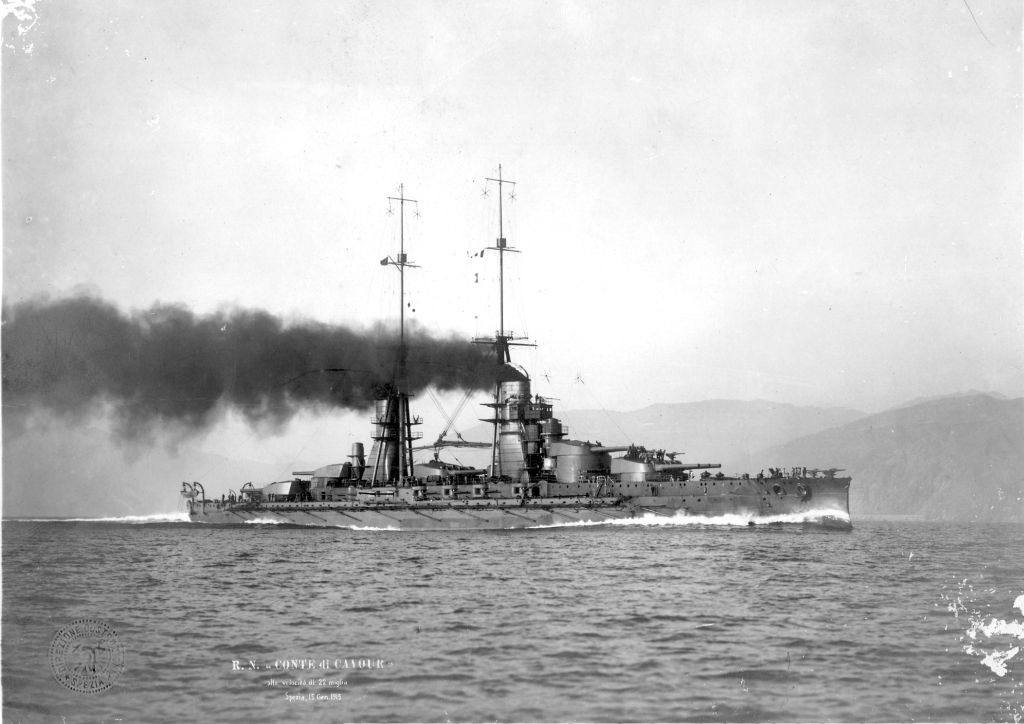
- Conte di Cavour at speed in her original configuration

Class overview
- Name: Conte di Cavour class
- Builders: Arsenale di la Spezia; Cantieri navali Odero; Gio. Ansaldo & C.
- Operators: Regia Marina; Soviet Navy
- Preceded by: Dante Alighieri
- Succeeded by: Andrea Doria class
- Built: 1910–1915
- In commission: 1914–1955
- Completed: 3
- Lost: 1
- Scrapped: 2

General characteristics (as built)
- Type: Dreadnought battleship
- Displacement: 23,088 long tons (23,458 t) (standard); 25,086 long tons (25,489 t) (deep load)
- Length: 176 m (577 ft 5 in) (o/a)
- Beam: 28 m (91 ft 10 in)
- Draught: 9.3 m (30 ft 6 in)
- Installed power: 30,700–32,800 shp (22,900–24,500 kW); 20 × Water-tube boilers
- Propulsion: 4 × Shafts; 4 × Steam turbines
- Speed: 21.5 knots (39.8 km/h; 24.7 mph)
- Range: 4,800 nmi (8,900 km; 5,500 mi) at 10 knots (19 km/h; 12 mph)
- Complement: 31 officers and 969 enlisted men
- Armament: 3 × triple, 2 × twin 305 mm (12 in) guns; 18 × single 120 mm (4.7 in) guns; 14 × single 76.2 mm (3 in) guns; 3 × 450 mm (17.7 in) torpedo tubes
- Armor: Waterline belt: 250–130 mm (9.8–5.1 in); Deck: 24–40 mm (0.9–1.6 in); Gun turrets: 280–240 mm (11.0–9.4 in); Barbettes: 230–130 mm (9.1–5.1 in); Conning towers: 280–180 mm (11.0–7.1 in)

General characteristics (after reconstruction)
- Type: Fast battleship
- Displacement: 29,100 long tons (29,600 t) (deep load)
- Length: 186.4 m (611 ft 7 in)
- Beam: 33.1 m (108 ft 7 in)
- Installed power: 75,000 shp (56,000 kW); 8 × Yarrow boilers
- Propulsion: 2 × Shafts; 2 × Geared steam turbines
- Speed: 27 knots (50 km/h; 31 mph)
- Range: 6,400 nmi (11,900 km; 7,400 mi) at 13 knots (24 km/h; 15 mph)
- Complement: 1,260
- Armament: 2 × triple, 2 × twin 320 mm (12.6 in); 6 × twin 120 mm (4.7 in); 4 × twin 100 mm (4 in) / 47 caliber AA guns
- Armor: Deck: 166–135 mm (6.5–5.3 in); Barbettes: 280–130 mm (11.0–5.1 in)

The Conte di Cavour–class battleships were a group of three dreadnoughts built for the Royal Italian Navy (Regia Marina) in the 1910s. The ships were completed during World War I. In December 1915, and January 1916, when the Serbian army was driven by the German forces under General von Mackensen toward the Albanian coast, 138,000 Serbian infantry and 11,000 refugees were ferried across the Adriatic and landed in Italy in 87 trips by the Conte di Cavour and other ships of the Italian Navy under the command of Admiral Conz. These ships also carried 13,000 cavalrymen and 10,000 horses of the Serbian army to Corfu in 13 crossings from the Albanian port of Vallons. Leonardo da Vinci was sunk by a magazine explosion in 1916 and sold for scrap in 1923. The two surviving ships, Conte di Cavour and Giulio Cesare, supported operations during the Corfu Incident in 1923. They were extensively reconstructed between 1933 and 1937 with more powerful guns, additional armor and considerably more speed than before.

Both ships participated in the Battle of Calabria in July 1940, when Giulio Cesare was lightly damaged. They were both present when British torpedo bombers attacked the fleet at Taranto in November 1940, and Conte di Cavour was torpedoed. She was grounded with most of her hull underwater and her repairs were not completed before the Italian surrender in September 1943. Conte di Cavour was scrapped in 1946. Giulio Cesare escorted several convoys, and participated in the Battle of Cape Spartivento in late 1940 and the First Battle of Sirte in late 1941. She was designated as a training ship in early 1942, and escaped to Malta after Italy surrendered. The ship was transferred to the Soviet Union in 1949 and renamed Novorossiysk. The Soviets also used her for training until she was sunk when a mine exploded in 1955. She was scrapped in 1957.

== Design and description ==
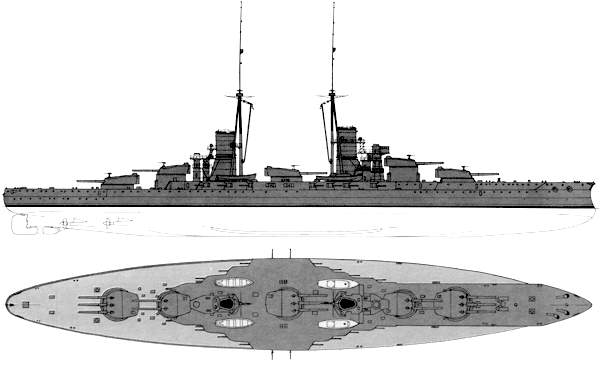
Original configuration

The Conte di Cavour–class ships were designed by Rear Admiral Engineer Edoardo Masdea, Chief Constructor of the Regia Marina, and were ordered in response to French plans to build the Courbet-class battleships. They were intended to be superior to the Courbets and to remedy Dante Alighieri's perceived flaws of weak protection and armament. As upgrading a warship's protection and armament on a similar displacement typically requires a loss in speed, the ships were not designed to reach the 23 knots (43 km/h; 26 mph) of their predecessor. They were still given a 1.5 to 2 knots (2.8 to 3.7 km/h; 1.7 to 2.3 mph) advantage over the 20-to-21-knot (37 to 39 km/h; 23 to 24 mph) standard of most foreign dreadnoughts. Foreign dreadnoughts were being designed with 340-millimeter (13.5 in) guns, but the Regia Marina was forced to use 305-millimeter (12 in) guns in the Conte di Cavours because Italy lacked the ability to build larger guns. An additional gun, making a total of 13, was added to offset this deficiency.

Taking advantage of the lengthy building times of these ships, other countries were able to build dreadnoughts that were superior in protection and armament, with the exception of the French. Construction was delayed by late deliveries of the 305-millimeter guns and armor plates as well as shortages of labor. The Italo-Turkish War of 1911–1912 diverted workers at the shipyards for repairs and maintenance of the ships participating in the war. The Italians imported the raw nickel steel for their armor from America and Britain and processed it into their equivalent of Krupp cemented armor, called Terni cemented, but there were problems with this process and suitable plates took longer to produce than planned.

=== Basic characteristics ===
The ships of the Conte di Cavour class were 168.9 meters (554 ft 2 in) long at the waterline, and 176 meters (577 ft 5 in) overall. They had a beam of 28 meters (91 ft 10 in), and a draft of 9.3 meters (30 ft 6 in). They displaced 23,088 long tons (23,458 t) at normal load, and 25,086 long tons (25,489 t) at deep load. The Conte di Cavour class was provided with a complete double bottom and their hulls were subdivided by 23 longitudinal and transverse bulkheads. The ships had two rudders, both on the centerline. They had a crew of 31 officers and 969 enlisted men.

=== Propulsion ===
The original machinery for all three ships consisted of three Parsons steam turbine sets, arranged in three engine rooms. The center engine room housed one set of turbines that drove the two inner propeller shafts. It was flanked by compartments on either side, each housing one turbine set which powered the outer shafts. Steam for the turbines was provided by 20 Blechynden water-tube boilers in Conte di Cavour and Leonardo da Vinci, eight of which burned oil and twelve of which burned both oil and coal. Giulio Cesare used a dozen each oil-fired and mixed-firing Babcock & Wilcox boilers. Designed to reach a maximum speed of 22.5 knots (41.7 km/h; 25.9 mph), none of the ships reached this goal on their sea trials, despite generally exceeding the rated power of their turbines. They only achieved speeds ranging from 21.56 to 22.2 knots (39.93 to 41.11 km/h; 24.81 to 25.55 mph) using 30,700 to 32,800 shaft horsepower (22,900 to 24,500 kW). The ships could store a maximum of 1,450 long tons (1,470 t) of coal and 850 long tons (860 t) of fuel oil that gave them a range of 4,800 nautical miles (8,900 km; 5,500 mi) at 10 knots (19 km/h; 12 mph), and 1,000 nautical miles (1,900 km; 1,200 mi) at 22 knots (41 km/h; 25 mph). Each ship was equipped with three turbo generators that provided a total of 150 kilowatts at 110 volts.

=== Armament ===
As built, the ships' main armament comprised thirteen 46-caliber long 305-mm Model 1909 guns, designed and built by Armstrong Whitworth and Vickers, in five gun turrets. The turrets were all on the centerline, with a twin-gun turret superfiring over a triple-gun turret in fore and aft pairs, and a third triple turret amidships, designated 'A', 'B', 'Q', 'X', and 'Y' from bow to stern. This was only one fewer gun than the Brazilian Rio de Janeiro then under construction, the most heavily armed battleship in the world; Rio de Janeiro's guns were mounted in seven twin-gun turrets. The turrets had an elevation capability of −5° to +20 degrees and the ships could carry 100 rounds for each gun, although 70 was the normal load. Sources disagree regarding these guns' performance, but naval historian Giorgio Giorgerini claims that they fired 452-kilogram (996 lb) armor-piercing (AP) projectiles at the rate of one round per minute and that they had a muzzle velocity of 840 m/s (2,800 ft/s) which gave a maximum range of 24,000 m (26,000 yd). (Note: Friedman provides a variety of sources that show armor-piercing shell weights ranging from 416.92 to 452.32 kg (919.16 to 997.2 lb) and muzzle velocities around 861 m/s (2,820 ft/s).) The turrets had hydraulic training and elevation, with an auxiliary electric system.

The secondary armament on the first two ships consisted of eighteen 50-caliber 120 mm (4.7 in) M1909 guns, also designed by Armstrong Whitworth and Vickers, mounted in casemates on the sides of the hull. These guns could depress to −10 degrees and had a maximum elevation of +15 degrees; they had a rate of fire of six shots per minute. They could fire a 22.1-kilogram (49 lb) high-explosive projectile with a muzzle velocity of 850 m/s (2,800 ft/s) to a maximum distance of 11,000 m (12,000 yd). The ships carried a total of 3,600 rounds for them. For defense against torpedo boats, the ships carried fourteen British built 50-caliber 3 in (76 mm) guns; thirteen of these could be mounted on the turret tops, but they could be mounted in 30 different positions, including some on the forecastle and upper decks. These guns had the same range of elevation as the secondary guns, and their rate of fire was higher at 10 rounds per minute. They fired a 6.4 kg (14 lb) AP projectile with a muzzle velocity of 815 m/s (2,670 ft/s) to a maximum distance of 9,100 m (10,000 yd). The ships were also fitted with three submerged 45 cm (17.7 in) torpedo tubes, one on each broadside and the third in the stern.

=== Armor ===
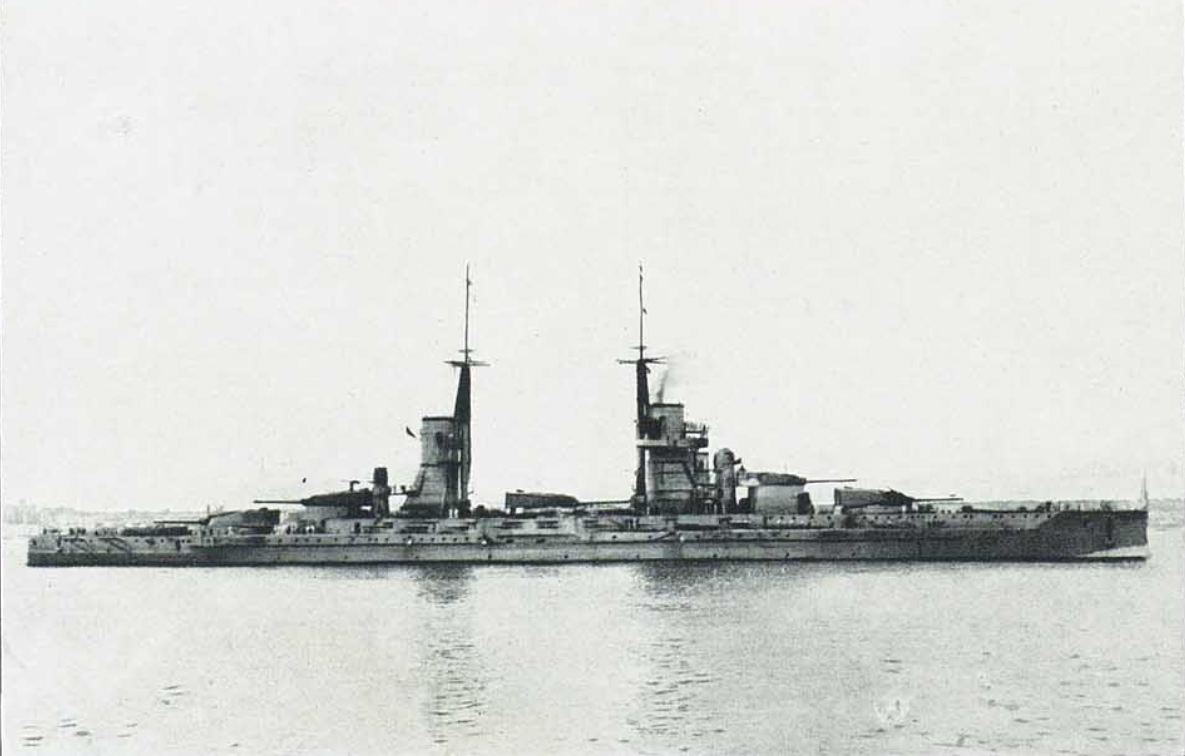
A Conte di Cavour-class battleship during World War I

The Conte di Cavour-class ships had a complete waterline armor belt that was 2.8 m (9 ft 2 in) high; 1.6 m (5 ft 3 in) of this was below the waterline and 1.2 m (3 ft 11 in) above. It had a maximum thickness of 250 mm (9.8 in) amidships, reducing to 130 mm (5.1 in) towards the stern and 80 mm (3.1 in) towards the bow. The lower edge of this belt was a uniform 170 mm (6.7 in) in thickness. Above the main belt was a strake of armor 220 mm (8.7 in) thick that extended 2.3 m (7 ft 7 in) up to the lower edge of the main deck. Above this strake was a thinner one, 130 millimeters thick, that extended 138 m (452 ft 9 in) from the bow to 'X' turret. The upper strake of armor protected the casemates and was 110 mm (4.3 in) thick. The ships had two armored decks: the main deck was 24 mm (0.94 in) thick in two layers on the flat that increased to 40 mm (1.6 in) on the slopes that connected it to the main belt. The second deck was 30 mm (1.2 in) thick, also in two layers. Fore and aft transverse bulkheads connected the armored belt to the decks.

The frontal armor of the gun turrets was 280 mm (11.0 in) in thickness with 240 mm (9.4 in) thick sides, and an 85 mm (3.3 in) roof and rear. Their barbettes also had 230-millimeter armor above the forecastle deck that reduced to 180 mm (7.1 in) between the forecastle and upper decks and 130 millimeters below the upper deck. The forward conning tower had walls 280 mm thick; those of the aft conning tower were 180 millimeters thick. The total weight of the protective armor was 5,150 long tons (5,230 t), just over 25 per cent of the ships' designed displacement. The total weight of the entire protective system was 6,122 long tons (6,220 t), 30.2 per cent of their intended displacement.

== Modifications and reconstruction ==
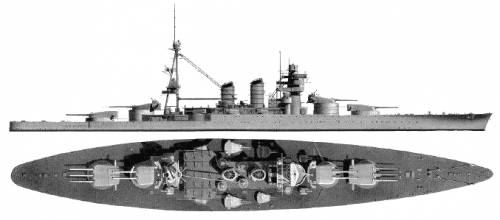
Office of Naval Intelligence drawing of the Conte di Cavour class, January 1943

Shortly after the end of World War I, the number of 50-caliber 76 mm guns was reduced to 13, all mounted on the turret tops, and six new 40-caliber 76-mm Model 1916 anti-aircraft (AA) guns were installed abreast the aft funnel. In addition two license-built QF 2-pounder (40 mm) AA guns were mounted on the forecastle deck abreast 'B' turret. In 1925–1926 the foremast was replaced by a tetrapodal mast, which was moved forward of the funnels, the rangefinders were upgraded, and the ships were equipped to handle a Macchi M.18 seaplane mounted on the center turret. Around that same time, one or both of the ships was equipped with a fixed aircraft catapult on the port side of the forecastle. (Note: Sources disagree if Giulio Cesare was fitted with a catapult or not. Giorgerini says both ships were so equipped; Whitley, Bagnasco & Grossman and Bargoni & Gay say that only Conte di Cavour received one.)

The sisters began an extensive reconstruction program directed by Vice Admiral (Generale del Genio navale) Francesco Rotundi in October 1933. This lasted until June 1937 for Conte di Cavour and October 1937 for Giulio Cesare, and resulted in several changes. A new bow section was grafted over the existing bow which increased their length by 10.31 m (33 ft 10 in) to 186.4 m (611 ft 7 in) and their beam increased to 28.6 m (93 ft 10 in). Their draft at deep load increased to 10.02 m (32 ft 10 in) for Conte di Cavour and 10.42 m (34 ft 2 in) for Giulio Cesare. All of the changes made during their reconstruction increased their displacement to 26,140 long tons (26,560 t) at standard load and 29,100 long tons (29,600 t) at deep load. The ships' crews increased to 1,260 officers and enlisted men. Only 40% of the original ship's structure remained after the reconstruction was completed. Two of the propeller shafts were removed and the existing turbines were replaced by two Belluzzo geared steam turbines rated at 75,000 shp (56,000 kW). The boilers were replaced by eight superheated Yarrow boilers with a working pressure of 22 atm (2,229 kPa; 323 psi). On her sea trials in December 1936, before her reconstruction was fully completed, Giulio Cesare reached a speed of 28.24 knots (52.30 km/h; 32.50 mph) from 93,430 shp (69,670 kW). In service their maximum speed was about 27 knots (50 km/h; 31 mph). The ships now carried 2,550–2,605 long tons (2,591–2,647 t) of fuel oil which provided them with a range of 6,400 nautical miles (11,900 km; 7,400 mi) at a speed of 13 knots (24 km/h; 15 mph).

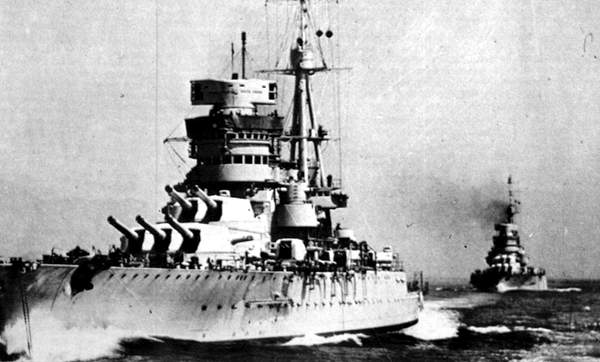
Giulio Cesare leading her sister after their reconstruction

The center turret and the torpedo tubes were removed and all of the existing secondary armament and AA guns were replaced by a dozen 120-mm OTO 1933 guns in six twin-gun turrets and eight 102 mm (4 in) AA guns in twin turrets. In addition the ships were fitted with a dozen Breda 37 mm (1.5 in) 54-caliber light AA guns in six twin-gun mounts and twelve 13.2 mm (0.52 in) Breda M31 anti-aircraft machine guns, also in twin mounts. The 305 mm (12 in) guns were bored out to 320 mm (12.6 in) and their turrets were modified to use electric power, a fixed loading angle of +12 degrees, and the guns could now elevate to +27 degrees. The 320 mm AP shells weighed 525 kg (1,157 lb) and had a maximum range of 28,600 m (31,300 yd) with a muzzle velocity of 830 m/s (2,700 ft/s). In 1940 the 13.2 mm machine guns were replaced by 65-caliber 20 mm (0.79 in) Breda Model 35 AA guns in twin mounts. Giulio Cesare received two more twin mounts as well as four additional 37 mm guns in twin mounts on the forecastle between the two turrets in 1941. The tetrapodal mast was replaced with a new forward conning tower, protected with 260 mm (10.2 in) thick armor. Atop the conning tower there was a director fitted with two rangefinders, with a base length of 7.2 m (23.6 ft).

The deck armor was increased during reconstruction to a total of 135 mm (5.3 in) over the engine and boiler rooms and 166 mm (6.5 in) over the magazines, although its distribution over three decks, each with multiple layers, meant that it was considerably less effective than a single plate of the same thickness. The armor protecting the barbettes was reinforced with 50 mm (2.0 in) plates. All this armor weighed a total of 3,227 long tons (3,279 t).

The existing underwater protection was replaced by the Pugliese system that consisted of a large cylinder surrounded by fuel oil or water that was intended to absorb the blast of a torpedo warhead. It lacked enough depth to be fully effective against contemporary torpedoes. A major problem of the reconstruction was that the ships' increased draft meant that their waterline armor belt was almost completely submerged with any significant load.

== Ships ==
Construction data
Ship	Namesake	Builder	Laid down	Launched	Completed	Fate
Conte di Cavour	Camillo Benso, Count of Cavour	La Spezia Arsenale, La Spezia	10 August 1910	10 August 1911	1 April 1915	Sunk during the Battle of Taranto 12 November 1940; salvaged 1941; scrapped 1946
Giulio Cesare	Julius Caesar	Gio. Ansaldo & C., Genoa	24 June 1910	15 October 1911	14 May 1914	Transferred to the Soviet Union, 1949; sank 29 October 1955 after hitting a mine; salvaged and scrapped, 1957
Leonardo da Vinci	Leonardo da Vinci	Odero, Genoa-Sestri Ponente	18 July 1910	14 October 1911	17 May 1914	Sunk by magazine explosion, 2 August 1916; salvaged 1919; sold for scrap, 22 March 1923

== Service ==
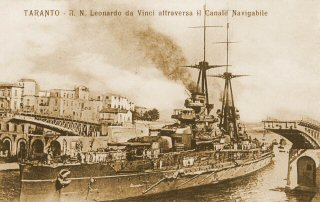
Postcard of Leonardo da Vinci in Taranto

Conte di Cavour and Giulio Cesare served as flagships in the southern Adriatic Sea during World War I, but saw no action and spent little time at sea. Leonardo da Vinci was also little used and was sunk by an internal magazine explosion at Taranto harbor on the night of 2/3 August 1916 while loading ammunition. Casualties included 21 officers and 227 enlisted men killed. The Italians blamed Austro-Hungarian saboteurs, but unstable propellant may well have been responsible. The ship was refloated, upside down, on 17 September 1919 and righted on 24 January 1921. The Regia Marina planned to modernize her by replacing her center turret with six 102-millimeter (4 in) AA guns, but lacked the funds to do so and sold her for scrap on 22 March 1923.

In 1919, Conte di Cavour sailed to North America and visited ports in the United States as well as Halifax, Canada. Giulio Cesare made port visits in the Levant in 1919 and 1920. Conte di Cavour was mostly inactive in 1921 because of personnel shortages and was refitted at La Spezia from November to March 1922. Both battleships supported Italian operations on Corfu in 1923 after an Italian general and his staff were murdered on the Greco-Albanian border; Benito Mussolini was not satisfied with the Greek Government's response so he ordered Italian troops to occupy the island. Conte di Cavour bombarded the town with her 76 mm guns, killing 20 and wounding 32 civilians.

Conte di Cavour escorted King Victor Emmanuel III and his wife aboard Dante Alighieri, on a state visit to Spain in 1924 and was placed in reserve upon her return until 1926, when she conveyed Mussolini on a voyage to Libya. The ship was again placed in reserve from 1927 until 1933. Her sister became a gunnery training ship in 1928, after having been in reserve since 1926. Conte di Cavour was reconstructed at the CRDA Trieste Yard while Giulio Cesare was rebuilt at Cantieri del Tirreno, Genoa between 1933 and 1937. Both ships participated in a naval review by Adolf Hitler in the Bay of Naples in May 1938 and covered the invasion of Albania in May 1939.

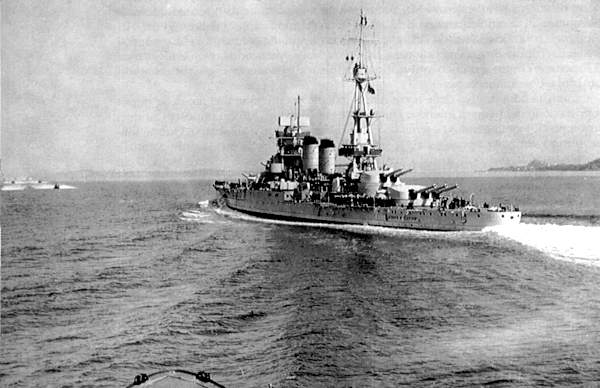
Conte di Cavour in Naples, 5 May 1938

Early in World War II, the sisters took part in the Battle of Calabria (also known as the Battle of Punta Stilo) on 9 July 1940, as part of the 1st Battle Squadron, commanded by Admiral Inigo Campioni, during which they engaged major elements of the British Mediterranean Fleet. The British were escorting a convoy from Malta to Alexandria, while the Italians had finished escorting another from Naples to Benghazi, Libya. Admiral Andrew Cunningham, commander of the Mediterranean Fleet, attempted to interpose his ships between the Italians and their base at Taranto. Crew on the fleets spotted each other in the middle of the afternoon and the Italian battleships opened fire at 15:53 at a range of nearly 27,000 meters (29,000 yd). The two leading British battleships, HMS Warspite and Malaya, replied a minute later. Three minutes after she opened fire, shells from Giulio Cesare began to straddle Warspite which made a small turn and increased speed, to throw off the Italian ship's aim, at 16:00. At that same time, a shell from Warspite struck Giulio Cesare at a distance of about 24,000 meters (26,000 yd). The shell pierced the rear funnel and detonated inside it, blowing out a hole nearly 6.1 meters (20 ft) across. Fragments started several fires and their smoke was drawn into the boiler rooms, forcing four boilers off-line as their operators could not breathe. This reduced the ship's speed to 18 knots (33 km/h; 21 mph). Uncertain how severe the damage was, Campioni ordered his battleships to turn away in the face of superior British numbers and they successfully disengaged. Repairs to Giulio Cesare were completed by the end of August and both ships unsuccessfully attempted to intercept British convoys to Malta in August and September.

On the night of 11 November 1940, Conte di Cavour and Giulio Cesare were at anchor in Taranto harbor when they were attacked by 21 Fairey Swordfish torpedo bombers from the British aircraft carrier HMS Illustrious, along with several other warships. One torpedo exploded underneath 'B' turret at 23:15, and her captain requested tugboats to help ground the ship on a nearby 12-meter (39 ft) sandbank. His admiral vetoed the request until it was too late and Conte di Cavour had to use a deeper, 17-meter (56 ft), sandbank at 04:30 on 12 November. In an effort to lighten the ship, her guns and parts of her superstructure were removed and Conte di Cavour was refloated on 9 June 1941. Temporary repairs to enable the ship to reach Trieste for permanent repairs took until 22 December. Her guns were operable by September 1942, but replacing her entire electrical system took longer and she was still under repair when Italy surrendered a year later. The Regia Marina made plans to replace her secondary and anti-aircraft weapons with a dozen 135-millimeter (5.3 in) dual-purpose guns in twin mounts, twelve 64-caliber 65-millimeter (2.6 in), and twenty-three 65-caliber 20 mm AA guns. Her hulk was damaged in an air raid and capsized on 23 February 1945. Refloated shortly after the end of the war, Conte di Cavour was scrapped in 1946.

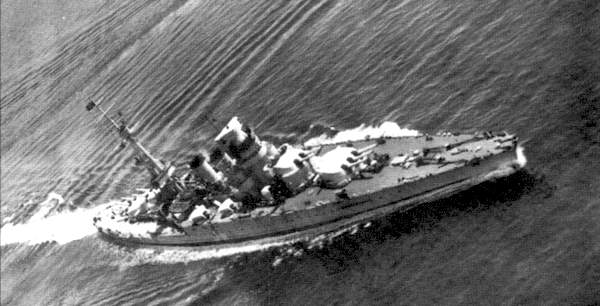
Aerial view of Conte di Cavour after her reconstruction

Giulio Cesare participated in the Battle of Cape Spartivento on 27 November 1940, but never got close enough to any British ships to fire at them. The ship was damaged in January 1941 by a near miss during an air raid on Naples; repairs were completed in early February. She participated in the First Battle of Sirte on 17 December 1941, providing distant cover for a convoy bound for Libya, again never firing her main armament. In early 1942, Giulio Cesare was reduced to a training ship at Taranto and later Pola. She steamed to Malta in early September 1943 after the Italian surrender. The German submarine U-596 unsuccessfully attacked the ship in the Gulf of Taranto in early March 1944.

After the war, Giulio Cesare was allocated to the Soviet Union as war reparations in 1949, and renamed Novorossiysk, after the Soviet city on the Black Sea. The Soviets used her as a training ship when she was not undergoing one of her eight refits in their hands. In 1953, all remaining Italian light AA guns were replaced by eighteen 37 mm 70-K AA guns in six twin mounts and six singles. They also replaced her fire-control systems and added radars, although the exact changes are unknown. The Soviets intended to rearm her with their own 305 mm guns, but this was forestalled by her loss. While at anchor in Sevastopol on the night of 28/29 October 1955, she detonated a large German mine left over from World War II. The explosion blew a hole completely through the ship, making a 4-by-14-meter (13 by 46 ft) hole in the forecastle forward of 'A' turret. The flooding could not be controlled and she later capsized with the loss of 608 men. Novorossiysk was stricken from the Navy List on 24 February 1956, salvaged on 4 May 1957, and subsequently scrapped.
