= QF 14-pounder naval gun Mk I & II =

Ordnance QF 14-pounder Mk I & II
- Type: Naval gun
- Place of origin: United Kingdom

Service history
- In service: 1904-19??
- Used by: Royal Navy; Regia Marina
- Wars: World War I

Production history
- Designer: Vickers
- Designed: 1909
- Manufacturer: Elswick Ordnance Company (Mk I); Vickers, Sons and Maxim (Mk II)

Specifications
- Mass: 1,904–2,016 lb (864–914 kg)
- Barrel length: 150 in (3.8 m) (bore) (50 calibres)
- Shell: QF British: 12.5 lb (5.67 kg); QF Italian: 14.1 lb (6.40 kg)
- Calibre: 3 in (76.2 mm)
- Rate of fire: 10 rpm
- Muzzle velocity: British: 2,548 ft/s (777 m/s); Italian: 3,051 ft/s (930 m/s)

The QF 14-pounder Mk I & II was a 3-inch high-velocity naval gun used to equip battleships for defence against torpedo boats. It was produced for export by Elswick Ordnance Company (Mk I) and Vickers, Sons and Maxim (Mk II). In Royal Navy service they were modified to use the standard 12-pounder shell, while the Italian Regia Marina used the original 14-pounder shells.

== Service ==
- The gun equipped the two Swiftsure-class pre-dreadnought battleships built in Britain for Chile and purchased by the UK in 1903 before completion.
- The gun also equipped the three Conte di Cavour-class dreadnought battleships of the Regia Marina.
- The gun also equipped the two Andrea Doria-class dreadnought battleships of the Regia Marina.
- The gun also equipped the two Pisa-class armored cruisers of the Regia Marina.

== British ammunition ==
In British service the guns fired the same 3-inch, 12.5 lb shell as QF 12-pounder guns.

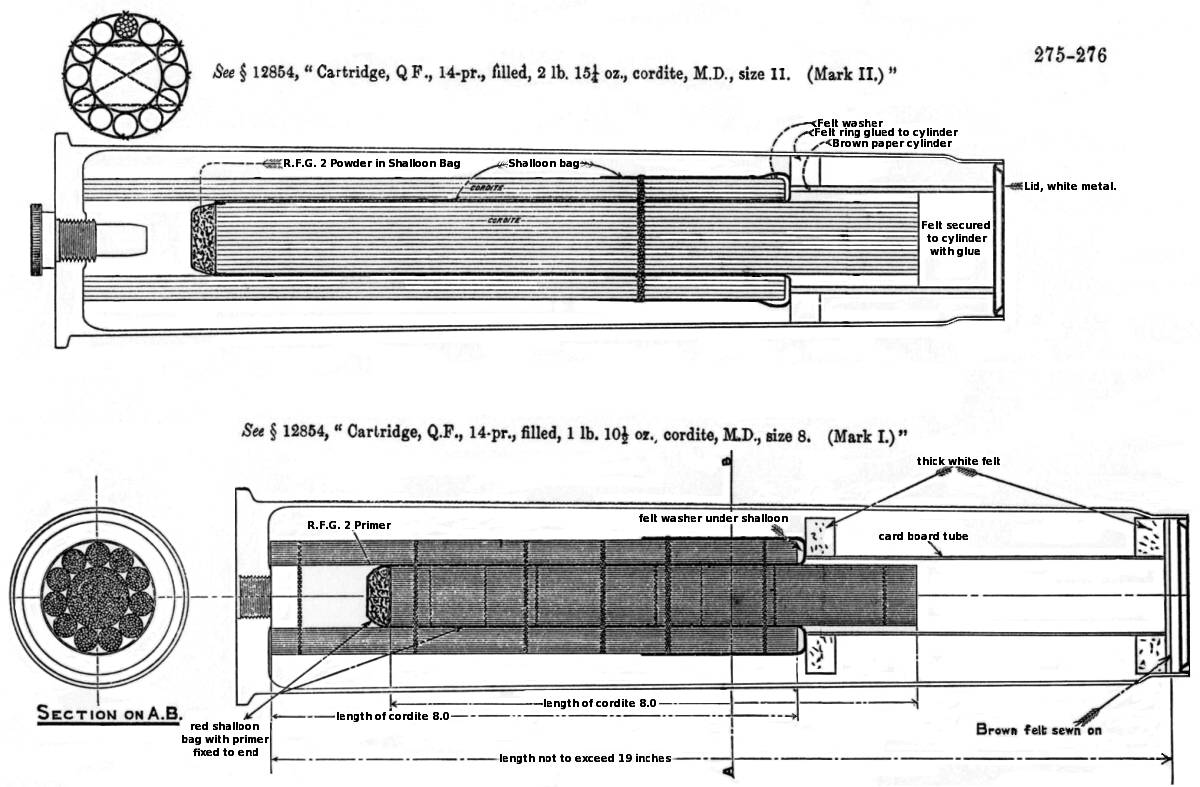
Cordite Cartridges circa. 1905

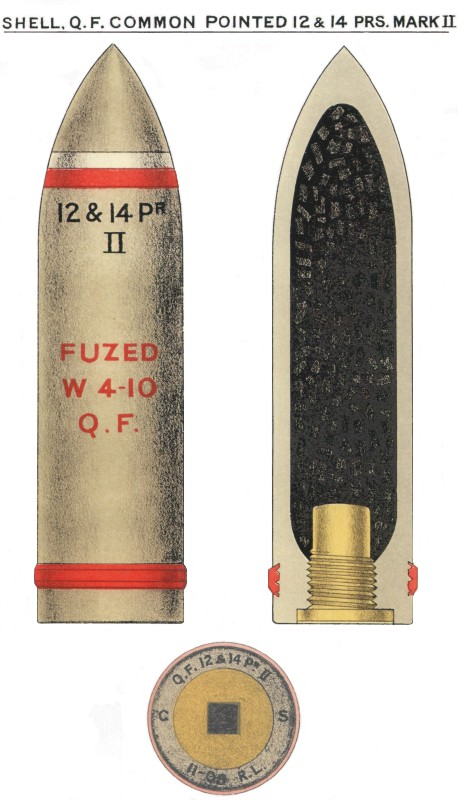
Mk II Common pointed shell

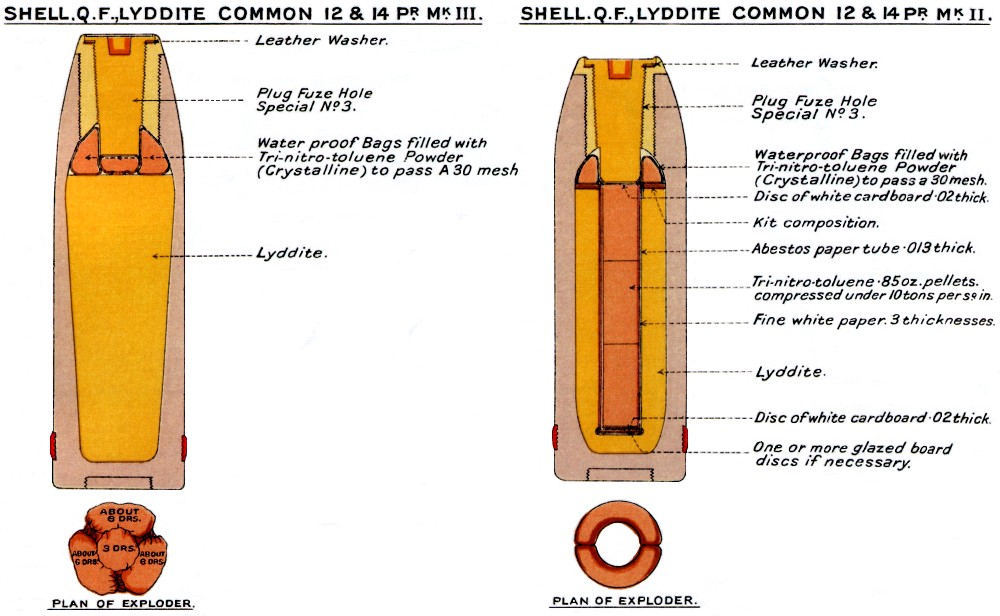
Mk II & Mk III Common Lyddite shell

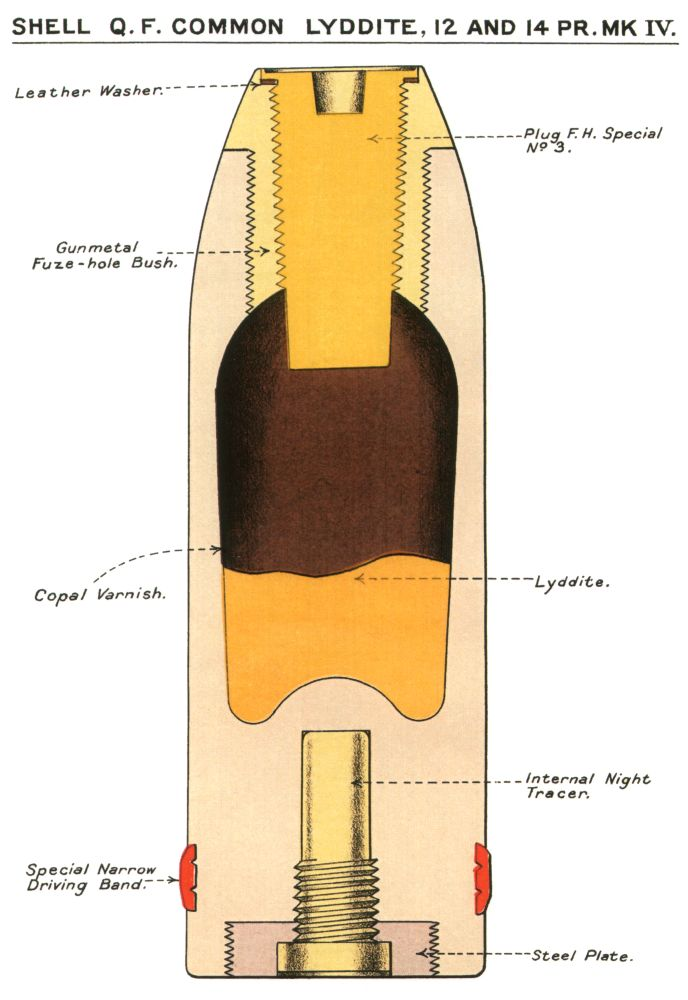
Mk IV Common Lyddite shell with internal night tracer, 1914

== See also ==
- List of naval guns
