= Italian submarine Uebi Scebeli =

Italian submarine

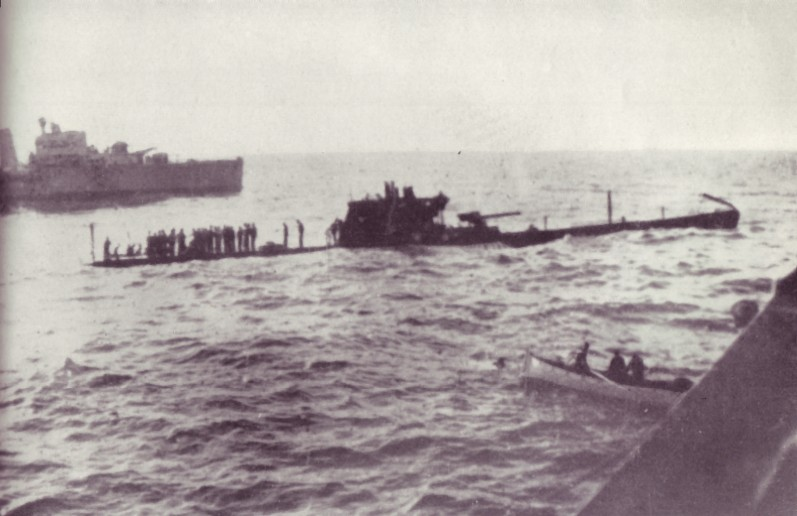
- Uebi Scebeli sinking after being attacked by British destroyers

History

Kingdom of Italy
- Name: Uebi Scebeli
- Namesake: Shebelle River
- Builder: Tosi, Taranto
- Laid down: 22 January 1937
- Launched: 3 October 1937
- Commissioned: 21 December 1937
- Fate: Scuttled, 29 June 1940

General characteristics
- Class & type: 600-Serie Adua-class submarine
- Displacement: 680 long tons (691 t) surfaced; 844 long tons (858 t) submerged
- Length: 60.18 m (197 ft 5 in)
- Beam: 6.45 m (21 ft 2 in)
- Draft: 4.7 m (15 ft 5 in)
- Installed power: 1,200 bhp (890 kW) (diesels); 800 hp (600 kW) (electric motors)
- Propulsion: Diesel-electric; 2 × Tosi diesel engines; 2 × Marelli electric motors
- Speed: 14 knots (26 km/h; 16 mph) surfaced; 7.5 knots (13.9 km/h; 8.6 mph) submerged
- Range: 3,180 nmi (5,890 km; 3,660 mi) at 10.5 knots (19.4 km/h; 12.1 mph) surfaced; 74 nmi (137 km; 85 mi) at 4 knots (7.4 km/h; 4.6 mph) submerged; 7.5 nmi (13.9 km; 8.6 mi) at 7.5 knots (13.9 km/h; 8.6 mph) submerged
- Test depth: 80 m (260 ft)
- Complement: 44 (4 officers + 40 non-officers and sailors)
- Armament: 6 × 533 mm (21 in) torpedo tubes (4 bow, 2 stern); 1 × 100 mm (4 in) / 47 caliber deck gun; 2 x 1 – 13.2 mm (0.52 in) anti-aircraft guns

Italian submarine Uebi Scebeli was an Adua-class submarine built for the Royal Italian Navy (Regia Marina) during the 1930s. It was named after Shebelle River in Ethiopia.

== Design and description ==
The Adua-class submarines were essentially repeats of the preceding Perla class. They displaced 680 long tons (690 t) surfaced and 844 long tons (858 t) submerged. The submarines were 60.18 meters (197 ft 5 in) long, had a beam of 6.45 meters (21 ft 2 in) and a draft of 4.7 meters (15 ft 5 in).

For surface running, the boats were powered by two 600-brake-horsepower (447 kW) diesel engines, each driving one propeller shaft. When submerged each propeller was driven by a 400-horsepower (298 kW) electric motor. They could reach 14 knots (26 km/h; 16 mph) on the surface and 7.5 knots (13.9 km/h; 8.6 mph) underwater. On the surface, the Adua class had a range of 3,180 nautical miles (5,890 km; 3,660 mi) at 10.5 knots (19.4 km/h; 12.1 mph), submerged, they had a range of 74 nmi (137 km; 85 mi) at 4 knots (7.4 km/h; 4.6 mph).

The boats were armed with six internal 53.3 cm (21.0 in) torpedo tubes, four in the bow and two in the stern. One reload torpedo was carried for each tube, for a total of twelve. They were also armed with one 100 mm (4 in) deck gun for combat on the surface. The light anti-aircraft armament consisted of one or two pairs of 13.2 mm (0.52 in) machine guns.

== Construction and career ==
Uebi Scebeli was built at the Tosi shipyard at Taranto. She was launched on 3 October 1937 and commissioned on 21 December the same year. After delivery, Uebi Scebeli was assigned to 43rd Squadron based at Taranto. In 1938 she was reassigned to Tobruk but returned to Taranto by the end of 1939 and was assigned to the 46th Squadron (IV Submarine Group).

On 10 June 1940, after the declaration of war, Uebi Scebeli was sent out to patrol off Cerigotto but returned to the base five days later on 15 June 1940 without encountering any traffic.

On her second mission Uebi Scebeli was sent out to a defensive patrol in the Gulf of Taranto.

Her third and last mission started on 27 June 1940, when she left Taranto under the command of Capt. Bruno Zani, heading to her assigned area of operation, approximately 35 miles northeast of Derna.

At 6:30 on 29 June 1940, while cruising surfaced on her way to the assigned area of operation, Uebi Scebeli had spotted three British destroyers HMS Dainty, HMS Defender and HMS Ilex, part of a screening "Force C" during the English operation "MA3" (protection for British convoy traffic from Malta and Greece to Egypt).

Uebi Scebeli had to make a quick dive to a periscope depth, and tried to launch an attack, but it was detected by the British destroyers, and was heavily bombarded with depth charges that caused serious damage. Two other destroyers HMS Decoy (H75), and HMAS Voyager (D31) from "Force C" joined in. Due to sustained heavy damage, the crew had to scuttle the submarine at approximately 7:00 in the position 35°29′N 20°06′E.

The crew managed to throw overboard most of the secret documents, but some of them were retrieved by the British, including a copy of the Sommergibili Italiani SM 19/S code book. All crew members were rescued and captured by the British.
