= Operation Excess =

1941 British WWII supply convoys to Malta

- Part of the Battle of the Mediterranean of the Second World War
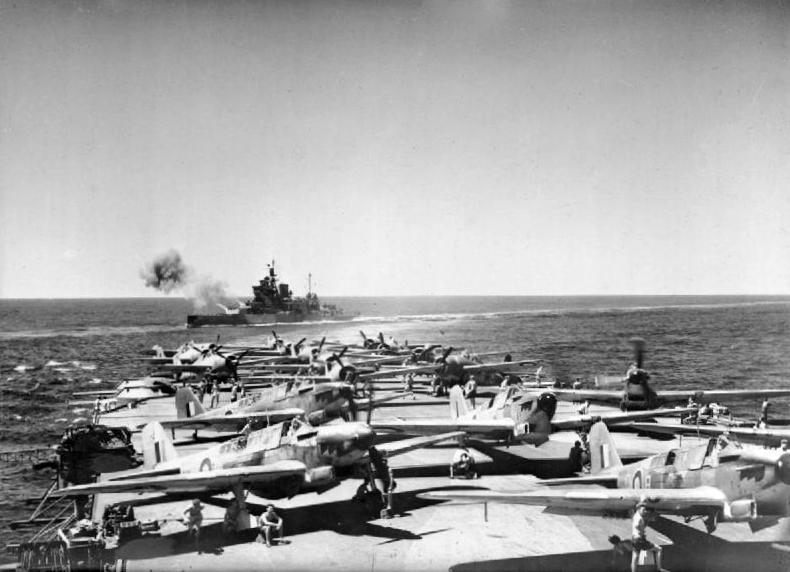
- A later image taken from Illustrious showing Valiant in the background. Both ships were part of Force A and the closest aircraft are Fulmar fighters of the type defending Operation Excess.
Date	10–11 January 1941
Location	Mediterranean Sea
Result	British victory

Belligerents
British Empire; United Kingdom; Australia	Italy; Germany

Strength
1 aircraft carrier; 2 battleships; 3 cruisers; 7 destroyers	2 destroyers; Stuka dive-bombers and fighters

Casualties and losses
1 aircraft carrier damaged; 1 cruiser sunk; 1 cruiser damaged; 1 destroyer write-off	1 torpedo boat sunk; 8 aircraft shot down; (British claim)

Operation Excess was a series of British supply convoys to Malta, Alexandria and Greece in January 1941. The operation was the first to encounter Luftwaffe anti-shipping aircraft over the Mediterranean Sea and all the convoyed freighters reached their destinations. The destroyer Gallant was disabled by Italian mines and Axis bombers severely damaged the cruiser Southampton and the aircraft carrier Illustrious.

== Background ==
Italy's declaration of War on 10 June 1940 brought the Second World War to the Mediterranean Sea and placed the Regia Aeronautica astride the traditional British sea route to Indian Ocean ports, while the Regia Marina roughly tripled the numbers of battleships, cruisers and submarines available to challenge British sea power. The Royal Navy had held the eastern Mediterranean and France the western Mediterranean but the Second Armistice at Compiègne removed the French navy from the alliance on 25 June 1940.

From bases at Gibraltar and Alexandria, the Royal Navy attempted to convoy supplies to Malta to maintain it as a base in the central Mediterranean. As Italy attacked Egypt from Libya in September 1940 and Greece from Albania in October 1940, the Royal Navy maintained most of the Mediterranean Fleet at Alexandria and used Force H at Gibraltar for raids. British successes in early November 1940, including providing help to the Greeks to defeat the Italian offensive in Greece and the Royal Navy disabling Italian battleships Littorio, Conte di Cavour and Duilio at the Battle of Taranto, provided incentive and opportunity to supply Malta and Greece.

== Prelude ==
=== Operation MC 4 ===
==== Convoy Excess ====
The convoy comprised four freighters at Gibraltar, Clan Cumming (7,500 GRT), Clan MacDonald (9,500 GRT) and Empire Song (9,000 GRT) carried materiel destined for Piraeus. Essex (13,500 GRT) carried 3,000 long tons (3,000 t) of seed potatoes, 4,000 long tons (4,100 t) of ammunition and twelve crated Hawker Hurricanes for Malta.

==== Convoy MW 5½ ====
Consisted of the slow freighters HMS Breconshire (9,776 GRT) and Clan Macaulay (10,500 GRT) at Alexandria with cargo bound for Malta.

==== Convoy ME 5½ ====
The fast merchant ships of Malta East, Lanarkshire (10,000 GRT) and Weiwara (12,500 GRT) were to reach Alexandria.

==== Convoy ME 6 ====
The slow freighters Volo (1,500 GRT), Pontfield (8,500 GRT), Rodi (3,500 GRT), Trocas (7,500 GRT), Hoegh Hood (tanker 9,500 GRT) from Malta were bound for Port Said and Devis (6,000 GRT) for Alexandria.

=== Mediterranean Fleet ===
==== Force A ====
Comprised the battleships HMS Warspite, Valiant and the aircraft carrier HMS Illustrious with the destroyers HMS Mohawk, Nubian, Dainty, Gallant, Greyhound, Griffin, Jervis to sail from Alexandria, covering convoys MC 4, MW 5 and ME 6, east of the Skerki Banks.

==== Force B ====
Comprised the cruisers HMS Gloucester, Southampton and the destroyer Ilex that would carry five hundred soldiers and airmen from the Aegean to Malta and join Convoy MC 4 after dropping their passengers in Malta.

==== Force C ====
Was to screen Convoy MW 5 with the anti-aircraft cruiser HMS Calcutta and the destroyers Defender and Diamond, with the corvettes HMS Peony, Salvia, Hyacinth and Gloxinia.

==== Force D ====
The cruisers HMS Ajax, HMS York Orion and Perth forming Force D, were to sail from Alexandria with the submarine HMS Pandora.

=== From Gibraltar ===
==== Force F ====
Force F was to cover Convoy MC 4 with the cruiser HMS Bonaventure and the destroyers Hasty, Hereward, Hero and HMS Jaguar carrying four hundred soldiers and airmen to Malta.

==== Force G ====
Consisted of the submarines HMS Triumph and Upholder.

==== Force H ====
Force H was to protect Convoy MC 4 from Gibraltar to the Skerki Banks with the battleship HMS Malaya, the battlecruiser HMS Renown, the aircraft carrier HMS Ark Royal ferrying six Swordfish to Malta, the cruiser Sheffield and the destroyers HMS Faulknor, Firedrake, Forester, Fortune and Fury.

=== Axis ===
Five hundred anti-shipping aircraft of Fliegerkorps X were being transferred from Norway to Sicily to protect Axis convoys to North Africa and prevent passage of British convoys to Malta.

== Operations ==
=== 6 January 1941 ===
Convoy MC 4 left Gibraltar, feinting toward the Atlantic, before turning toward Malta after dark, to mislead Axis agents near Gibraltar.

=== 7 January ===
Force H sailed from Gibraltar to cover convoy MC 4. Force A, Force D and convoy MW 5 with Force C sailed from Alexandria and Force B sailed from the Aegean toward Malta. Force A was located by Italian air reconnaissance that afternoon.

=== 8 January ===
Force B landed its passengers in Malta and proceeded west to meet Convoy MC 4. Wellington bombers raided Naples, damaging Giulio Cesare with three near misses and causing the only operational Italian battleship, Vittorio Veneto, to retreat from the approaching convoys.

=== 9 January ===
Force A was joined by Force D and HMAS Sydney 210 nmi (240 mi; 390 km) south-east of Malta, Force B joined convoy MC 4; Convoy MC 4 and Force H were discovered by Italian aircraft and attacked by ten SM.79s from Sardinia. Two SM.79s were shot down by Fulmars from Ark Royal and a later attack by 15 Fiat CR.42 Falcos carrying 220 lb (100 kg) bombs also failed. Force H left convoy MC 4 that afternoon after Ark Royal launched six Swordfish for the defence of Malta; Force A joined convoy MC 4 at dusk.

=== 10 January ===
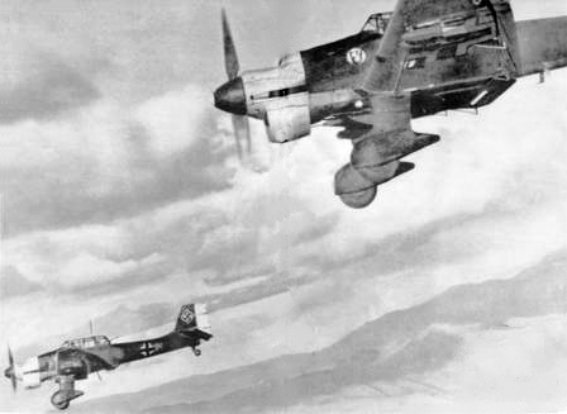
Few ships survived dive bombing attacks of the intensity Illustrious endured from these Ju 87 Stukas.

Italian ships from La Spezia failed to find Force H. The Italian submarine Ruggiero Settimo and torpedo boats Circe and Vega (Commander Giuseppe Fontana) launched torpedoes against Convoy MC 4 but missed. As Renouf, the close-escort commander aboard Gloucester, ordered the convoy to change course to avoid the threat, Bonaventure and Hereward engaged and sank Vega 6 nmi (11 km; 6.9 mi) south of Pantellaria at 08:30. Circe escaped undamaged, Bonaventure was slightly damaged and suffered two men killed; 75 per cent of her ammunition had been expended and two of Vega's crew survived. The encounter had pushed the British convoy south of its route and Gallant, rejoining the convoy with Force A, struck a naval mine at 08:35, losing her bow. Mohawk took Gallant in tow towards Malta and the cruisers of Force B provided anti-aircraft protection. Convoy MC 4 and Convoy MW 5 arrived at Malta and Convoy ME 6 departed for Alexandria.

Fulmars from Illustrious shot down an Italian aircraft shadowing Force A at 09:30. Valiant avoided torpedoes from two SM.79sil approaching under the radar horizon at 12:30. As the Fulmar combat air patrol descended to engage the SM.79s, Force A was attacked at 12:35 by 18 Heinkel He 111s of Kampfgeschwader 26 (KG 26) and 43 Junkers Ju 87s of Sturzkampfgeschwader 1 (StG 1) and Sturzkampfgeschwader 2 (StG 2) escorted by 10 Messerschmitt Bf 110 (Bf 110) of Zerstörergeschwader 26 (ZG 26).

Illustrious completed launching Fulmar and Swordfish patrol aircraft as the attack developed. Illustrious was the main target and was enveloped in waterspouts and mist of exploding bombs. Some bombers diving from 12,000 ft (3,700 m) delayed bomb release until they pulled-out lower than the height of Illustrious' funnel. The five Fulmars on patrol had not returned from chasing the SM.79s which attacked Valiant and the last four Fulmars to take off were unable to gain altitude rapidly enough to break up the attack. The Fulmars claimed eight enemy aircraft during the bombing of Force A as they shuttled to Malta airfields to refuel and re-arm.

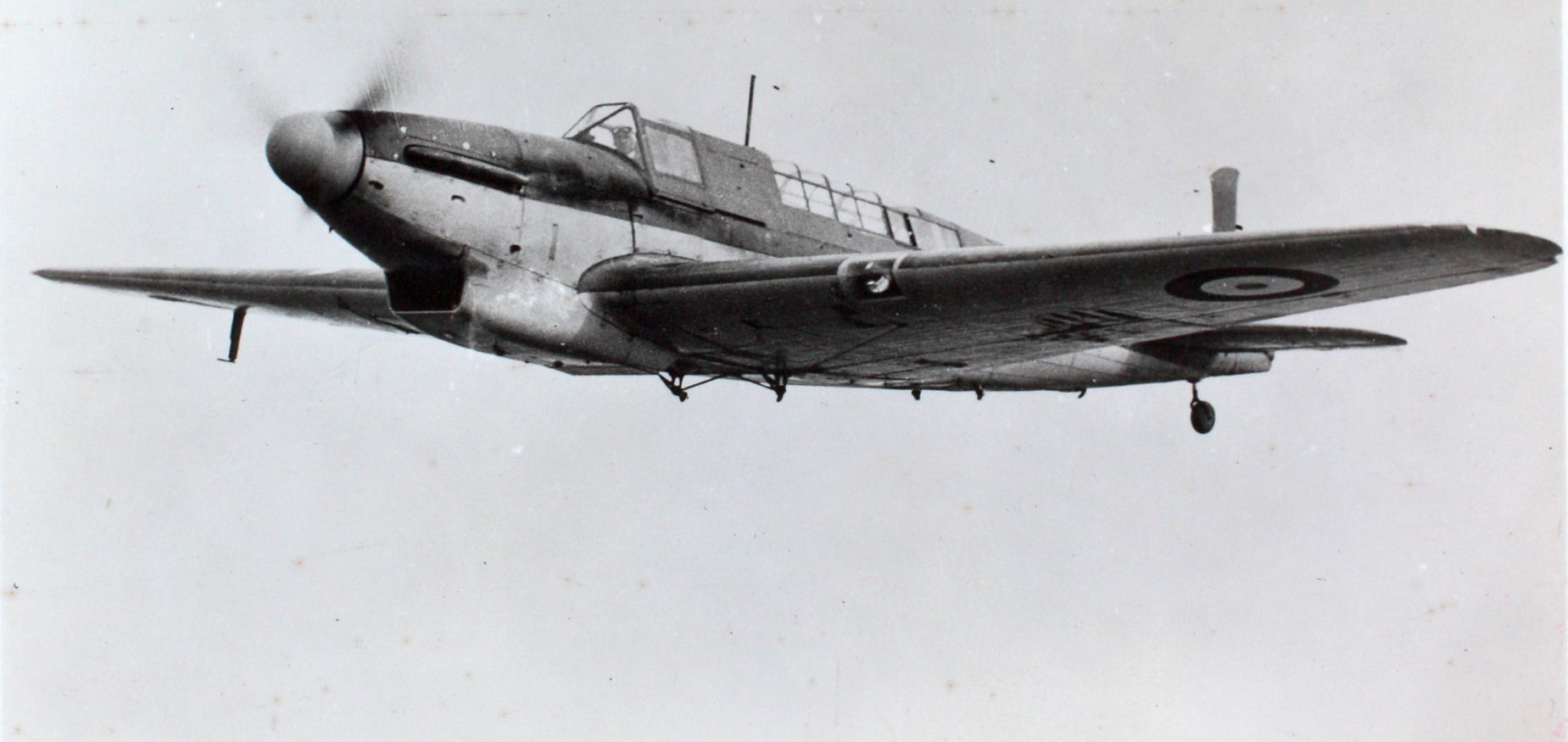
Fairey Fulmar Mk I

Warspite was lightly damaged by a bomb. Illustrious was hit by five bombs, including one which failed to explode and a near miss disabled her rudder mechanism. A bomb striking a lowered elevator caused extensive hangar damage, with many casualties among aircraft maintenance personnel and the destruction of nine Swordfish and five Fulmars. At 15:30 Illustrious headed for Malta steering with engines and the bombing continued. Seven SM.79 bombers were discouraged by massed anti-aircraft fire but an attack by six Italian Ju 87s at 16:00 scored another bomb hit and two near misses. Fourteen German Ju 87s missed Valiant and Janus and a later attack by fourteen He 111s was similarly ineffective. Illustrious reached Malta at 21:30 and suffered 126 dead and 91 wounded by the time she departed from Malta.

=== 11 January ===
Gallant was beached in Grand Harbour at dawn and never repaired. As Mohawk and the Force B cruisers steamed from Malta to rejoin Force A, they were surprised by 12 Ju 87R dive bombers of II/StG 2 attacking out of the sun at 15:20. Gloucester was hit by a bomb which failed to explode and Southampton was hit by two bombs, which killed eighty men and started fires, requiring the ship to be scuttled 180 nmi (210 mi; 330 km) east of Malta. Force H returned to Gibraltar.

=== 12 January ===
Force A was reinforced west of Crete by Force B, the cruisers of Force D, the battleship HMS Barham and the aircraft carrier HMS Eagle from Alexandria.

=== 13 January ===
Convoy ME 6 arrived at Alexandria.

== Illustrious Blitz ==
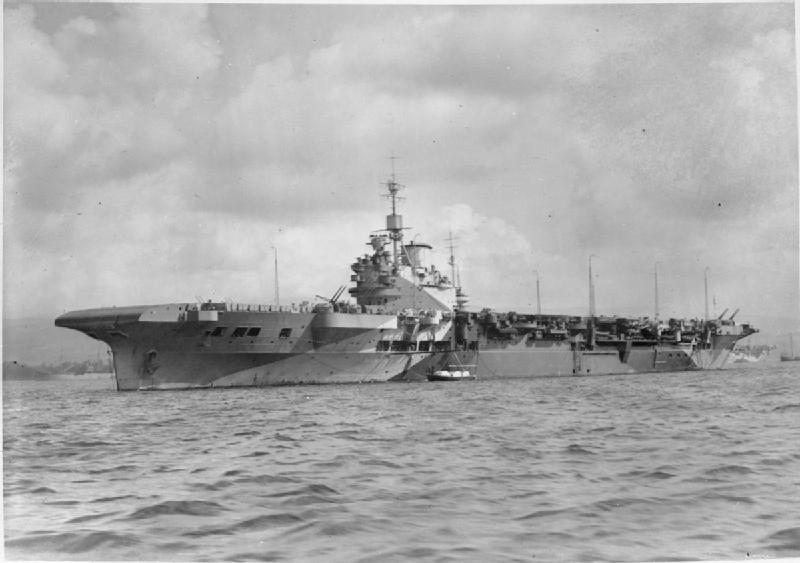
Photograph of HMS Illustrious at anchor during the war

What the Maltese called the Illustrious Blitz began when bomb stocks depleted during the attacks of 10 and 11 January were replenished and the Axis made a maximum effort to destroy Illustrious before she could be repaired. Illustrious and Essex were hit during an air raid on 16 January. Ten Macchi C.202s, ten CR.42s and twenty Bf 110s escorted 44 Ju 87s. Bombs exploding in Grand Harbour killed numerous fish, that were collected after the raid and eaten. Illustrious was not seriously damaged but a bomb exploded in Essex's engine room killing 15 men and wounding 23 more.

There was another heavy air raid on 17 January and Illustrious was again hit in an air raid on 18 January. Illustrious was not damaged by the last big attack on 19 January. Illustrious departed Malta on 23 January but her Fulmars remained for the defence of the island. Illustrious was able to complete additional repairs after reaching Alexandria on 25 January but restoration of full combat effectiveness required a trip to United States shipyards.

== Casualties ==
Fairey Fulmar fighters and AA gunners of the Royal Navy shot down at least seven aircraft on 10 January 1941, in defence of Illustrious, while one Fulmar was lost. In 1994, James Sadkovich wrote that five German and two Italian aircraft shot down, while teo FAA aircraft were lost. Pitcairn-Jones (2014) has the Fulmars shooting down fiv aircraft and the AA three, for one Fulmar lost. No merchantmen were lost during Excess but the aircraft carrier Illustrious was severely damaged, the cruiser Southampton was sunk and the cruiser Gloucester was damaged by bombing; the destroyer Gallant was damaged by a mine.

== British order of battle ==
=== Convoys ===
Merchant ships
Ship	Year	Flag	GRT	Notes
Convoy Excess
Clan Cumming	1938	Merchant Navy	7,264	Gibraltar to Piraeus
Clan Macdonald	1939	Merchant Navy	9,653	Gibraltar to Piraeus
Empire Song	1940	Merchant Navy	9,228	Gibraltar to Piraeus
Essex	1936	Merchant Navy	11,063	Gibraltar to Malta
Convoy MW 5½ (slow)
HMS Breconshire	1939	Merchant Navy	9,776	Alexandria to Malta
Clan Macaulay	1936	Merchant Navy	10,492	Alexandria to Malta
Convoy ME 5½ (fast)
Lanarkshire	1940	Merchant Navy	8,181	Malta to Alexandria
Waiwera	1934	Merchant Navy	10,800	Malta to Alexandria
Convoy ME 6 (slow)
SS Volo	1938	Merchant Navy	1,587	Malta to Port Said
Pontfield	1939	Merchant Navy	8,319	Malta to Port Said
Rodi		Merchant Navy	3,500	Malta to Port Said
Trocas	1927	Merchant Navy	7,406	Malta to Port Said
Hoegh Hood	1939	Norway	9,351	Tanker, Malta to Port Said
Devis	1938	Merchant Navy	6,054	Malta to Alexandria

=== Mediterranean Fleet ===
Eastern Escort forces
Ship	Flag	Type	Notes
Force A
HMS Warspite	Royal Navy	Queen Elizabeth-class battleship	
HMS Valiant	Royal Navy	Queen Elizabeth-class battleship	
HMS Illustrious	Royal Navy	Illustrious-class aircraft carrier	
HMS Mohawk	Royal Navy	Tribal-class destroyer	
HMS Nubian	Royal Navy	Tribal-class destroyer	
HMS Dainty	Royal Navy	D-class destroyer	
HMS Gallant	Royal Navy	G-class destroyer	
HMS Greyhound	Royal Navy	G-class destroyer	
HMS Griffin	Royal Navy	G-class destroyer	
HMS Jervis	Royal Navy	J-class destroyer	
Force B
HMS Gloucester	Royal Navy	Town-class cruiser	
HMS Southampton	Royal Navy	Town-class cruiser	
HMS Ilex	Royal Navy	I-class destroyer	
Force C
HMS Calcutta	Royal Navy	Light cruiser	
HMS Defender	Royal Navy	-class destroyer	
HMS Diamond	Royal Navy	-class destroyer	
HMS Peony	Royal Navy	Flower-class corvette	
HMS Salvia	Royal Navy	Flower-class corvette	
HMS Hyacinth	Royal Navy	Flower-class corvette	
HMS Gloxinia	Royal Navy	Flower-class corvette	
Force D
HMS Ajax	Royal Navy	Leander-class cruiser	
HMS Orion	Royal Navy	Leander-class cruiser	
HMS York	Royal Navy	York-class cruiser	
HMS Perth	Royal Navy	Ocean Boarding Vessel	

=== Gibraltar forces ===
Western escort forces
Ship	Flag	Type	Notes
Force F
HMS Bonaventure	Royal Navy	Dido-class cruiser	
HMS Hasty	Royal Navy	H-class destroyer	
HMS Hereward	Royal Navy	H-class destroyer	
HMS Hero	Royal Navy	H-class destroyer	
HMS Jaguar	Royal Navy	J-class destroyer	
Force G
HMS Triumph	Royal Navy	British T-class submarine	
HMS Upholder	Royal Navy	British U-class submarine	
Force H
HMS Malaya	Royal Navy	Queen Elizabeth-class battleship	
HMS Renown	Royal Navy	Renown-class battlecruiser	
HMS Ark Royal	Royal Navy	Aircraft carrier	
HMS Sheffield	Royal Navy	Town-class cruiser	
HMS Faulknor	Royal Navy	F-class destroyer	
HMS Firedrake	Royal Navy	F-class destroyer	
HMS Forester	Royal Navy	F-class destroyer	
HMS Fortune	Royal Navy	F-class destroyer	
HMS Fury	Royal Navy	F-class destroyer	

== See also ==
- Battle of the Mediterranean
- Malta Convoys
