= Giuseppe Fontana =

Italian naval officer (1902–1941)

- Born: 22 August 1902; Vicenza, Kingdom of Italy
- Died: 10 January 1941 (aged 38); Mediterranean Sea, off Pantelleria
- Military career
- Allegiance: Kingdom of Italy
- Branch: Regia Marina
- Service years: 1918–1941
- Rank: Capitano di Fregata (Commander)
- Commands: Albatros (torpedo boat); Vega (torpedo boat); 10th Torpedo Boat Squadron
- Conflicts: Spanish Civil War World War II: Operation Excess †
- Awards: Gold Medal of Military Valor (posthumous)

Giuseppe Fontana (22 August 1902 – 10 January 1941) was an Italian naval officer during World War II.

== Biography ==
He was born in Vicenza on 22 August 1902, and after enlisting in the Royal Italian Navy at the age of sixteen, he began to attend the Royal Naval Academy of Livorno, graduating with the rank of ensign in July 1923. He was promoted to sub-lieutenant in 1925 and lieutenant in 1928. After serving on various warships, he obtained his first command with the torpedo boat Albatros and later became executive officer of the armored cruiser San Giorgio.

After promotion to lieutenant commander on January 25, 1937, he became executive officer of the destroyer Antonio Da Noli, on which he took part in naval blockade operations against the Second Spanish Republic during the Spanish Civil War. On March 28, 1939 he was given command of the 10th Torpedo Boat Squadron, raising his flag on the Vega, of which he was also the commanding officer. Shortly before the Kingdom of Italy entered the Second World War on 10 June 1940, he was promoted to the rank of Commander.

At dawn on 10 January 1941 Vega and sistership Circe were sent to intercept a British convoy bound for Malta (Operation Excess) off Pantelleria. Between 7:26 and 7:28 the two torpedo boats unsuccessfully launched their torpedoes and then engaged the convoy escort, consisting of three light cruisers and five destroyers, with their guns. One of Vega's shells hit HMS Bonaventure, causing some light damage and two casualties, but the cruiser's return fire disabled Vega's engines, destroyed her stern guns and blew up her stern ammunition magazine, leaving her a blazing wreck. Vega kept returning fire with the only functional gun until she was finished off by a torpedo fire by HMS Hereward at 8:15. Commander Fontana went down with his ship after giving his lifejacket to his chief engineer, Leopoldo Di Luca. He was posthumously awarded the Gold Medal of Military Valor.
