= HMS Dainty (H53) =

British D-class destroyer

Coordinates: 32°4′24″N 24°4′42″E

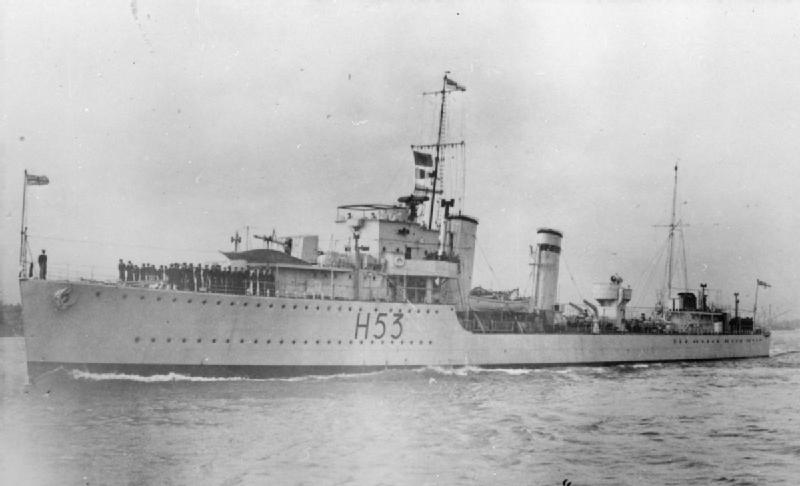

History

United Kingdom
- Name: HMS Dainty
- Ordered: 2 February 1931
- Builder: Fairfield Shipbuilding and Engineering Company, Govan, Scotstoun
- Cost: £229,378
- Laid down: 20 April 1931
- Launched: 3 May 1932
- Completed: 22 December 1932
- Identification: Pennant number H53
- Motto: Dulce quod utile: 'It is pleasant if it is useful'.
- Fate: Sunk by air attack, 24 February 1941
- Badge: On a Field Blue, a Fan White and Gold.

General characteristics
- Class & type: D-class destroyer
- Displacement: 1,375 long tons (1,397 t) (standard); 1,890 long tons (1,920 t) (deep)
- Length: 329 ft (100.3 m) o/a
- Beam: 33 ft (10.1 m)
- Draught: 12 ft 6 in (3.8 m)
- Installed power: 36,000 shp (27,000 kW)
- Propulsion: 2 × shafts, 2 × Parsons geared steam turbines; 3 × Admiralty 3-drum boilers
- Speed: 36 knots (67 km/h; 41 mph)
- Range: 5,870 nmi (10,870 km; 6,760 mi) at 15 knots (28 km/h; 17 mph)
- Complement: 145
- Sensors & processing systems: ASDIC
- Armament: 4 × QF 4.7-inch Mark IX guns; 1 × 12-pounder (3 in (76.2 mm)) anti-aircraft (AA) gun; 2 × 4 – QF .5-inch Vickers Mark III AA machine guns; 2 × 4 – 21 inch (533 mm) torpedo tubes; 20 × depth charges, 1 rail and 2 throwers

HMS Dainty was a D-class destroyer built for the Royal Navy in the early 1930s. The ship was initially assigned to the Mediterranean Fleet before she was transferred to the China Station in early 1935. She was temporarily deployed in the Red Sea during late 1935 during the Abyssinia Crisis, before returning to her assigned station where she remained until mid-1939. Dainty was transferred back to the Mediterranean Fleet just before World War II began in September 1939. She briefly was assigned to West Africa for convoy escort duties in 1940 before returning to the Mediterranean. The ship participated in the Battle of Calabria in July 1940 and was assigned to convoy escort and patrol duties until she was sunk by German bombers off Tobruk on 24 February 1941.

== Description ==
Dainty displaced 1,375 long tons (1,397 t) at standard load and 1,890 long tons (1,920 t) at deep load. The ship had an overall length of 329 feet (100.3 m), a beam of 33 feet (10.1 m) and a draught of 12 feet 6 inches (3.8 m). She was powered by Parsons geared steam turbines, driving two shafts, which developed a total of 36,000 shaft horsepower (27,000 kW) and gave a maximum speed of 36 knots (67 km/h; 41 mph). Steam for the turbines was provided by three Admiralty 3-drum water-tube boilers. Dainty carried a maximum of 473 long tons (481 t) of fuel oil that gave her a range of 5,870 nautical miles (10,870 km; 6,760 mi) at 15 knots (28 km/h; 17 mph). The ship's complement was 145 officers and men.

The ship mounted four 45-calibre QF 4.7-inch Mark IX guns in single mounts. For anti-aircraft (AA) defence, Dainty had a single 12-pounder (3-inch (76.2 mm)) gun and two quadruple Mark I mounts for the QF 0.5-inch Vickers Mark III machine gun. She was fitted with two above-water quadruple torpedo tube mounts for 21-inch torpedoes. One depth charge rail and two throwers were fitted; 20 depth charges were originally carried, but this increased to 35 shortly after the war began.

== Construction and career ==
Dainty was ordered on 2 February 1931 under the 1930 Naval Estimates and was laid down at the yards of the Fairfield Shipbuilding and Engineering Company, Govan, Scotstoun on 20 April 1931. She was launched on 3 May 1932 and completed on 22 December 1932, at a total cost of £229,378, excluding equipment supplied by the Admiralty, such as weapons, ammunition and wireless equipment.

The ship was initially assigned to the 1st Destroyer Flotilla in the Mediterranean and made a brief deployment to the Persian Gulf and Red Sea in October–November 1933. Dainty was refitted at Portsmouth between 3 September and 23 October 1934 for service on the China Station with the 8th (later the 21st) Destroyer Flotilla and arrived there on 3 January 1935. She was attached to the Mediterranean Fleet in the Red Sea from 30 September 1935 to June 1936 during the Abyssinian Crisis. The ship was refitted afterwards in Hong Kong between 21 September and 15 October and conducted anti-piracy patrols after her refit was complete. On 21 January 1937, the merchant ship SS Hsin Pekin grounded on the Nemesis Rock off Ningbo and Dainty posted a guard aboard her until she was refloated. The ship made a number of port visits in Sarawak, Singapore and the Philippines in January–March 1938. As war loomed, she was transferred to the Mediterranean Fleet, arriving at Alexandria with her sister Duncan on 30 September 1939, after the outbreak of World War II.

Dainty was assigned to search for contraband being shipped across the Mediterranean throughout October and November, before undergoing a refit at Malta from 8–30 December. On its completion she was transferred to the 2nd Destroyer Division, based in Freetown, Sierra Leone to search for German commerce raiders operating in the South Atlantic. The ship was transferred back to the Mediterranean Fleet in April and was given another refit at Malta from 21 April to 2 June 1940. On its completion, Dainty was assigned to the 10th Destroyer Flotilla.

On 12 June, she rescued over 400 survivors from the light cruiser Calypso, which had been sunk off Crete. Eight days later, the ship, and three other destroyers, escorted the French battleship Lorraine and three British cruisers as they bombarded Bardia during the night of 20/21 June. On 27 June, Dainty, her sisters Defender and Decoy, with destroyers Ilex and HMAS Voyager, attacked the Italian submarine Console Generale Liuzzi and damaged her badly, forcing her crew to abandon and scuttle Liuzzi. Two days later, Dainty and Ilex attacked the submarines Uebi Scebeli and Salpa, sinking Uebi Scebeli, although Salpa was able to escape. The British ships were able to salvage important encryption material, including the latest codebook. They may also have been responsible for the sinking of the Italian submarine Argonauta on 29 June as she returned from Tobruk.

Dainty participated in the Battle of Calabria on 9 July as an escort for the heavy ships of Force C and unsuccessfully engaged Italian destroyers and suffered no damage. Together with her sisters Defender and Diamond, the Australian destroyer Stuart, and the light cruisers Capetown and Liverpool, she escorted Convoy AN.2 from Egypt to various ports in the Aegean Sea in late July. On 29 August Dainty, Diamond and the destroyers Jervis, Juno escorted the Royal Fleet Auxiliary tanker Plumleaf and two merchant ships, SS Cornwall and SS Volo, from Egypt to Malta with relief supplies. Dainty and Ilex escorted the Australian light cruiser Sydney as she bombarded the Italian airfield on Scarpanto on 4 September.

Together with three Australian destroyers and two British anti-aircraft cruisers, the ship escorted a convoy from Egypt to Suda Bay, Crete and then to Malta in early November. In December she was assigned to intercept enemy supply convoys along the North African coast and captured two schooners off Bardia on 31 December. In early January 1941, Dainty escorted the capital ships of Force A during Operation Excess. She towed the disabled tanker Desmoulea to Suda Bay after the latter had been torpedoed by the Italian torpedo boat Lupo off Crete on 31 January.

=== Sinking ===
Shortly afterwards, Dainty returned to patrol the North African coast. In the late afternoon of 24 February she left Tobruk on a patrol, accompanied by the destroyer Hasty. The ships were attacked by 13 Junkers Ju 88 bombers of III./Lehrgeschwader 1 and Dainty was hit by a 1,000 lb (450 kg) bomb which passed through the captain's cabin and detonated in the fuel tanks. This started a large fire, which caused her after magazine to explode and the ship to sink. 16 of Dainty's crew were killed in the attack and 18 were wounded.
