= HMS Ilex =

Destroyer of the Royal Navy

- Ilex in port

History

United Kingdom
- Name: Ilex
- Namesake: Ilex
- Builder: John Brown and Company, Clydebank, Scotland
- Cost: £255,072
- Laid down: 10 March 1936
- Launched: 28 January 1937
- Commissioned: 7 July 1937
- Identification: Pennant number: D61
- Fate: Sold 1946, scrapped 1948

General characteristics (as built)
- Class & type: I-class destroyer
- Displacement: 1,370 long tons (1,390 t) (standard); 1,888 long tons (1,918 t) (deep load)
- Length: 323 ft (98.5 m)
- Beam: 33 ft (10.1 m)
- Draught: 12 ft 6 in (3.8 m)
- Installed power: 3 Admiralty 3-drum boilers; 34,000 shp (25,000 kW)
- Propulsion: 2 shafts, 2 geared steam turbines
- Speed: 35.5 knots (65.7 km/h; 40.9 mph)
- Range: 5,500 nmi (10,200 km; 6,300 mi) at 15 knots (28 km/h; 17 mph)
- Complement: 145
- Sensors & processing systems: ASDIC
- Armament: 4 × single 4.7 in (120 mm) guns; 2 × quadruple 0.5-inch (12.7 mm) machine guns; 2 × quintuple 21 in (533 mm) torpedo tubes; 1 × rack and 2 throwers for 16 depth charges

Service record
- Operations: Battle of Calabria (1940); Battle of Cape Spada (1940); Battle of Taranto (1940); Battle of Cape Matapan (1941); Allied invasion of Sicily (1943); Salerno landings (1943)
- Victories: Sank U-42 (1939); Sank Italian submarine Console Generale Liuzzi (1940); Sank Italian submarine Argonauta (1940); Sank Italian submarine Uebi Scebeli (1940)

HMS Ilex was one of nine I-class destroyers built for the Royal Navy during the 1930s. She is the only ship of the Royal Navy ever to have been named after Ilex, the genus of flowering plants commonly known as holly.

== Description ==
The I-class ships were improved versions of the preceding H-class. They displaced 1,370 long tons (1,390 t) at standard load and 1,888 long tons (1,918 t) at deep load. The ships had an overall length of 323 feet (98.5 m), a beam of 33 feet (10.1 m) and a draught of 12 feet 6 inches (3.8 m). They were powered by two Parsons geared steam turbines, each driving one propeller shaft, using steam provided by three Admiralty three-drum boilers. The turbines developed a total of 34,000 shaft horsepower (25,000 kW) and were intended to give a maximum speed of 35.5 knots (65.7 km/h; 40.9 mph). Ilex only reached a speed of 33.6 knots (62.2 km/h; 38.7 mph) from 34,487 shp (25,717 kW) during her sea trials. The ships carried enough fuel oil to give them a range of 5,500 nautical miles (10,200 km; 6,300 mi) at 15 knots (28 km/h; 17 mph). Their crew numbered 145 officers and ratings.

The ships mounted four 4.7-inch (120 mm) Mark IX guns in single mounts, designated 'A', 'B', 'X' and 'Y' from bow to stern. For anti-aircraft (AA) defence, they had two quadruple mounts for the 0.5 inch Vickers Mark III machine gun. The I class was fitted with two above-water quintuple torpedo tube mounts amidships for 21-inch (533 mm) torpedoes. One depth charge rack and two throwers were fitted; 16 depth charges were originally carried, but this increased to 35 shortly after the war began. The I-class ships were fitted with the ASDIC sound detection system to locate submarines underwater.

== Construction and career ==
=== 1939 ===
On the outbreak of war Ilex was deployed in the Mediterranean with the Third Destroyer Flotilla. She was immediately transferred to the Western Approaches for convoy escort duty with her flotilla. On 13 October under the command of Lieutenant Commander Philip Lionel Saumarez she attacked and sank U-42 south-west of Ireland in company with the destroyer Imogen.

=== 1940 ===
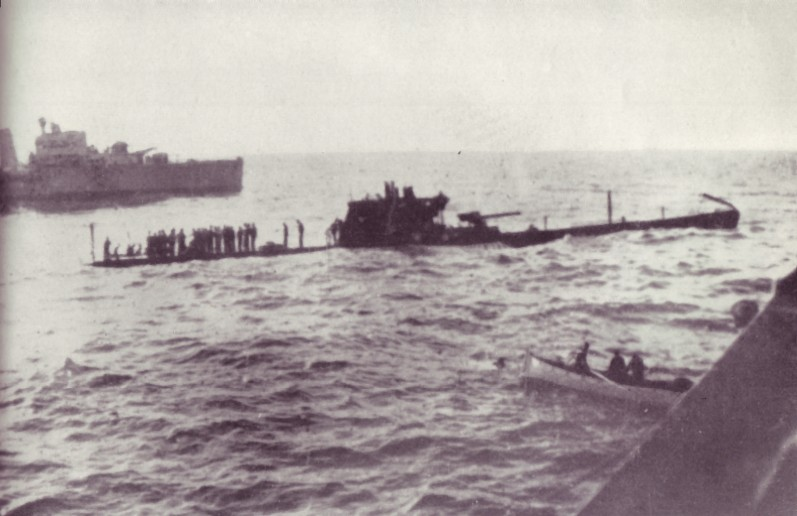
The Italian submarine Uebi Scebeli sinking after attacks by Ilex and Dainty

The first half of 1940 saw Ilex conducting Fleet screening duties in and around the North Sea. In May she transferred to the Second Destroyer Flotilla for service in the Mediterranean. On 27 June 1940, in company with Dainty, Defender, Decoy and the Australian destroyer Voyager she depth-charged the Italian submarine Console Generale Liuzzi off Crete. The submarine was forced to the surface and scuttled by her crew. Two days later, on 29 June, the ships attacked and probably sank the Italian submarine Argonauta at around 0615, although submarine might have been sunk by an RAF Sunderland later that day. Also on 29 June Dainty and Ilex shared in the sinking of the Italian submarine Uebi Scebeli south-west of Crete. Ilex participated in the Battle of Calabria and on 19 June escorted Sydney during the sinking of the Italian cruiser Bartolomeo Colleoni off Cape Spada, rescuing 230 survivors. Service with the Mediterranean Fleet continued through 1940 and on 11 November she was deployed as a screening destroyer for Illustrious during the Battle of Taranto the air attack on the Italian Fleet.

=== 1941 ===
On 20 March she formed part of the destroyer screen for the fleet at the Battle of Cape Matapan. On 14 June she suffered major structural damage from dive-bombing near misses during an operation to prevent interference by Vichy French warships. She was towed to Haifa and underwent a series of temporary repairs there, and at Suez, Aden, Mombassa and Durban, in order to reach the United States of America for a refit and full repair.

=== 1942 ===
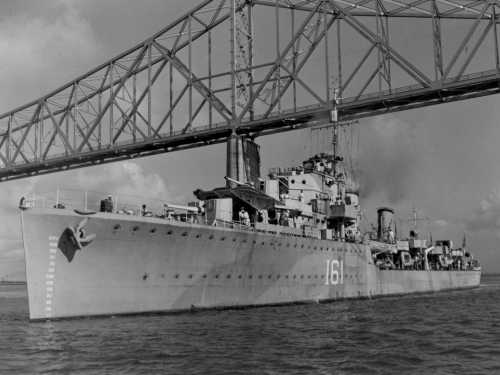
Ilex at Charleston on 7 September 1942

It was not until September 1942 that Ilex was re-commissioned. She spent the rest of the year at Freetown, Sierra Leone, conducting convoy duties.

=== 1943 ===
In February 1943 Ilex returned to the Mediterranean, and in July and August she participated in the Sicily and Salerno landings. On 13 July, she sank, with assistance from Echo, the Italian submarine Nereide south east of the Straits of Messina. In December she was withdrawn from operational service because of a high defect load and poor availability.

=== 1944 ===
Ilex was laid up at Bizerte in Tunisia, then transferred to Ferryville in June, and laid up there.

=== 1945 ===
In March 1945 the destroyer was towed to Malta for repair, and in April reduced to "reserve category C", the survey declaring her "not required for further operational service". She was placed on the disposal list in August.

== Disposal ==
Ilex was sold for scrap at Malta on 22 January 1946 and broken up in Sicily in 1948.

== Sea Cadet Corps ==
Salford Sea Cadets are affiliated with the ship and are named TS Ilex. Salford sea cadets are located in Worsley and provide youth services to young people aged 10–18 across the City of Salford.

The unit was incorporated in 1936 during Eccles warship week and is one of the oldest continuously operating youth groups in the city. The current City of Salford Sea Cadets is an amalgamation of Eccles and District Sea Cadets (TS Ilex) and Salford Sea Cadets (TS Irwell). The unit moved to its present home in Worsley in the late 1980s.

City of Salford Sea Cadets while an independent charity in its own right is also part of the larger Sea Cadet Corps

== Bibliography ==
- Caruana, Joseph (2012). "Question 21/48: Fate of I Class Destroyer Ilex". Warship International. XLIX (3): 211. ISSN 0043-0374.
- Colledge, J. J.; Warlow, Ben (2006) [1969]. Ships of the Royal Navy: The Complete Record of All Fighting Ships of the Royal Navy from the 15th Century to the Present (3rd Rev ed.). London: Chatham Publishing. ISBN 978-1-86176-281-8. OCLC 67375475.
- English, John (1993). Amazon to Ivanhoe: British Standard Destroyers of the 1930s. Kendal, England: World Ship Society. ISBN 0-905617-64-9.
- Friedman, Norman (2006). British Destroyers & Frigates: The Second World War and After. Annapolis, Maryland: Naval Institute Press. ISBN 1-86176-137-6.
- Lenton, H. T. (1998). British & Empire Warships of the Second World War. Annapolis, Maryland: Naval Institute Press. ISBN 1-55750-048-7.
- March, Edgar J. (1966). British Destroyers: A History of Development, 1892-1953; Drawn by Admiralty Permission From Official Records & Returns, Ships' Covers & Building Plans. London: Seeley Service. OCLC 164893555.
- Rohwer, Jürgen (2005). Chronology of the War at Sea 1939–1945: The Naval History of World War Two (Third Revised ed.). Annapolis, Maryland: Naval Institute Press. ISBN 1-59114-119-2.
- Whitley, M. J. (1988). Destroyers of World War Two: An International Encyclopedia. Annapolis, Maryland: Naval Institute Press. ISBN 0-87021-326-1.
