= HMS Decoy (H75) =

Royal Navy destroyer

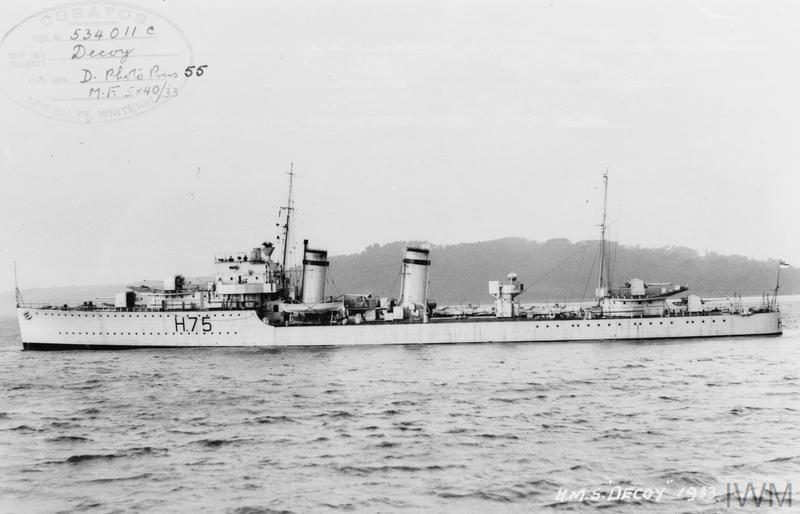
- Decoy in 1933

History

United Kingdom
- Name: Decoy
- Ordered: 2 February 1931
- Builder: John I. Thornycroft & Company, Southampton
- Laid down: 25 June 1931
- Launched: 7 June 1932
- Commissioned: 4 April 1933
- Motto: Cave quod celo; (Beware what I hide)
- Honours and awards: Mediterranean 1940; Calabria 1940; Greece 1941; Crete 1941; Libya 1941–42; Malta Convoys 1941–42; Atlantic 1942
- Fate: Transferred to RCN, 1 March 1943
- Badge: On a Field Green, a Hawk's lure gold

Canada
- Name: Kootenay
- Acquired: 1 March 1943
- Commissioned: 12 April 1943
- Decommissioned: 26 October 1945
- Honours and awards: Atlantic 1943–45; English Channel 1944; Biscay 1944; Normandy 1944
- Fate: Scrapped 1946

General characteristics
- Class & type: D-class destroyer
- Displacement: 1,375 long tons (1,397 t) (standard); 1,890 long tons (1,920 t) (deep)
- Length: 329 ft (100.3 m) o/a
- Beam: 33 ft (10.1 m)
- Draught: 12 ft 6 in (3.8 m)
- Installed power: 36,000 shp (27,000 kW)
- Propulsion: 2 × shafts; 2 × Parsons geared steam turbines; 3 × Admiralty 3-drum boilers
- Speed: 36 knots (67 km/h; 41 mph)
- Range: 5,870 nmi (10,870 km; 6,760 mi) at 15 knots (28 km/h; 17 mph)
- Complement: 145
- Sensors & processing systems: ASDIC
- Armament: 4 × 1 - 4.7-inch Mk IX guns; 1 × 1 - QF 3-inch 20 cwt anti-aircraft gun; 2 × 4 - QF .5 in (12.7 mm) Vickers Mk III AA machine guns; 2 × 4 - 21 inch (533 mm) torpedo tubes; 20 × depth charges, 1 rail and 2 throwers

HMS Decoy was a D-class destroyer of the Royal Navy. Ordered in 1931, the ship was constructed by John I. Thornycroft & Company, and entered naval service in 1933. Decoy was initially assigned to the Mediterranean Fleet before she was transferred to the China Station in early 1935. She was temporarily deployed in the Red Sea during late 1935 during the Abyssinia Crisis, before returning to her duty station where she remained until mid-1939. Decoy was transferred back to the Mediterranean Fleet just before the Second World War began in September 1939. She briefly was assigned to West Africa for convoy escort duties in 1940 before returning to the Mediterranean. The ship participated in the Battles of Calabria without significant damage and escorted ships of the Mediterranean Fleet for most of the rest of the year.

Decoy assisted in the evacuations from Greece and Crete in April–May 1941. She began escorting supply convoys in June to Tobruk, Libya, until the ship was badly damaged in a collision in November. Repairs were not completed until February 1942 and Decoy was transferred to the Eastern Fleet in the Indian Ocean the following month. She remained there until September when she was ordered to return to Britain. The ship was refitted as an escort destroyer from November to April 1943 and transferred to the Royal Canadian Navy that same month as HMCS Kootenay. The ship was assigned to convoy escort duties in the mid-Atlantic for the rest of 1943 and early 1944. Kootenay was transferred back to British coastal waters in May to protect the build up for Operation Overlord. Together with other ships, she sank three German submarines between July and September. The ship was given a lengthy refit in Canada from October to February 1945 and returned to the English Channel in April to protect against any last-gasp efforts by the Kriegsmarine to interfere with Allied supply lines to the Continent. After the end of the war in May, Kootenay served as a troop transport in Canadian waters. She was placed in reserve in October and broken up in 1946.

== Description ==
Decoy displaced 1,375 long tons (1,397 t) at standard load and 1,890 long tons (1,920 t) at deep load. The ship had an overall length of 329 feet (100.3 m), a beam of 33 feet (10.1 m) and a draught of 12 feet 6 inches (3.8 m). She was powered by Parsons geared steam turbines, driving two shafts, which developed a total of 36,000 shaft horsepower (27,000 kW) and gave a maximum speed of 36 knots (67 km/h; 41 mph). Steam for the turbines was provided by three Admiralty 3-drum water-tube boilers. Decoy carried a maximum of 473 long tons (481 t) of fuel oil that gave her a range of 5,870 nautical miles (10,870 km; 6,760 mi) at 15 knots (28 km/h; 17 mph). The ship's complement was 145 officers and men.

The ship mounted four 45-calibre QF 4.7-inch Mk IX guns in single mounts, designated 'A', 'B', 'X', and 'Y' from front to rear. For anti-aircraft (AA) defence, Decoy had a single QF 3-inch 20 cwt (Note: "cwt" is the abbreviation for hundredweight, 30 cwt referring to the weight of the gun.) AA gun between her funnels, and two quadruple Mark I mounts for the 0.5-inch Vickers Mark III machine gun. She was fitted with two above-water quadruple torpedo tube mounts for 21-inch (533 mm) torpedoes. One depth charge rail and two throwers were fitted; 20 depth charges were originally carried, but this increased to 35 shortly after the war began.

== Construction and career ==
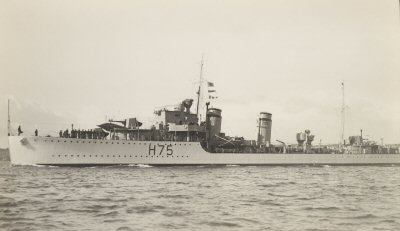
Decoy in pre-war paint

Decoy was ordered on 2 February 1931 under the 1930 Naval Estimates, and was laid down at John I. Thornycroft & Company's yard at Woolston, Southampton, on 25 June 1931. She was launched on 7 June 1932 and completed on 17 January 1933, at a total cost of £225,236, excluding equipment supplied by the Admiralty, such as weapons, ammunition and wireless equipment. The ship was initially assigned to the 1st Destroyer Flotilla in the Mediterranean and made a brief deployment to the Persian Gulf and Red Sea in September–October 1933. New torpedo tubes were fitted at Malta after her return.

The ship was refitted at Devonport Dockyard between 3 September and 20 October 1934 for service on the China Station with the 8th (later the 21st) Destroyer Flotilla and arrived there in January 1935. She was attached to the Mediterranean Fleet in the Red Sea from September 1935 to May 1936 during the Abyssinian Crisis and made port visits in Mombasa and other East African ports before returning to Hong Kong. The ship was refitted there in October and toured Southeast Asia in the first quarter of 1937. Decoy required further repairs and fumigation in April–May after her return. In August 1938 she sailed for Qingdao, carrying representatives to apologise for incidents where drunken sailors had insulted the Japanese flag. She remained in the Far East until the rise in tensions before World War II began prompted her recall in August 1939.

=== World War II ===
With the outbreak of war, Decoy was assigned to the Mediterranean Fleet and assigned to contraband control duties. In December the ship began an extensive refit to repair corrosion problems, fix her boiler feedwater pumps, and replace her funnels. After completing her repairs in January 1940, she was transferred to Freetown, joining the 20th Destroyer Flotilla, to escort convoys off the West African coast. Decoy returned to the Mediterranean Fleet in May and was assigned to the 10th Destroyer Flotilla. Together with her sister Defender, she escorted Convoy US-2 carrying Australian and New Zealand troops to the Middle East through the Red Sea from 12 to 17 May.

The ship and three other destroyers, escorted the French battleship Lorraine and three British cruisers as they bombarded Bardia during the night of 20/21 June. On 27 June 1940, Decoy participated in the sinking of the Italian submarine Console Generale Liuzzi . Together with her sisters Dainty and Defender, the destroyer Ilex, and the Australian destroyer Voyager, the ship depth charged Console Generale Liuzzi, which was then abandoned and scuttled south-east of Crete.

On 29 June 1940 Decoy participated, together with the same squadron, in the sinking of the Italian submarine Argonauta. The squadron patrolled the area between Alexandria, the Aegean Sea and the central Mediterranean from 27 to 30 June 1940 as part of Operation MA3 in support of British convoys from the Greek ports to Port Said and from Alexandria to Malta. Argonauta was probably sunk near Cape Ras el Hilal, Libya, at around 0615 hours by the British destroyers; though it is also possible the Argonauta was depth charged and sunk around 1450 hours that same day by Short Sunderland L5804 of the RAF. The Historical Bureau of the Italian Navy believes the first theory to be more believable, but doubt still persists. On 9 July 1940, she took part of the Battle of Calabria, where she was hit by splinters from a near-miss from the Italian battleship Giulio Cesare.

While returning from Operation Hats, Decoy, Ilex and the light cruisers HMS Orion and HMAS Sydney bombarded Scarpanto during the night of 3/4 September. On 6 November, Decoy, together with the destroyers Defender, Hasty, Havock, Hereward, Hero, Hyperion, Ilex, Janus, Jervis, Mohawk, and Nubian screened the capital ships of the Mediterranean Fleet, which provided distant cover for the passage of Convoy MW3 from Egypt to Malta and Convoy ME3 from Malta as part of Operation MB8. While in Alexandria, the ship was struck by a bomb that penetrated completely through the ship on 13 November.

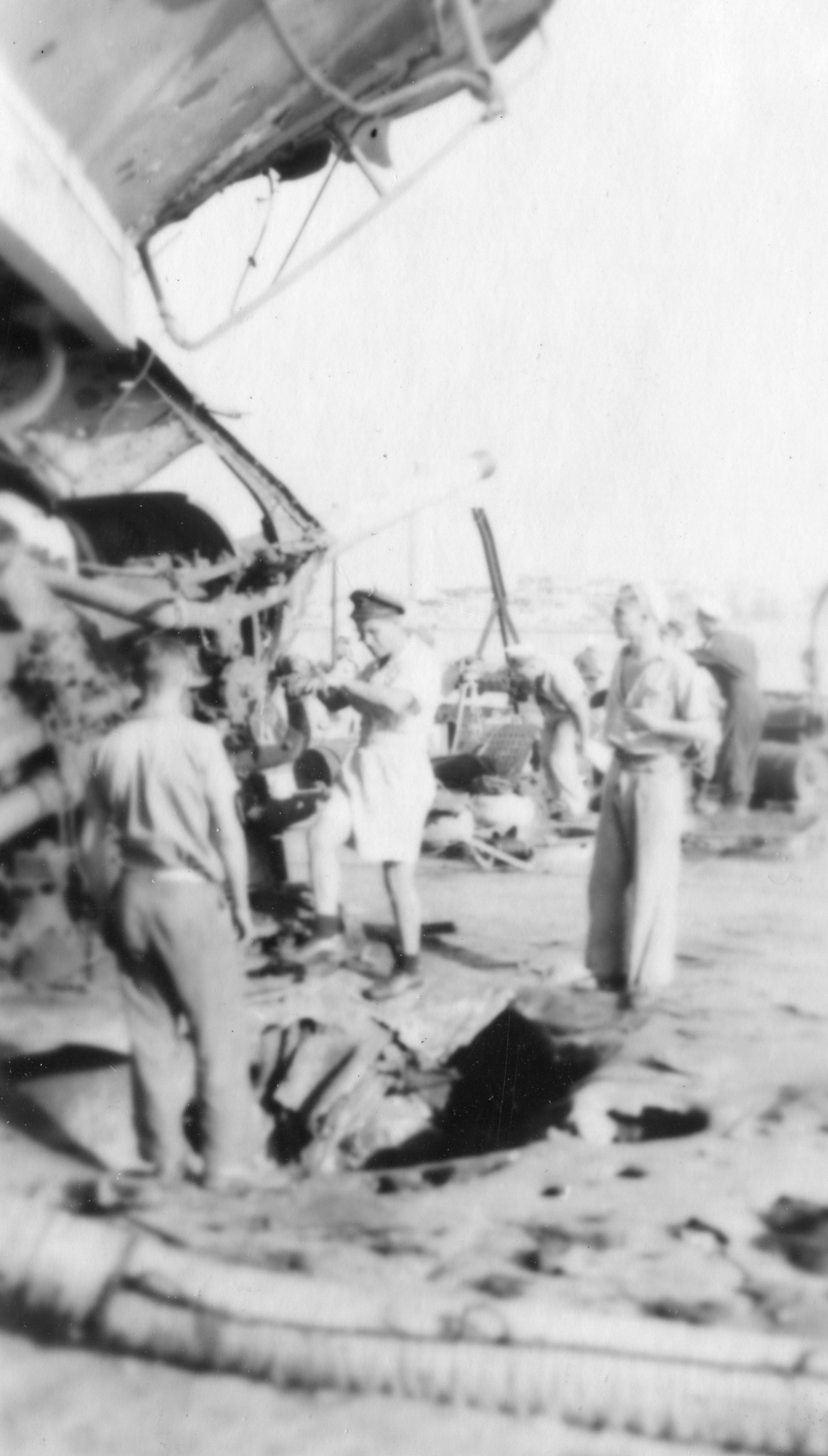
The damage to the deck from the bomb', 15 November 1940

After temporary repairs were made, she was sent to Malta for permanent repairs which lasted until 1 February 1941, after she was further damaged on 19 January. On 25 February, she participated in Operation Abstention; together with Hereward and the gunboat Ladybird, Decoy landed commandos on the island of Kastelorizo, but they were overwhelmed by an Italian counter-attack. Only a few survivors were taken off two days later.

The ship participated in Operation Demon, the evacuation of Allied troops from Greece in April, and assisted in the evacuation of troops from Crete to Egypt after the Germans invaded Crete on 22 May (Operation Merkur). That same day she was ordered along with HMS Hero, to steam for the south coast of the island. The next night, 22 May, she evacuated King George II of Greece and his entourage and sailed to Alexandria.

She spent most of the rest of the year escorting convoys to Tobruk. On 25 November, she was escorting the battleship HMS Barham when that ship was torpedoed by the German submarine U-331. Decoy was damaged in a collision the following month and was under repair at Malta from 20 December to 8 February 1942. After returning to Alexandria, she was transferred to the Eastern Fleet in the Indian Ocean where she escorted the slow ships of Force B when the Japanese carriers attacked in March–April 1942. The ship remained with the Eastern Fleet until she was ordered home to refit in September. En route, Decoy briefly operated from Freetown, but arrived at Greenock on 29 October, her first visit home since 1934.

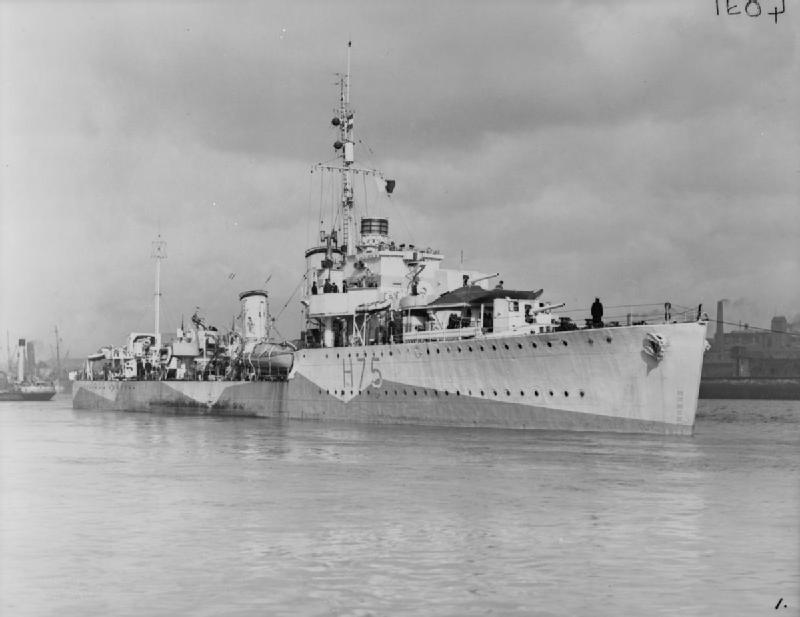
Kootenay between 1943 and 1945

The ship was refitted at the Palmers shipyard at Hebburn-on-Tyne between 3 November and 12 April 1943. Her armament was modified to accommodate additional depth charges by removing 'Y' gun and her light AA armament was increased by the addition of six 20-millimetre (0.79 in) Oerlikon guns and two Parachute and Cable projectors. A Type 286 surface-search radar were probably also fitted at this time, but 1944 this had been replaced by a Type 290 system. Before the war's end this was supplemented when her director-control tower and rangefinder above the bridge was replaced by a Type 271 target indication radar. Decoy was transferred to the Royal Canadian Navy during the refit on 1 March and was recommissioned on 12 April with the new name of HMCS Kootenay (the ship was gifted to the Canadians on 15 June). After working up, she was assigned to Escort Group C5 for convoy escort duties in the North Atlantic.

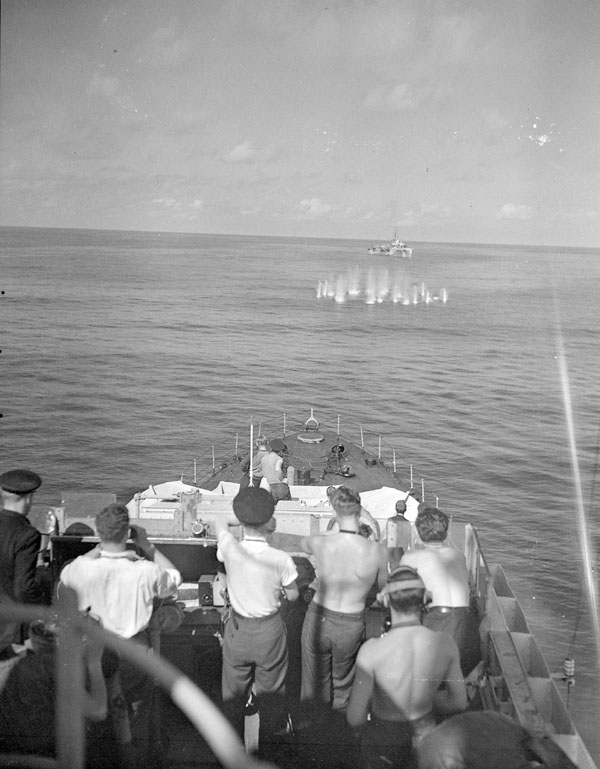
Kootenay sailors watching the explosions of Hedgehog charges fired at U-621, 18 August 1944

On 22 May 1943 Kootenay picked up 19 survivors from the Norwegian tanker Sandanger, which had been torpedoed and sunk on 12 May by U-221 in the North Atlantic. She remained with the escort group until October when she began a refit in Halifax that lasted until December, Kootenay rejoined the group upon completion of the refit. The ship was reassigned to the 11th Escort Group in May 1944 in preparation for Operation Overlord. The group was tasked to protect Allied shipping in the English Channel and the Bay of Biscay and Kootenay, together with the destroyer Ottawa and the corvette Statice, sank U-678 in the English Channel south of Brighton on 7 July 1944. Together with Ottawa and the destroyer Chaudière, the ship sank U-621 in the Bay of Biscay near La Rochelle on 18 August. Two days later, the same ships sank U-984 in the Bay of Biscay west of Brest.

Kootenay was extensively refitted between 2 October 1944 and 27 February 1945 at Shelburne Naval Dockyard and resumed anti-submarine patrols in the Channel in April after working up. After V-E day, she was used as a troop transport between Newfoundland and Quebec City until she was placed in reserve at Sydney, Nova Scotia, on 26 October. She was broken up for scrap in 1946.
