= Italian submarine Console Generale Liuzzi =

Italian submarine

Coordinates: 33°46′0″N 27°27′0″E

- The launch of Console Generale Liuzzi in 1939

History

Italy
- Name: Console Generale Liuzzi
- Builder: Tosi, Taranto
- Laid down: 1 October 1938
- Launched: 17 September 1939
- Fate: Sunk, 27 June 1940

General characteristics
- Class & type: Liuzzi-class submarine
- Displacement: 1,166 tons surfaced; 1,484 dived
- Length: 252.5 ft (77.0 m)
- Beam: 23 ft (7.0 m)
- Draught: 13.7 ft (4.2 m)
- Propulsion: 2 × Tosi diesels; 2 × Ansaldo electric motors
- Speed: 18 kn (33 km/h) (surfaced)
- Complement: 58
- Armament: 1 × 100 mm (4 in) deck gun; 4 × 13.2mm machine-guns; 8 × 21-inch torpedo tubes

Console Generale Liuzzi was an Italian Liuzzi-class ocean-going submarine of the Regia Marina, launched in 1939 and sunk in 1940 by Royal Navy destroyers. It was named after Alberto Liuzzi (1898–1937), a console generale (brigadier general) of the Blackshirts.

== Design ==
=== Armament ===
The four submarines of the Liuzzi-class were armed with a single 100 mm (4 in) deck gun, four 13.2 mm (0.52 in) machine guns in twin mounts and eight 21 in (53 cm) torpedo tubes, with four reloads for a total of twelve torpedoes carried.

== History ==
Liuzzi was built at the Tosi Shipyard in Taranto. She was laid down on 1 October 1938 and launched on 17 September 1939.

=== Loss ===
Liuzzi was attacked on 27 June 1940 by the British destroyers Dainty, Ilex, Decoy, Defender and the Australian destroyer Voyager south of Crete; fatally damaged, she was abandoned and scuttled. Her commanding officer at the time of the attack was Capitano di Corvetta Lorenzo Bezzi. He received the Italian Navy Gold Medal in recognition of the choice to go down with his ship after ordering his crew to abandon the sinking submarine.

== Legacy ==
Even if the submarine was destroyed without sinking any enemy ships, it is remembered because of the sacrifice of its commander Lorenzo Bezzi. The Italian Submarine Naval school in Taranto was named in his honour.
