= HMAS Voyager (D31) =

W-class destroyer of the British Royal Navy and Royal Australian Navy

Coordinates: 9°15′S 125°45′E

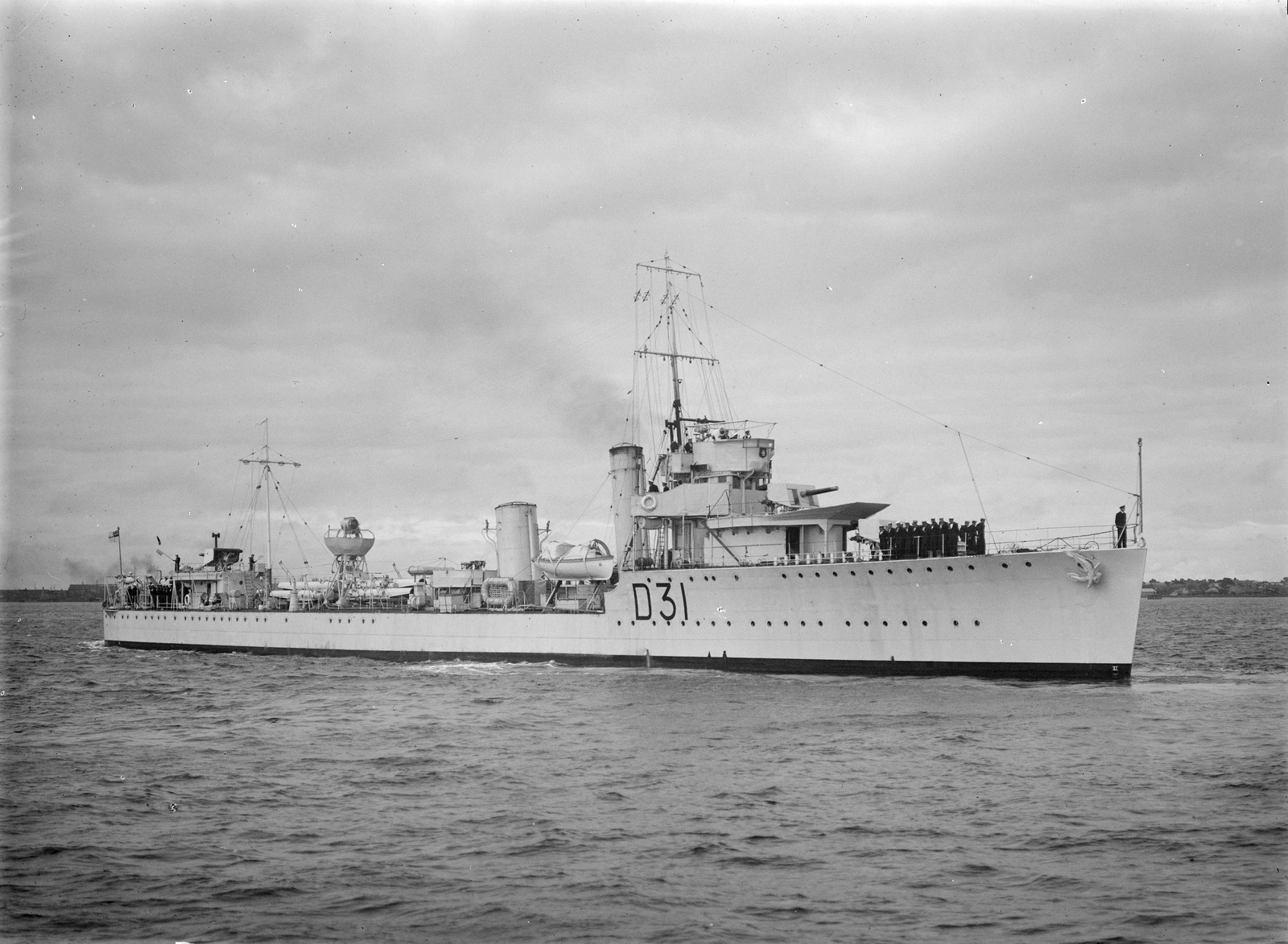
- HMAS Voyager

History

United Kingdom
- Name: Voyager
- Builder: Alexander Stephens and Sons
- Laid down: 17 May 1917
- Launched: 8 May 1918
- Commissioned: 24 June 1918
- Decommissioned: 11 October 1933
- Fate: Transferred to RAN

Australia
- Name: Voyager
- Acquired: 11 October 1933
- Commissioned: 11 October 1933
- Decommissioned: 14 April 1936
- Recommissioned: 26 April 1938
- Honours and awards: Battle honours: Darwin 1942; Calabria 1940; Libya 1940–41; Greece 1941; Crete 1941; Mediterranean 1941; Pacific 1942
- Fate: Ran aground 23 September 1942, scuttled
- Badge

General characteristics
- Class & type: W-class destroyer
- Displacement: 1,100 tons standard; 1,470 tons full load
- Length: 312 ft 1 in (95.1 m) length overall; 300 ft (91.4 m) between perpendiculars
- Beam: 29 ft 6 in (9.0 m)
- Draught: 14 ft 7 in (4.4 m)
- Propulsion: 3 × Yarrow boilers, 2 × Brown-Curtis turbines, 27,000 shp (20,000 kW), two shafts
- Speed: 34 knots (63 km/h; 39 mph)
- Range: 2,600 nautical miles (4,800 km; 3,000 mi) at 15 knots (28 km/h; 17 mph)
- Complement: 6 officers, 113 sailors
- Armament: 4 × QF 4-inch Mk V guns; 1 × QF 2-pounder naval gun (later increased to 2); 5 × .303 inch machine guns; 2 × 3-tube 21 inch (533 mm) torpedo sets (1 later removed); 2 × Oerlikon 20 mm cannon; Depth charge chutes and throwers

HMAS Voyager (D31/I31) (formerly HMS Voyager (G36/G16/D31)) was a W-class destroyer of the Royal Navy (RN) and Royal Australian Navy (RAN). Commissioned into the RN in 1918, the destroyer remained in RN service until 1933, when she was transferred to the RAN. Recommissioned, Voyager served in the Mediterranean and Pacific theatres of World War II until 23 September 1942, when she ran aground while trying to deliver troops to Timor. The ship was damaged by Japanese bombers while trying to refloat, then was scuttled by her crew.

== Design and construction ==
Voyager was a W-class destroyer constructed for the Royal Navy during World War I. The ship had a displacement of 1,100 tons at standard load, and 1,470 tons at full load. She was 312 feet 1.375 inches (95.13253 m) in length overall and 300 feet (91 m) long between perpendiculars, with a beam of 29 feet 6 inches (8.99 m), and a maximum draught of 14 feet 6.75 inches (4.4387 m). Propulsion machinery consisted of three Yarrow boilers feeding two Brown-Curtis turbines, which provided 27,000 shaft horsepower (20,000 kW) to the two propeller shafts. Maximum designed speed was 34 knots (63 km/h; 39 mph). Voyager had a range of 2,600 nautical miles (4,800 km; 3,000 mi) at 15 knots (28 km/h; 17 mph). The ship's company consisted of 6 officers and 113 sailors.

At launch, Voyager's main armament consisted of four single QF 4-inch Mark V guns. This was supplemented by a quad-barrelled QF 2-pounder naval gun, and five .303 inch machine guns of various types. The destroyer was also fitted with two 3-tube 21 inch (533 mm) torpedo sets, two depth charge chutes, and four depth charge throwers. Later modifications to her armament included the installation of a second 2-pounder gun and two Oerlikon 20 mm cannon, and the removal of one of the torpedo tube sets.

Voyager was laid down by Alexander Stephen and Sons at their shipyard in Glasgow, Scotland on 17 May 1917. She was launched on 8 May 1918. The destroyer was commissioned into the Royal Navy on 24 June 1918, the day of her completion. (Note: Voyager was commissioned on 8 June 1918, prior to her completion on 24 June, according to English.) Voyager was the only ship of her class that carried a name starting with "V": the rest of the W class had names starting with "W".

== Operational history ==
In July 1918, Voyager joined the 11th Destroyer Flotilla of the Grand Fleet. She remained part of the 11th Flotilla through the end of the War until the flotilla was disbanded in March 1919, then transferring to the newly established 1st Destroyer Flotilla of the Atlantic Fleet. On 22 April 1919, Voyager took part in a visit to the French port of Cherbourg by 13 British warships, including the battleships Barham, Malaya, Valiant and Warspite.

In June 1919, Voyager was deployed to the Baltic Sea as part of the British intervention in the Russian Civil War. On 2 June, Voyager and the destroyer Vivacious were patrolling off Petrograd when they clashed with the Russian destroyers Azard and Gavriil, exchanging gunfire at long range across a minefield, with no damage occurring on either side. On 12 October, the 1st Flotilla was ordered to return to the Baltic shortly after returning to Britain, and between 150 and 200 men from the destroyers of the flotilla, including Voyager, refused to prepare their ships for sea, with 79 men not returning to their ships. The ships' crews were made up with men from the Atlantic Fleet's battleships to allow them to depart as ordered. On 25 October, the 1st Flotilla relieved the 20th Destroyer Flotilla at the Latvian cities of Riga and Liepāja, which were being attacked by Baltic German forces of the West Russian Volunteer Army. On 28 October, Voyager fired 20 rounds at Baltic German infantry positions near Riga, and from 3 November, together with Velox and the cruiser Dragon, provided artillery support for a Latvian offensive that drove the Baltic German forces away from Riga, the artillery support continuing until 10 November, when the retreating enemy were out of range of the British guns. On 16 November, Voyager carried a load of field guns and ammunition from Riga to Liepāja, where after heavy fighting, the Latvians, supported by the Royal Navy, had beaten back more attacks by the West Russian Volunteer Army.

Voyager was deployed to Irish waters in May 1920 and January–March 1921, during the Irish War of Independence. In January 1922, Voyager transferred to the 5th Destroyer Flotilla, and in February the same year, took part in Atlantic Fleet exercises in the Mediterranean, followed by a series of port visits. In 1925, the 5th Flotilla, including Voyager transferred to the Mediterranean Fleet and was renamed the 1st Destroyer Flotilla. On 17 July 1928, Voyager was in collision with the destroyer Vendetta while on passage between Crete and Skyros. Both destroyers received minor damage, and underwent temporary repairs by the depot ship Sandhurst, with more permanent repairs being made at Malta. Voyager was refitted at Devonport between 3 May and 15 June 1929, returning to the Mediterranean in July that year. Her stay there was short, however, as on 6 November, the destroyer left Malta for Britain, arriving at Sheerness on 15 November, where her crew transferred to the destroyer Waterhen. Voyager had her boilers retubed at Chatham from January to September 1930, before returning the Mediterranean to rejoin the 1st Flotilla. Voyager remained part of the 1st Flotilla until December 1932, when she was replaced by the newly-built Dainty. Voyager was reduced to reserve at Portsmouth on 17 January 1933.

=== Transfer to RAN ===
In 1933, the British Admiralty decided to replace five S-class destroyers on loan to the RAN with five more capable (but slightly older) destroyers. Voyager was one of the five ships selected, and was commissioned into the RAN at Portsmouth on 11 October 1933. The ships arrived in Australia on 21 December 1933, and Voyager undertook routine peacetime duties until she was placed in reserve on 14 April 1936. The destroyer was recommissioned on 26 April 1938, and was involved in training cruises until the start of World War II.

=== World War II ===
On 14 October 1939, Voyager left Sydney. It was originally intended for the Flotilla to be based in Singapore, but en route it was decided that the ships would be of more use in the Mediterranean. The arrival of the Australian Destroyer Flotilla was met with derision in Germany, with Nazi propaganda minister Joseph Goebbels referring to Voyager and her sister ships as "Australia's Scrap Iron Flotilla", a moniker the ships quickly adopted.

Voyager commenced operations on 1 January 1940, initially as a convoy escort operating out of Alexandria. The ship was docked at Malta for refit during April. On 13 June and again on 19 June, Voyager attacked submarines without success, but on 27 June she attacked the Italian submarine Console Generale Liuzzi off Crete with the British destroyers Dainty, Ilex, Decoy, and Defender, forcing the Italians to surrender and scuttle their vessel. Two days later, the Allied ships encountered the Italian submarine Uebi Scebeli and sank her after capturing the crew. On 9 July, Voyager was involved in the Battle of Calabria, as escort to the carrier HMS Eagle. A day later, she was assigned to escort a convoy from Malta to Alexandria.

On 23 July, there was a brief mutiny aboard the destroyer, when 12 sailors sat down outside their mess deck and refused to move until their issue was addressed. Two alternate issues have been described as the source of the protest: one was the state of the ship's armament, which was not configured for anti-aircraft warfare, the other was orders to repaint the ship in camouflage, which would have prevented any chance for shore leave. The captain came down to the sailors and resolved their problem through discussion, although he made no official record of the cause of the mutiny or its solution, and also pressed no charges against the sailors. The destroyer remained near Alexandria until September, when she returned to Malta for refit. In October, Voyager transported supplies to help establish a base on Crete following the Italian invasion of Greece. The rest of 1940 was spent escorting the Malta Convoys and providing support to ground forces involved in the Libyan campaign.

In March 1941, Voyager was involved in Operation Lustre, the Allied reinforcement of Greece. The turn of fortune against the Allies in April required the evacuation of most of these forces; Operation Demon. On 21 April, Voyager was in Navplion, and accounted for the evacuation of 301 people, including 160 nurses. Following this, the ship became involved with the Tobruk Ferry Service, and made 11 runs to the besieged city of Tobruk before engine problems forced her withdrawal in July. Voyager sailed to Sydney for refitting; the first ship of the Scrap Iron Flotilla to leave the Mediterranean. After the completion of the refit, which lasted from September 1941 to March 1942, Voyager commenced convoy escort duties in Australian waters.

== Loss ==
Following the capture of Timor by the Japanese in February 1942, and despite initial appearances that all Allied soldiers were captured or killed, it became evident that the 2/2nd Independent Company, supported by other surviving Australian and Dutch troops, were mounting a guerrilla campaign against the Japanese. Throughout late 1942, a haphazard supply service began, and Voyager became involved when a sizable troop landing (400 commandos from 2/4th Independent Company) and evacuation (the 2/2nd, plus any Portuguese women and children) was planned for September 1942: the need for a large capacity, speed, and surprise requiring the use of a destroyer.

The 2/4th boarded at Darwin on 22 September 1942, along with supplies and barges to convey them ashore. The planned landing place was Betano Bay, where Voyager anchored at 18:30 on 23 September. The destroyer's position was not the best, and as the soldiers began to disembark over the port side into the barges, Voyager's commanding officer decided to reorient the ship. As the anchor was raised, a surge in the current pushed the ship towards the shore. Unable to use the port propeller shaft to push the destroyer away from the shore as the landing craft would have been swamped and dragged into the propeller, the commander attempted to swing Voyager around with the starboard shaft. Voyager was unable to complete the turn, with the ship running aground at the stern. Attempts to lighten the ship and float her free failed, and by the next morning's high tide, the stern and propeller shafts were embedded in the sand.

At 13:30 on 24 September, the beached ship was spotted by two Japanese aircraft; the bomber shot down, but the escorting fighter escaped to report. At 16:00 a flight of Japanese bombers attacked the ship and the beach. The destroyer was damaged beyond recovery, and while none of the ship's company were injured, their alcohol supply – which had been brought ashore during the refloating attempts – was destroyed by a bomb. After the air attack, the Voyager personnel signalled Darwin to explain the ship's loss and request evacuation; they were retrieved by the corvettes Kalgoorlie and Warrnambool at 20:00 on 25 September. The Australian and Dutch troops on Timor were evacuated in December 1942 by the HNLMS Tjerk Hiddes.

The destroyer's wartime service is recognised with seven battle honours: "Darwin 1942", "Calabria 1940", "Libya 1940–41", "Greece 1941", "Crete 1941", "Mediterranean 1941", and "Pacific 1942".
