= HMS Defender (H07) =

British D-class destroyer

Coordinates: 31°45′N 25°31′E

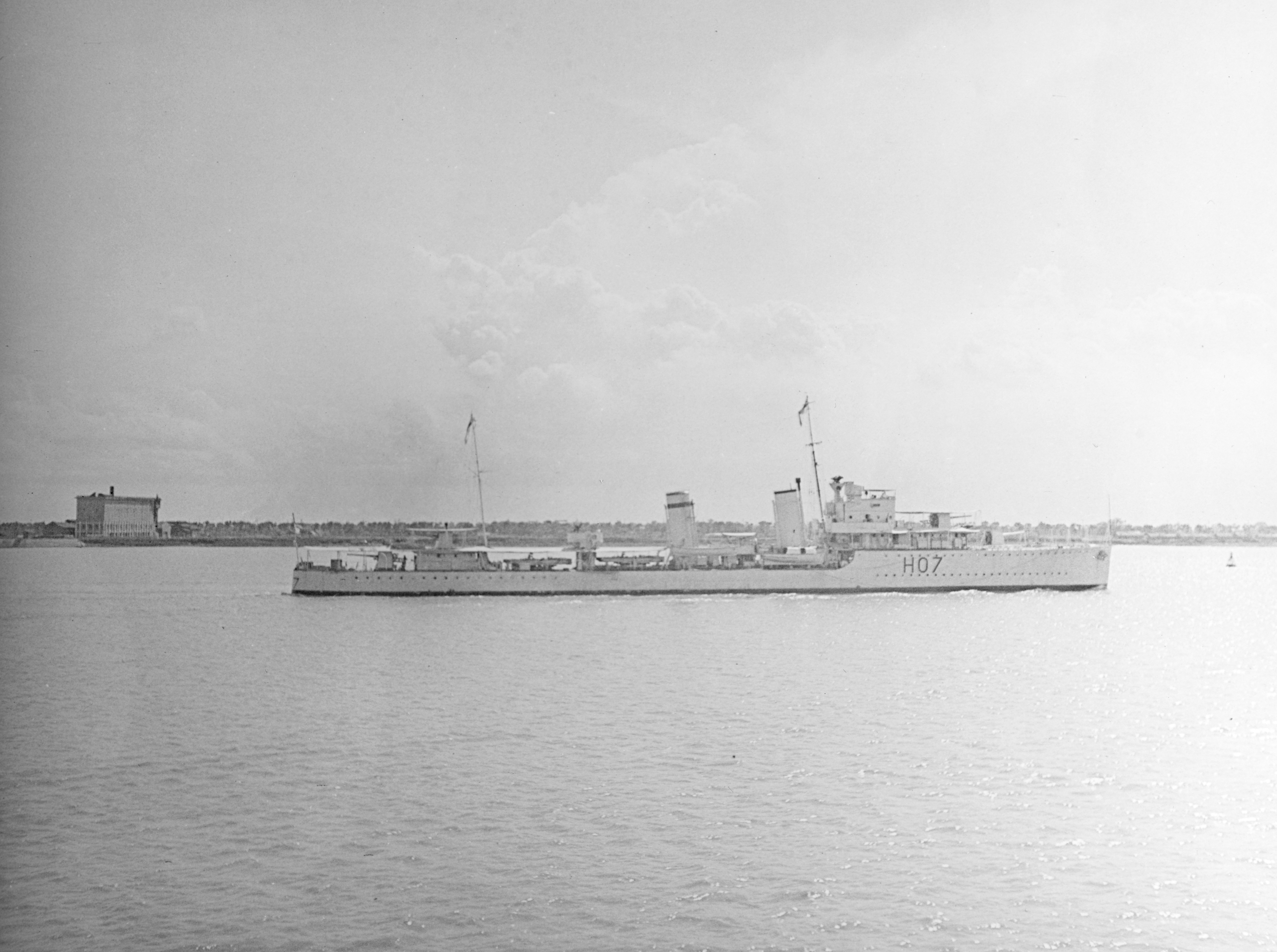

History

United Kingdom
- Name: HMS Defender
- Ordered: 2 February 1931
- Builder: Vickers Armstrong, Barrow in Furness
- Cost: £223,979
- Yard number: 674
- Laid down: 22 June 1931
- Launched: 7 April 1932
- Completed: 31 October 1932
- Motto: Fendendo vince; ("By defence I conquer")
- Honours and awards: Calabria 1940, Spartivento 1940, Matapan 1941, Malta Convoys 1941, Greece 1941, Crete 1941, Libya 1941
- Fate: Sunk on 11 July 1941
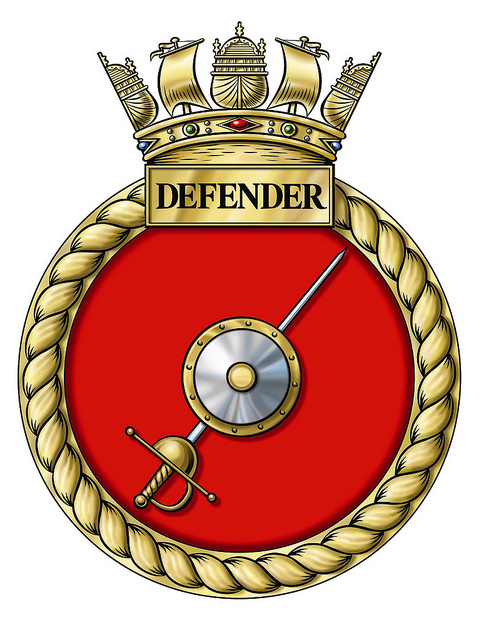
- Badge

General characteristics as built
- Class & type: D-class destroyer
- Displacement: 1,375 long tons (1,397 t) (standard); 1,890 long tons (1,920 t) (deep)
- Length: 329 ft (100.3 m) o/a
- Beam: 33 ft (10.1 m)
- Draught: 12 ft 6 in (3.8 m)
- Installed power: 3 × Admiralty 3-drum boilers; 36,000 shp (27,000 kW)
- Propulsion: 2 × shafts; 2 × geared steam turbines
- Speed: 36 knots (67 km/h; 41 mph)
- Range: 5,870 nmi (10,870 km; 6,760 mi) at 15 knots (28 km/h; 17 mph)
- Complement: 145
- Sensors & processing systems: ASDIC
- Armament: 4 × single 4.7 in (120 mm) guns; 1 × single 12-pdr (3 in (76.2 mm)) AA gun; 2 × single 2-pdr (40 mm (1.6 in)) AA guns; 2 × quadruple 21 in (533 mm) torpedo tubes; 20 × depth charges, 1 rail and 2 throwers

HMS Defender was a D-class destroyer built for the Royal Navy in the early 1930s. The ship was initially assigned to the Mediterranean Fleet before she was transferred to the China Station in early 1935. She was temporarily deployed in the Red Sea during late 1935 during the Abyssinia Crisis, before returning to her assigned station where she remained until mid-1939. Defender was transferred back to the Mediterranean Fleet just before World War II began in September 1939. She briefly was assigned to West Africa for convoy escort duties in 1940 before returning to the Mediterranean. The ship took part in the Battles of Calabria, Cape Spartivento, and Cape Matapan over the next year without damage. Defender assisted in the evacuations from Greece and Crete in April–May 1941, before she began running supply missions to Tobruk, Libya in June. The ship was badly damaged by a German bomber on one of those missions and had to be scuttled by her consort on 11 July 1941.

== Description ==
Defender displaced 1,375 long tons (1,397 t) at standard load and 1,890 long tons (1,920 t) at deep load. The ship had an overall length of 329 feet (100.3 m), a beam of 33 feet (10.1 m) and a draught of 12 feet 6 inches (3.8 m). She was powered by Parsons geared steam turbines, driving two shafts, which developed a total of 36,000 shaft horsepower (27,000 kW) and gave a maximum speed of 36 knots (67 km/h; 41 mph). Steam for the turbines was provided by three Admiralty 3-drum water-tube boilers. Defender carried a maximum of 473 long tons (481 t) of fuel oil that gave her a range of 5,870 nautical miles (10,870 km; 6,760 mi) at 15 knots (28 km/h; 17 mph). The ship's complement was 145 officers and men.

The ship mounted four 45-calibre 4.7-inch Mark IX guns in single mounts. For anti-aircraft (AA) defence, Diamond had a single 12-pounder (3-inch (76.2 mm)) gun between her funnels and two 40-millimetre (1.6 in) QF 2-pounder Mark II guns mounted on the side of her bridge. She was fitted with two above-water quadruple torpedo tube mounts for 21-inch torpedoes. One depth charge rail and two throwers were fitted; 20 depth charges were originally carried, but this increased to 35 shortly after the war began.

== Construction and career ==
Ordered on 2 February 1931 under the 1930 Naval Programme, Defender was laid down at the Vickers Armstrongs yard in Barrow as yard number 674 on 22 June 1931, and launched on 7 April 1932. She was completed on 31 October 1932 having cost a total of £223,979, excluding the Admiralty supplied equipment such as guns, ammunition and wireless outfits. The ship was initially assigned to the 1st Destroyer Flotilla in the Mediterranean and made a brief deployment to the Persian Gulf and Red Sea in September–November 1933.

Defender was refitted at Devonport Dockyard between 3 September and 23 October 1934 for service on the China Station with the 8th Destroyer Flotilla and arrived at Hong Kong in January 1935. The ship was attached to the Mediterranean Fleet in the Red Sea from November 1935 to June 1936 during the Abyssinian Crisis and then visited ports in East Africa for a month before returning to the China Station. Her boilers had to be retubed at Singapore between 5 November 1938 and 26 January 1939 and her superheaters were repaired at Hong Kong from 31 January to 14 March.

With the outbreak of war, Defender was assigned to the Mediterranean Fleet and arrived in Alexandria on 19 September. She was assigned to contraband control duties until she was transferred to Gibraltar in January 1940. The ship patrolled the Portuguese coast until she was transferred to Freetown in mid-February to escort convoys off the West African coast. Defender was transferred back to Gibraltar in April, escorting the light cruiser Neptune en route, and arrived there on 23 April 1940. The next month, she joined the 10th Destroyer Flotilla of the Mediterranean Fleet and escorted Convoy US-2 carrying Australian and New Zealand troops to the Middle East through the Red Sea from 12 to 17 May.

On 27 June, together with sisters Dainty and Decoy, with the destroyers Ilex and HMAS Voyager, she sank the Italian submarine Console Generale Liuzzi south east of Crete. Defender took part in the Battle of Calabria on 9 July as an escort for the heavy ships of Force C and unsuccessfully engaged Italian destroyers without suffering any damage. Together with her sisters Dainty and Diamond, the Australian destroyer Stuart, and the light cruisers Capetown and Liverpool, she escorted Convoy AN.2 from Egypt to various ports in the Aegean Sea in late July.

On 6 November, Defender, together with the destroyers Decoy, Hasty, Havock, Hereward, Hero, Hyperion, Ilex, Janus, Jervis, Mohawk, and Nubian screened the capital ships of the Mediterranean Fleet, which provided distant cover for the passage of Convoy MW3 from Egypt to Malta and Convoy ME3 from Malta as part of Operation MB8. During Operation Collar in late November, Defender, the anti-aircraft cruiser Coventry and four other destroyers sailed from Alexandria to rendezvous with a convoy coming from Gibraltar. After reaching Malta on 26 November, the destroyers joined the battleship Ramillies, and the light cruisers Berwick and Newcastle of Force D and sailed to rendezvous with Force H, also coming from Gibraltar. The next day, after the British forces had combined, they were spotted by the Italians and the inconclusive Battle of Cape Spartivento was fought.

On 7 January 1941, Defender escorted Convoy MW.5 with her sister Diamond and the anti-aircraft cruiser Calcutta from Alexandria to Malta during Operation Excess. The ship was refitted in Malta from 4 February to 19 March, and took part in the Battle of Cape Matapan on 27–29 March. She took part in Operation Demon, the evacuation of Allied troops from Greece. On 27 April 1941 Defender and the destroyers Hereward, and Hero, and cruiser HMS Phoebe, covered Convoy GA.14 as it left Souda Bay, Crete, for Alexandria. A German air attack sank the Dutch troop ship Costa Rica, but Defender, Hereward, Hero and Phoebe rescued all her crew and all 2,600 soldiers. She then escorted Convoy GA.15 on 29–30 April from Souda Bay to Alexandria. An Italian destroyer and two torpedo boats attacked the convoy at night as it was transiting Kaso Strait east of Crete, but were rebuffed by the escorts without inflicting any damage. The following month Defender assisted in the evacuation of troops from Crete to Egypt after the Germans invaded on 22 May (Operation Merkur).

On 10 June, Defender, and the other three ships of the 10th Destroyer Flotilla, arrived off the Lebanese coast to reinforce Royal Navy forces supporting Operation Exporter, the invasion of Vichy French-controlled Syria and Lebanon, but the ship was not engaged during her time off Lebanon and Syria. Later that month, she began escorting convoys to and from Tobruk and on 29 June the Australian destroyer Waterhen was badly damaged by Italian Junkers Ju 87 "Stuka" dive bombers off Tobruk. Defender took Waterhen in tow, but the next day she capsized and sank.

=== Loss ===
On 11 July 1941, Defender was returning from Tobruk in company with the Australian destroyer Vendetta. They were attacked by a single Junkers Ju 88 bomber of I./Lehrgeschwader 1 piloted by Gerhard Stamp on a reconnaissance flight along the coast before dawn. The bomber scored a near-miss on Defender which detonated under the ship, just forward of the engine room. The shock broke the ship's back and flooded the engine room, although there were no casualties among her crew or passengers. Vendetta took Defender in tow, leaving a skeleton crew aboard the damaged ship, but she started to break up and Vendetta was forced to scuttle her with a torpedo and gunfire off Sidi Barrani about five hours later.
