= HMS Hereward (H93) =

H-class destroyer

Coordinates: 35°20′N 26°20′E

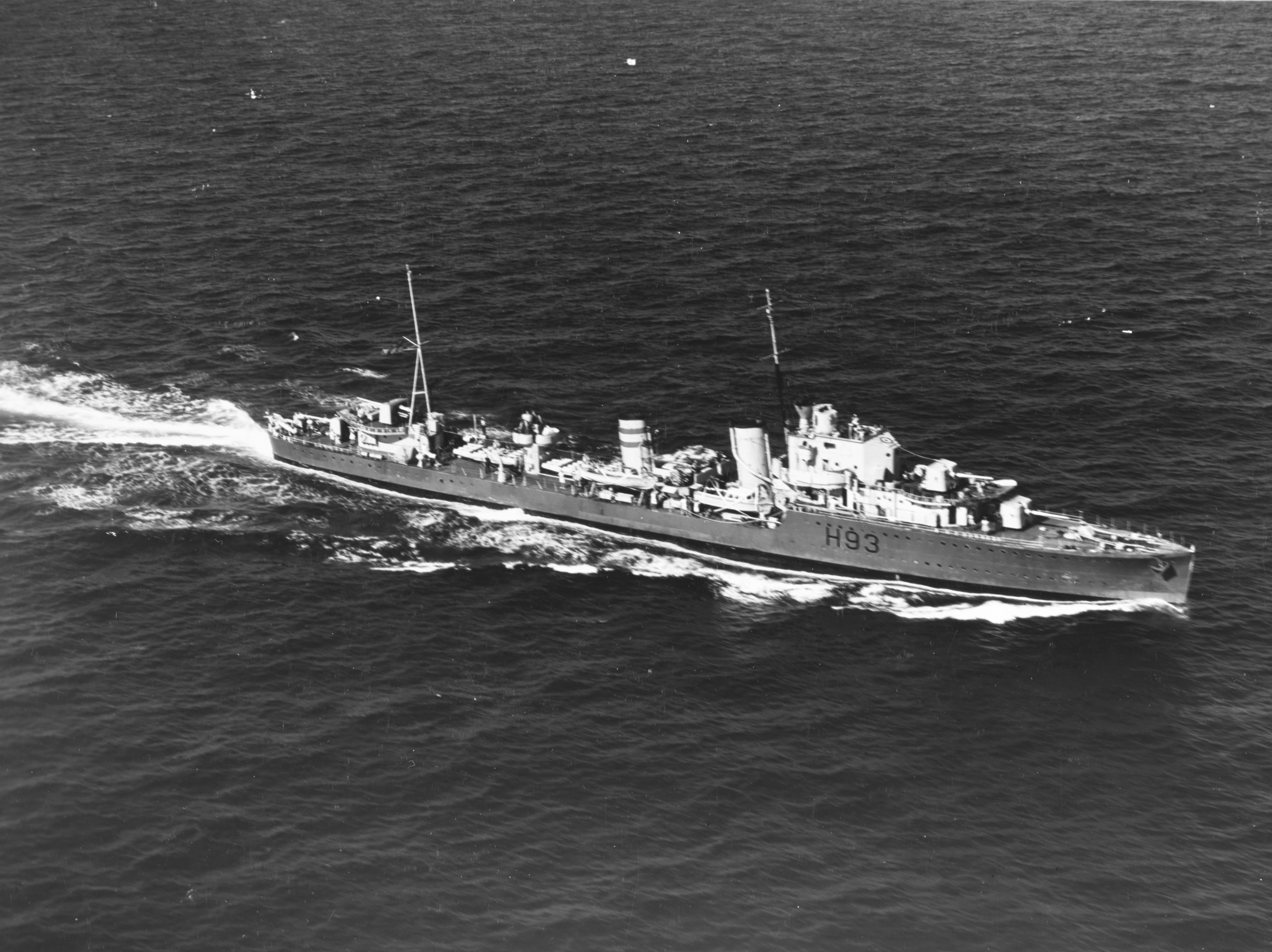
- Hereward underway, 20 December 1939

History

United Kingdom
- Name: Hereward
- Builder: Vickers-Armstrongs, High Walker
- Laid down: 28 February 1935
- Launched: 10 March 1936
- Completed: 9 December 1936
- Identification: Pennant number: H93
- Motto: 'Vigila et ora' ('Watch and pray')
- Fate: Sunk by aircraft, 29 May 1941

General characteristics as built
- Class & type: H-class destroyer
- Displacement: 1,350 long tons (1,370 t) (standard); 1,883 long tons (1,913 t) (deep load)
- Length: 323 ft (98.5 m)
- Beam: 33 ft (10.1 m)
- Draught: 12 ft 5 in (3.8 m)
- Installed power: 3 Admiralty 3-drum boilers; 34,000 shp (25,000 kW)
- Propulsion: 2 shafts, 2 geared steam turbines
- Speed: 36 knots (67 km/h; 41 mph)
- Range: 5,530 nmi (10,240 km; 6,360 mi) at 15 knots (28 km/h; 17 mph)
- Complement: 137 (peacetime), 146 (wartime)
- Sensors & processing systems: ASDIC
- Armament: 4 × single 4.7 in (120 mm) guns; 2 × quadruple .50 cal (12.7 mm) machine guns; 2 × quadruple 21 in (533 mm) torpedo tubes; 1 × depth charge rail, 2 throwers and 20 × depth charges

HMS Hereward, named after Hereward the Wake, was a H-class destroyer built for the Royal Navy in the mid-1930s. She was assigned to the Mediterranean Fleet and spent four months in Spanish waters during the Spanish Civil War in mid-1937, enforcing the arms blockade imposed by Britain and France on both sides of the conflict. When Second World War began in September 1939, the ship was in the Mediterranean but was shortly transferred to the South Atlantic to hunt for German commerce raiders and blockade runners, capturing one of the latter in November. Hereward was transferred to the Home Fleet in May 1940 and rescued Queen Wilhelmina of the Netherlands after the Germans had invaded.

The ship was transferred back to the Mediterranean Fleet later that month and escorted convoys to Malta and larger ships of the fleet. She sank an Italian submarine in December before sinking the Italian torpedo boat Vega the following month. Hereward took part in the Battle of Cape Matapan in March 1941 and assisted in evacuate Allied troops from Greece in April. In May, the ship sank several small ships in a German convoy attempting to land troops on Crete. Later that month, she was bombed and sunk by German dive bombers as she assisted in the evacuating Allied troops from Crete. Her survivors and a number of evacuees were rescued by Italian vessels and became prisoners of war.

== Description ==
Hereward displaced 1,350 long tons (1,370 t) at standard standard load and 1,883 long tons (1,913 t) at deep load. The ship had an overall length of 323 feet (98.5 m), a beam of 33 feet (10.1 m), and a draught of 12 feet 5 inches (3.8 m). She was powered by Parsons geared steam turbines, driving two shafts, which developed a total of 34,000 shaft horsepower (25,000 kW) and gave a maximum speed of 36 knots (67 km/h; 41 mph). Steam for the turbines was provided by three Admiralty 3-drum water-tube boilers. Hereward carried a maximum of 470 long tons (480 t) of fuel oil giving her a range of 5,530 nautical miles (10,240 km; 6,360 mi) at 15 knots (28 km/h; 17 mph). The ship's complement was 137 officers and men in peacetime, but increased to 146 in wartime.

The ship mounted four 45-calibre 4.7-inch (120 mm) Mk IX guns in single mounts. For anti-aircraft (AA) defence, Hereward had two quadruple Mark I mounts for the 0.5 inch Vickers Mk III machine gun. She was fitted with two above-water quadruple torpedo tube mounts for 21-inch torpedoes. One depth charge rail and two throwers were fitted; 20 depth charges were originally carried but this increased to 35 shortly after the war began. Beginning in mid-1940, the ship's anti-aircraft armament was increased, although when the modifications were made is not known. The rear set of torpedo tubes was replaced by a 12-pounder AA gun.

== Service ==
The ship was laid down by the High Walker Yard of Vickers-Armstrongs at Newcastle-on-Tyne on 28 February 1935, launched on 10 March 1936, and completed on 9 December 1936. Excluding government-furnished equipment like armament, the ship cost £249,591. She tested the twin-gun mounting intended for use on the Tribal-class destroyers in January–March 1937 at Gibraltar. It was removed at the end of the trials and her two forward guns were replaced immediately afterwards. The ship was then assigned to the 2nd Destroyer Flotilla of the Mediterranean Fleet and began patrolling Spanish waters in the Mediterranean, enforcing the Non-Intervention Agreement during the Spanish Civil War. Hereward was refitted in Malta from 30 September to 30 October 1937 and again a year later, this time in Portsmouth Dockyard in June–July 1939, and she returned to the Mediterranean afterwards.

Hereward was transferred to Freetown to hunt for German commerce raiders in the South Atlantic with Force K in October. The ship and her sister ships Hardy, Hasty, and Hostile rendezvoused with the battlecruiser Renown, the aircraft carrier Ark Royal, and the light cruiser Neptune on 17 December. They refueled in Rio de Janeiro, Brazil, before proceeding to the estuary of the River Plate in case the damaged German pocket battleship Admiral Graf Spee attempted to escape from Montevideo, Uruguay, where she had taken refuge after losing the Battle of the River Plate. Hereward captured the German blockade runner Uhenfels on 5 November. The ship was based at Trinidad from 20 November to 23 January 1940 and blockaded the German merchant ship Arauca in Port Everglades, Florida, whilst based there. She escorted the battleship Valiant to Halifax, but suffered weather damage en route that required three weeks for repairs. Hereward then escorted the light cruiser Orion to the UK as the latter carried the ashes of John Buchan, Governor General of Canada, home. She required further repairs at Portsmouth upon arrival and missed the Battles of Narvik in April.

Hereward escorted ships into Scheveningen, Netherlands on 11 May to evacuate British citizens after the Germans invaded the previous day. She evacuated Queen Wilhelmina and her family from the Netherlands on 13 May, and was transferred to the Mediterranean Fleet a few days later. The ship arrived at Alexandria on 24 May and began escorting convoys and larger ships of the fleet. Hereward took part in the Battle of Calabria in July 1940, where she was hit by splinters from a near-miss by the Italian battleship Giulio Cesare. The ship escorted a convoy during Operation Collar and then fired at retreating Italians in Cyrenaica after the Battle of Sidi Barrani. Together with her sister ship Hyperion, she sank the Italian submarine Naiade on 13 December. Hereward escorted the battleships of the Mediterranean Fleet as they bombarded Valona on 19 December and then sortied into the North Atlantic when Convoy WS-5A reported that it had been attacked by the German cruiser Admiral Hipper on 25 December. She escorted three of the convoy's ship to Gibraltar on 29 December.

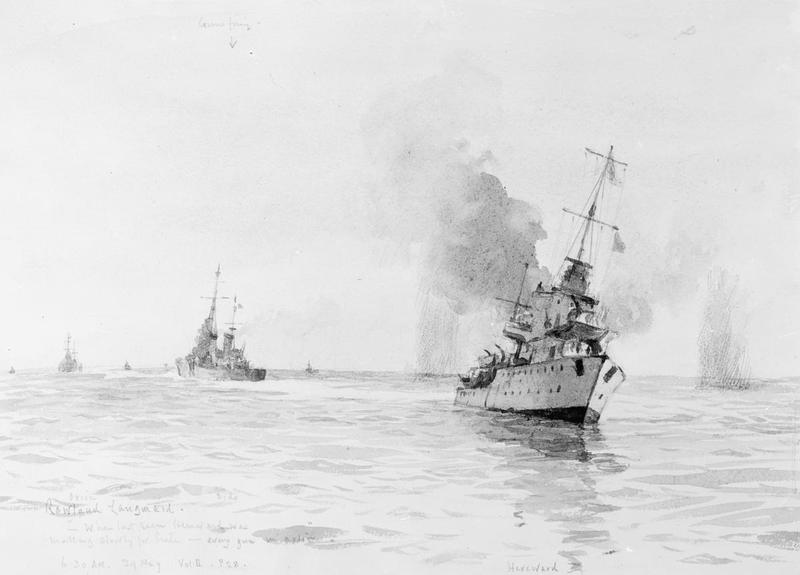
Hereward (foreground) depicted on the day of her sinking in a painting by Rowland Langmaid

The ship took part in Operation Excess in early January 1941 and sank the Italian torpedo boat Vega on 10 January with a torpedo in the Strait of Sicily. Together with the destroyer Decoy and the gunboat Ladybird, Hereward landed commandos on the island of Kastelorizo as part of Operation Abstention, but they were overwhelmed by an Italian counter-attack. Only a few survivors were taken off two days later. The ship took part in the Battle of Cape Matapan in early March 1941 and the evacuation of Greece in April 1941. Hereward, her sister ship Hero, the destroyer Defender and cruiser Phoebe rescued all the crew and all 2,600 troops from the Dutch troop ship Costa Rica on 27 April. She sank a number of fishing boats transporting German troops to Crete on 21 May, and helped evacuate the Allied garrison of Heraklion on 29 May carrying 450 troops on board. Later that day she was attacked by German Ju 87 Stuka dive bombers and hit by one bomb just in front of her forward funnel. She turned towards the nearby coast of Crete but was sunk by further air attacks off Cape Sideros. The bomb that sank the ship was dropped by a Ju 87 belonging to III./Sturzkampfgeschwader 2 (StG 2–Dive Bomber Wing 2). Four officers and 72 crewmen were killed, but 89 others, along with the majority of the evacuees, were rescued and taken prisoner by Italian MAS torpedo boats and the destroyer Francesco Crispi, which rounded up 229 survivors.
