= Alfred Brian Palmer =

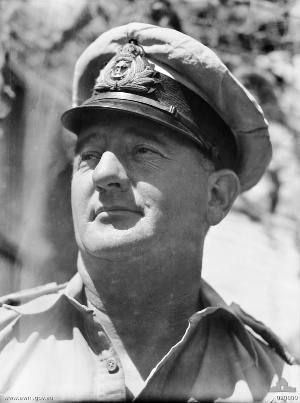
- Lieutenant Palmer in Tobruk, 11 Sept 1941
- Born: Alfred O'Brien; 27 March 1899; Redfern, New South Wales, Australia
- Died: 4 July 1993 (aged 94); Clearwater, Florida, United States
- Military career
- Allegiance: United Kingdom
- Branch: Royal Navy
- Service years: 1915 – 1918; 1939 – 1945
- Rank: Commander
- Nickname: "Pedlar Palmer"
- Conflicts: First World War Second World War
- Awards: Member of the Order of the British Empire; Distinguished Service Cross

Alfred Brian Palmer MBE, DSC (27 March 1899 – 4 July 1993) was a Royal Navy Reserve captain and near the end of his career was the commander of the shore base HMS Furneaux in Brisbane. He is known for his bravery in breaking the German blockade of Tobruk in the Second World War with his small schooner Maria Giovanni. During the Second World War he was wounded several times and finally taken prisoner by the Germans, from whom he attempted numerous escapes. He was awarded the Distinguished Service Cross in 1941 for "courage, skill and devotion to duty in operations off the Libyan coast", and made a Member of the Order of the British Empire in 1944.

== Early life ==
Palmer's name at birth was Alfred O'Brien. He first went to sea on the Daniel, a 185-ton sailing vessel built in Norway in 1830. After three voyages to New Zealand on the Daniel in November 1916, Palmer joined the Burrowa, an Australian merchant sailing vessel (2902 gross register tons). On 27 April 1917 Burrowa was attacked and sunk "sixty miles west of the Scilly Isles" by a German submarine. The crew spent two nights in a lifeboat. They were sighted by a patrol plane, picked up and taken to Penzance. Palmer then served in the British navy until the end of the First World War.

Between the First and Second World Wars, Palmer was a merchant seaman serving on many Commonwealth Line ships. He was a crew member of the Carawa when it was run aground in the Galápagos Islands. The crew members returned to Sydney on the steamers Australrange and Australmont in July 1920. In 1928, as the depression began, the Commonwealth line was sold and crews were retrenched.

He commanded a company of the Chinese Lancers in Shanghai and was a member of the volunteer reserve. On the outbreak of the Second World War he rejoined the Royal Navy, and first served as executive officer of HMS Medway (F25).

== Maria Giovanni ==
The Maria Giovanni was a 200-ton schooner captured from the Italians by the British destroyer HMS Dainty on 1 January 1941. Palmer was made skipper of the Maria Giovanni in January 1941, and the ship was used to ferry supplies to the beleaguered town of Tobruk.

He "won fame through his cussedness on the Spud Run", and by his willingness to carry any cargo. The supply of Tobruk by Palmer and others was known as the "Ferry Service".

There are slight differences in accounts of how his ship was captured, with one source saying the Italians "trapped him by a ruse", and the other saying the Germans "kidded him" to make landfall in their territory. Regardless, Palmer and his crew became prisoners of war in Italy. He was well liked in the POW camps and always had a positive effect on his companions.

== CNRRA Incident ==
Palmer was accused of embezzlement while working as marine superintendent of waterways transport for the Chinese National Relief and Rehabilitation Administration in 1947. He was convicted and sentenced to one year hard labour, but the conviction was overturned on appeal.

== Later life ==
Palmer and his wife flew from Florida to Australia to attend a Rats of Tobruk reunion in 1977, where around 600 veterans marched through Sydney streets.

== Autobiography ==
- Pedlar Palmer of Tobruk (1981) Canberra, Australia: Roebuck Society. ISBN 0-909434-21-2
- The Pirate of Tobruk: a sailor's life on the Seven Seas, with Mary E. Curtis (1994), Annapolis, Maryland: United States Naval Institute. ISBN 1-55750-667-1.
