= HMAS Vendetta (D69) =

1917 V and W-class destroyer

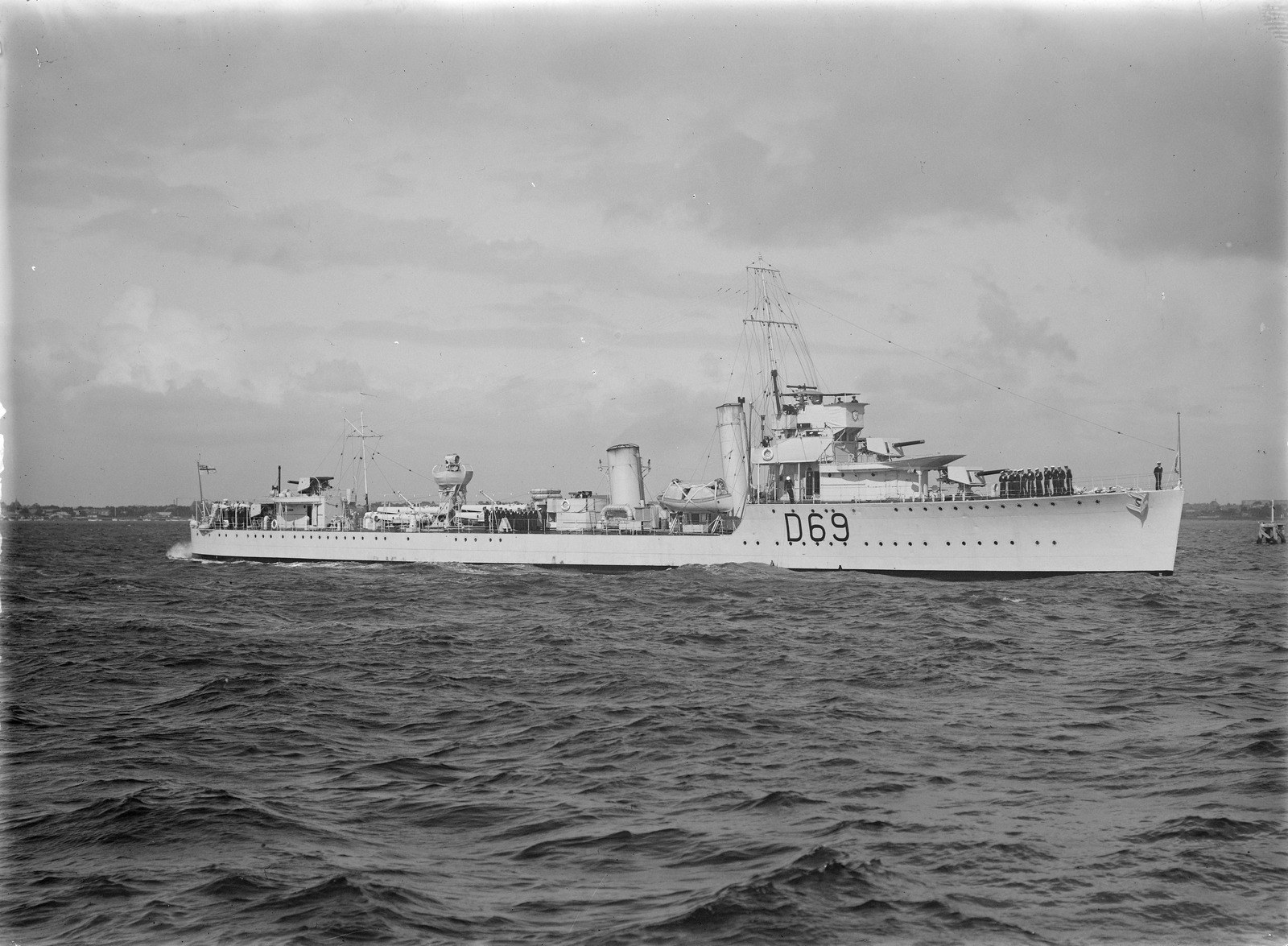
- HMAS Vendetta

History

United Kingdom
- Name: Vendetta
- Builder: Fairfield Shipbuilding & Engineering Company
- Laid down: November 1916
- Launched: 3 September 1917
- Completed: 17 October 1917
- Fate: Transferred to RAN

Australia
- Name: Vendetta
- Commissioned: 11 October 1933
- Decommissioned: 27 November 1945
- Motto: Vindico; "I Avenge"
- Honours and awards: Battle honours: Libya 1940–41; Matapan 1941; Greece 1941; Crete 1941; Mediterranean 1941; Pacific 1941–43; New Guinea 1943–44
- Fate: Scuttled off Sydney, 2 July 1948
- Badge

General characteristics
- Class & type: V-class destroyer
- Displacement: 1,090 tons standard; 1,490 tons deep load
- Length: 312 ft (95.1 m) length overall; 300 ft (91.4 m) between perpendiculars
- Beam: 29 ft 6 in (9.0 m)
- Draught: 14 ft 8 in (4.5 m) maximum
- Propulsion: 3 × Yarrow boilers, 2 × Brown-Curtis turbines, 29,417 shp (21,936 kW), 2 shafts
- Speed: Over 35 knots (65 km/h; 40 mph)
- Complement: 6 officers and 113 sailors
- Armament: As built: 4 × single QF 4-inch (102-mm) Mk V guns; 1 × 2-pounder (40-mm) pom-pom; 5 × .303-inch machine guns; 2 × triple 21-inch (533-mm) torpedo tube sets; Added later: 2 × depth charge chutes; 4 × depth charge throwers; Post-1942 conversion: 2 × 4-inch guns; 2 × pom-poms; 4 × 20 mm Oerlikon guns; 7 × .303-inch guns; depth charge chutes and throwers

HMAS Vendetta (D69/I69) (formerly HMS Vendetta (FA3/F29/D69)) was a V-class destroyer that served in the Royal Navy and the Royal Australian Navy (RAN). One of 25 V class ships ordered for the Royal Navy during World War I, Vendetta entered service in 1917.

During World War I, Vendetta participated in the Second Battle of Heligoland Bight, and operated against Bolshevik forces during the British Baltic Campaign. Most of the ship's post-war career was spent operating in the Mediterranean. In 1933, Vendetta was one of five destroyers selected for transfer to the RAN. Over the next six years, the ship was either involved in peacetime activities or was in reserve, but when World War II started, she was assigned to the Mediterranean as part of the 'Scrap Iron Flotilla'. During the Greek Campaign, Vendetta was involved in the transportation of Allied troops to Greece, then the evacuation to Crete. After, the destroyer served with the Tobruk Ferry Service, and made the highest number of runs to the besieged city of Tobruk.

At the end of 1941, Vendetta was docked for refit in Singapore, but after the Japanese invaded, the destroyer had to be towed to Fremantle, then Melbourne. After the refit, which converted the destroyer into a dedicated escort vessel, ended in December 1942, Vendetta spent the rest of World War II operating as a troop and convoy escort around Australia and New Guinea. Vendetta was decommissioned in late 1945, and was scuttled off Sydney Heads in 1948.

== Design and construction ==
Vendetta was one of 25 V-class destroyers built for the Royal Navy during World War I. She had a standard load displacement of 1,090 tons, and a deep displacement of 1,490 tons. The destroyer was 312 feet 0.75 inches (95.1167 m) in length overall and 300 feet (91 m) long between perpendiculars, had a beam of 29 feet 5.75 inches (8.9853 m), and a maximum draught of 14 feet 7.5 inches (4.458 m). Propulsion machinery consisted of three Yarrow boilers connected to two Brown-Curtis turbines, which supplied 29,417 shaft horsepower (21,936 kW) to two propeller shafts. Although designed with a maximum speed of 34 knots (63 km/h; 39 mph), Vendetta achieved 35.041 knots (64.896 km/h; 40.324 mph) during power trials. The ship's company consisted of 6 officers and 113 sailors.

On completion, the ship's main armament consisted of four single QF 4 inch Mk V naval guns. This was supplemented by a quad-barrelled 2-pounder pom-pom, five .303-inch machine guns, and two triple 21-inch torpedo tube sets. Two chutes and four throwers for depth charges were installed later in the ship's career, with a payload of 50 charges carried. When Vendetta was converted into an escort vessel in 1942, her armament was changed to two 4-inch guns, two pom-poms, four 20 mm Oerlikon guns, seven .303-inch guns, and the depth charge equipment.

Vendetta was laid down by the Fairfield Shipbuilding and Engineering Company, Limited, at Govan, Scotland on 25 November 1916. The ship was launched on 3 September 1917. Vendetta was completed on 17 October 1917, and commissioned that day into the Royal Navy. The ship's name came from the concept of vendetta. The original ship's badge depicted a stiletto dagger pointing down at an angle, however, at a point after entering RAN service, the design was modified to include an arm, with the hand around the stiletto's hilt. The ship also acquired the motto "Vindico", Latin for "I Avenge".

== Operational history ==
=== Royal Navy ===
After commissioning, Vendetta was assigned to the 13th Destroyer Flotilla. During early November 1917, the destroyer fired on German minesweepers operating in the Kattegat. On 17 November, Vendetta was involved in the Second Battle of Heligoland Bight. On 5 December, the destroyer rescued 430 survivors from HMS Cassandra after the cruiser hit a mine and sank. In early 1918, Vendetta was assigned to operate against Bolshevik forces in the Baltic; running the destroyer Spartak aground and assisting in the capture of the destroyer Lennuk in separate engagements.

After the end of World War I, Vendetta was initially used to tow captured German ships from Scapa Flow for ship breaking. In 1919, the ship served on the Irish patrol from May to August. During 1923, she operated in the Baltic with the Estonian Navy, then was assigned to the Mediterranean from 1924 until 1933. During 1924, the destroyer served as a patrol ship under the command of Lieutenant-Commander W.N.T. Beckett, protecting British interests during the Jeddah War. In March 1925, Vendetta, still under Beckett's command, escorted the royal yacht Victoria and Albert during a royal tour of the Mediterranean.

=== Transfer to RAN ===
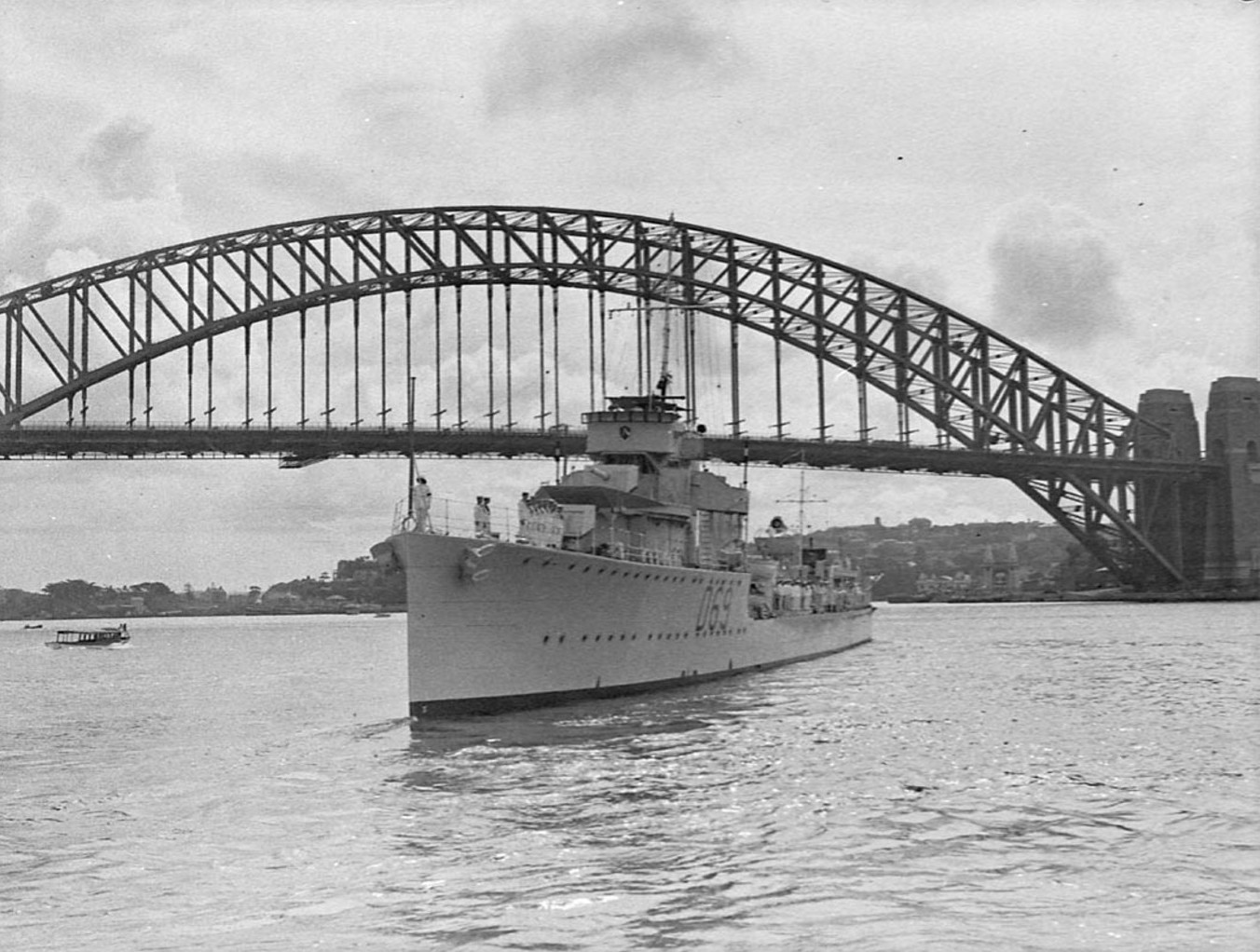
Vendetta in Sydney Harbour in April 1939 to collect the body of Prime Minister Joseph Lyons.

In 1933, the British Admiralty decided to replace five S-class destroyers on loan to the RAN with five more capable (but slightly older) destroyers. Vendetta was one of the five ships selected, and was commissioned into the RAN at Portsmouth on 11 October 1933. The ships arrived in Australia at the end of 1933, and Vendetta was placed in reserve on 31 January 1934. She was reactivated on 10 October, and performed routine peacetime duties until 1 June 1938, when she was returned to reserve. On 29 September 1938, with the threat of a new war looming Vendetta was recommissioned. In April 1939, she was given the honour of transporting the body of Prime Minister Joseph Lyons from Sydney to his final resting place in Devonport, Tasmania.

=== World War II ===
Following the outbreak of World War II, Vendetta and the other four RAN destroyers were deployed to the Mediterranean in October 1939, where they quickly acquired the nickname 'Scrap Iron Flotilla' from German propagandists. In May 1940, the destroyer docked at Malta for repairs. On 18 August, Vendetta participated in the bombardment of Bardia. From 11 October to 9 November, she was docked at Malta with engine problems. On 3 January 1941, Vendetta was involved in a second bombardment of the Libyan city of Bardia, and following its capture by the Allies, was reassigned to patrols of the Libyan coast.

During March, the ship was involved in Operation Lustre, the transportation of Allied troops and materiel to reinforce Greece. On 27 March, Vendetta was involved in the Battle of Cape Matapan, where Italian warships attempted to disrupt the Allied troop movements. Vendetta played little part in the battle as engine problems forced the destroyer to first withdraw from the destroyer force to the main battle fleet, then retreat to Alexandria for repairs. The ship returned to duty on 21 April, but the change of Allied fortune in the Greek Campaign forced the withdrawal of most of the troops landed during Lustre, and Vendetta became involved in Operation Demon, the evacuation from Greece to Crete, over the course of April. During May, the destroyer served with the Allied battle fleet of Crete attempting to deny German air superiority during the battle of and evacuation from Crete.

From the end of May to the start of August, Vendetta's division was assigned to the Tobruk Ferry Service: supply runs to the Allied forces besieged at Tobruk. During the evening of 10–11 July, Vendetta and the destroyer HMS Defender were returning from a run to Tobruk when the British destroyer was crippled by aerial bomber attacks. Vendetta took on board the soldiers and equipment Defender was carrying, and attempted to tow the ship to Alexandria. On the morning of 11 July, it was decided that salvaging the ship was unachievable, and after taking the remaining skeleton crew aboard, Vendetta torpedoed Defender at 11:15. Vendetta performed twenty return voyages to Tobruk: the greatest number by a ship assigned to the supply run. On 20 October, the destroyer concluded service in the Mediterranean, and sailed to Singapore for refit.

After the Japanese commenced air attacks on Singapore on 8 December, Vendetta's anti-aircraft weapons were removed and used to supplement the dockyard's defences. On 2 February 1942, the stripped-down vessel was towed from the dockyard by the tug St Just, then over the course of the month was towed by HMS Stronghold, HMAS Yarra, then HMAS Ping Wo to Fremantle, where she arrived on 3 March. After this, the destroyer had to be towed across the Great Australian Bight to Williamstown Naval Dockyard. Ping Wo started the tow, but only made it to Cape Leeuwin before her engines failed, and a British Phosphate Commission freighter took over, with the corvette HMAS Whyalla escorting. Three towlines were snapped by the weather conditions, and progress at some points was as low as 1.5 knots (2.8 km/h; 1.7 mph), but the ships arrived in Melbourne on 15 April. After most of the refit was completed at Williamstown, Vendetta sailed on 29 September for Sydney, where work was completed in December.

During the year-long refit, Vendetta had been modified into a dedicated escort vessel, with a reduced main armament and increased anti-aircraft capability. The period between 1943 and 1945 saw the ship involved in convoy escort and transportation duties in Australian and New Guinea waters. The destroyer's wartime service was recognised with seven battle honours: "Libya 1940–41", "Matapan 1941", "Greece 1941", "Crete 1941", "Mediterranean 1941", "Pacific 1941–43", and "New Guinea 1943–44".

== Decommissioning and fate ==
Vendetta arrived in Sydney on 3 October 1945, and was paid off for disposal on 27 November. On 20 March 1946, she was sold to Penguins Propriety Limited for scrapping. After the ship was stripped of all useful material, her hulk was scuttled off Sydney Heads on 2 July 1948.
