= HMAS Stuart (D00) =

Scott-class flotilla leader

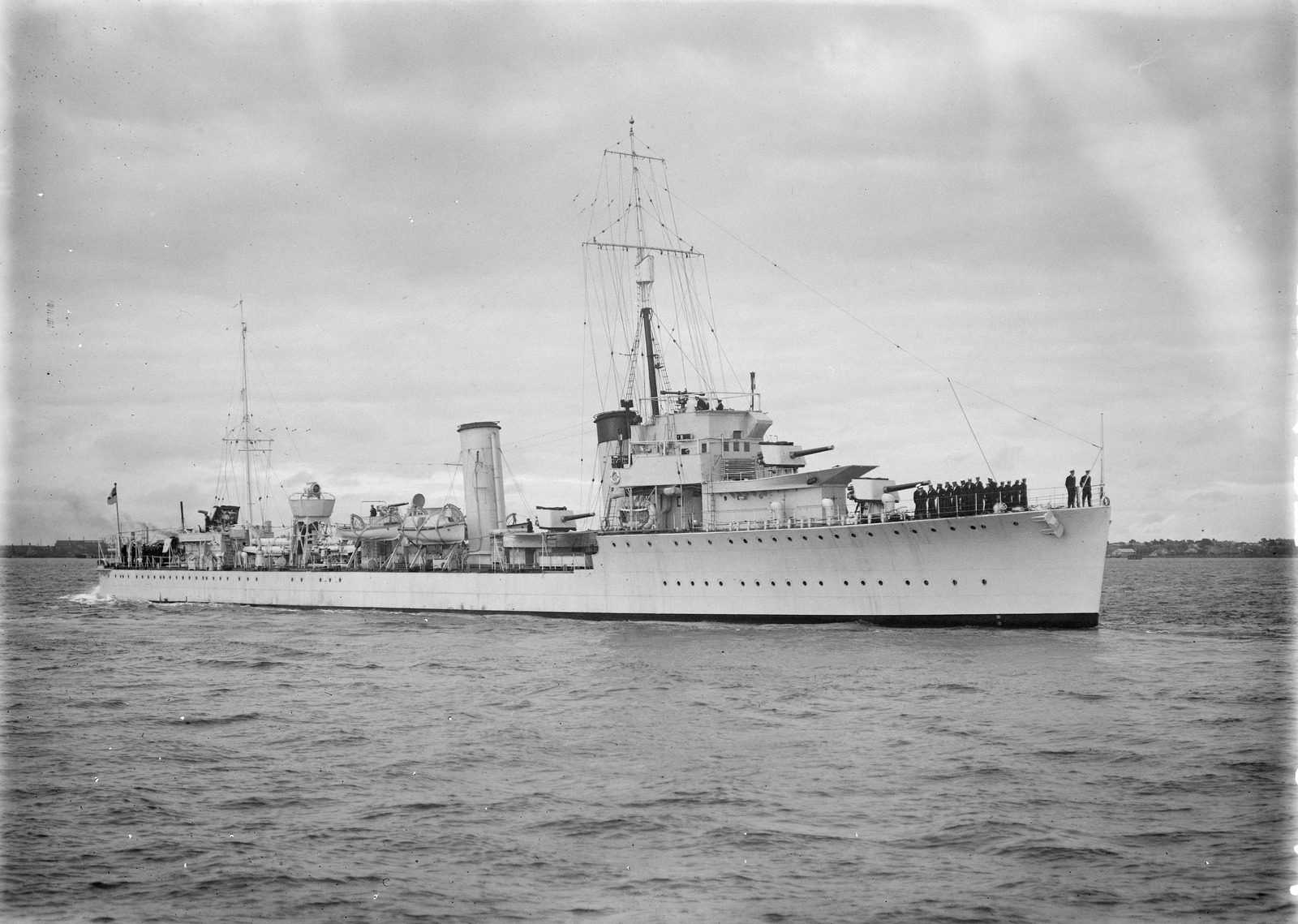
- HMAS Stuart

History

United Kingdom
- Namesake: House of Stuart
- Builder: Hawthorn Leslie and Company
- Laid down: 18 October 1917
- Launched: 22 August 1918
- Commissioned: 21 December 1918
- Decommissioned: May 1933
- Motto: "By Honour Flourish"
- Fate: Transferred to RAN

Australia
- Commissioned: 11 October 1933
- Decommissioned: 27 April 1946
- Honours and awards: Battle honours: Mediterranean 1940; Calabria 1940; Libya 1940–41; Matapan 1941; Greece 1941; Crete 1941; Pacific 1942–43; New Guinea 1942–44
- Fate: Sold for scrap
- Badge

General characteristics
- Class & type: Admiralty-type (or Scott-class) destroyer leader
- Displacement: 1,530 tons standard; 2,053 tons full load
- Length: 332 ft 7.5 in (101.384 m) length overall; 320 ft (98 m) between perpendiculars
- Beam: 31 ft 9.375 in (9.68693 m)
- Draught: 11 ft 4 in (3.45 m) at full load
- Propulsion: 4 × Yarrow boilers, 2 × Brown-Curtis turbines, 43,000 shp (32,000 kW), 2 shafts
- Speed: 34 knots (63 km/h; 39 mph) as designed
- Range: 3,000 nautical miles (5,600 km; 3,500 mi) at 10 knots (19 km/h; 12 mph)
- Complement: 183 officers and sailors in 1918; 11 officers and 156 sailors in 1936
- Armament: In 1933: 5 × BL 4.7-inch (120 mm) guns; 1 × QF 3-inch (76 mm) AA gun; 2 × QF 2-pounder (40 mm) AA guns (pom-poms); 5 × .303 inch machine guns; 6 × 21-inch (533 mm) torpedo tubes (two triple mountings); 2 × depth charge throwers; 4 × depth charge chutes; See "Design and construction" section for changes during World War II

HMAS Stuart (formerly HMS Stuart) was a British Scott-class flotilla leader. The ship was built by Hawthorn Leslie and Company for the Royal Navy during World War I, and entered service at the end of 1918. The majority of the destroyer's British service was performed in the Mediterranean, and in 1933 she was transferred to the Royal Australian Navy. Although placed in reserve in 1938, Stuart was reactivated at the start of World War II to lead the Australian destroyer force, nicknamed the "Scrap Iron Flotilla" by German propagandists.

The flotilla operated in the Mediterranean, with Stuart participating in the Western Desert Campaign and the battles of Calabria and Cape Matapan, defeating the Italian submarine Gondar, evacuating Allied troops from Greece and Crete, and serving with the Tobruk Ferry Service. The destroyer returned to Australia for repairs and refit in late 1941, and spent most of 1942 and 1943 in Australian waters. Stuart was modified into a stores and troop transport in early 1944, and operated in this role around Australia and New Guinea until early 1946. Stuart was placed in reserve in 1946, and was sold for ship breaking in early 1947.

== Design and construction ==
Stuart was one of nine Admiralty-type (or Scott-class) flotilla leaders constructed during World War I for the Royal Navy. The ship had a displacement of 1,530 tons standard and 2,053 tons at full load. She was 332 feet 7 1/2 inches (101.38 m) long overall and 320 feet (98 m) long between perpendiculars, with a beam of 31 feet 9 3/8 inches (9.69 m), and a draught of 11 feet 4 inches (3.45 m) at full load. The propulsion machinery consisted of four Yarrow boilers feeding two Brown-Curtis turbines, which delivered 43,000 shaft horsepower (32,000 kW) to the two propeller shafts. Although designed with a maximum speed of 34 knots (63 km/h; 39 mph), Stuart could reach 34.669 knots (64.207 km/h; 39.896 mph) on the measured mile during trials. Maximum range was 3,000 nautical miles (5,600 km; 3,500 mi) at 10 knots (19 km/h; 12 mph). The ship's company initially consisted of 183 personnel, but by 1936 had decreased to 167: 11 officers and 156 sailors.

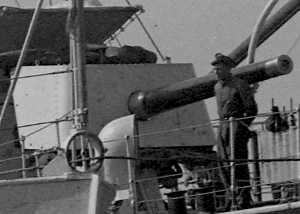
Stuart's 4.7-inch "A" gun mounting

As originally designed, the ship's main armament consisted of five BL 4.7 inch /45 naval guns, which were augmented by a 3-inch gun for anti-aircraft defence. When Stuart entered RAN service in 1933, the ship's armament consisted of five BL 4.7 inch /45 naval guns, a QF 3-inch 20 cwt anti-aircraft gun, two QF 2-pounder naval guns (known as pom-poms), five .303 inch machine guns (a mix of Lewis and Maxim guns), six 21-inch torpedo tubes (in two triple mountings), two depth charge chutes, and four depth charge throwers. By 1941, two of the 4.7-inch guns had been removed, five 20 mm Oerlikon anti-aircraft guns and a Breda gun had been fitted, and the depth charge chutes were replaced with depth charge rails. A year later, a third 4.7-inch gun was removed, along with two of the Oerlikons, the .303-inch guns, the Breda gun, and the torpedo tube sets. During 1942, a Hedgehog anti-submarine mortar was installed. When Stuart was converted into a storesship and troop transport in 1944, her armament was changed to a single 4-inch gun, seven Oerlikons, three quad-barelled pom-poms, a Hedgehog, and a payload of depth charges.

Stuart was laid down by Hawthorn Leslie and Company at their shipyard in Newcastle-upon-Tyne on 18 October 1917, and was launched on 22 August 1918. Stuart was one of only four ships in her class to launch before the end of World War I. The destroyer was completed on 21 December 1918 and commissioned into the Royal Navy on the same day. The ship's name comes from the royal House of Stuart, and the badge design depicts a Stuart royal crown and a Yorkshire rose: the Scottish Stuarts' claim to the English throne came from their descent from Edward IV of the House of York.

== Operational history ==
=== Royal Navy ===
After being commissioned in December 1918, Stuart spent most of her Royal Navy career operating with British forces in the Mediterranean, during which time she was mainly assigned to the 2nd Destroyer Flotilla, operating out of various locations including Malta. In the immediate post war period, amidst the disintegration of the Ottoman Empire and civil war in Russia, Stuart was heavily involved in various operations. In 1919–20, Stuart saw service in the Black Sea as part of Royal Navy operations during the Allied intervention in the Russian Civil War, being dispatched to Yalta in April 1919 as fighting broke out in the Crimea, and later evacuating troops from the British military mission in March 1920 as Bolshevik forces advanced on Novorossiysk. She also provided assistance to the Greeks during operations against the Turks, reinforcing the Aegean Squadron and escorting troopships during the occupation of Smyrna in May 1919, and the during the landing at Panderma in July 1920. In early 1921, Stuart was operating out of Constantinople, where the Allied forces had established an occupation force at the end of the war.

Royal Navy operations in the Mediterranean normalised after 1923, and in the latter part of the decade Stuart undertook various exercises and other routine duties as part of the Mediterranean Fleet. Between 1928 and 1931, the ship was commanded by William Whitworth. In May 1933, the ship was decommissioned. Stuart, along with four V and W-class destroyers, were transferred to the RAN as a replacement for the Australians' previous complement of destroyers: Stuart was to replace the destroyer leader HMAS Anzac. Stuart commissioned into the RAN on 11 October 1933. The five ships sailed from Chatham on 17 October, and arrived in Sydney on 21 December.

=== Royal Australian Navy ===
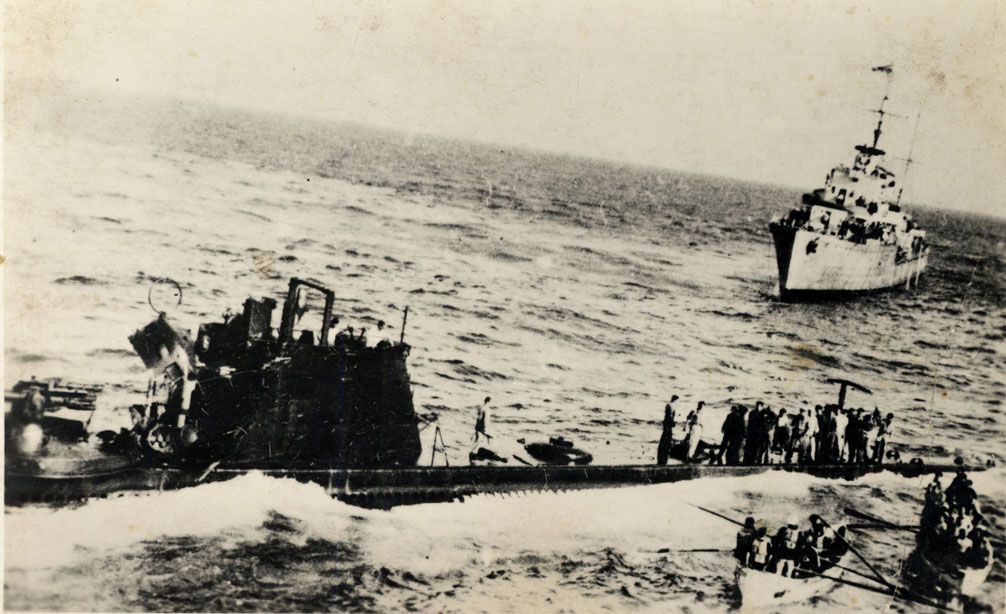
Gondar evacuating as HMAS Stuart lays off

Stuart spent the early part of her RAN career operating in Australian waters, and she was decommissioned into reserve on 1 June 1938. The destroyer was briefly reactivated from 29 September to 30 November 1938. She recommissioned again on 1 September 1939 under Commander Hector Waller, RAN. On 14 October, Stuart led the RAN destroyer flotilla from Sydney; the ships reached Malta on 2 January, and were redesignated the 19th Destroyer Division, nicknamed the "Scrap Iron Flotilla" by German propagandists. On 27 May, they were merged with the 20th Division to form the 10th Destroyer Flotilla. In July 1940, Stuart led the 10th Flotilla during the Battle of Calabria. Stuart was also involved in the Western Desert Campaign, providing gunfire support to army forces. On 30 September 1940, the destroyer attacked the Tobruk-bound Italian submarine Gondar, forcing her crew to surrender. Stuart supported the 6th Australian Division when it captured Tobruk on 22 January 1941, and participated in the Battle of Cape Matapan in March 1941. During the battle, Stuart hit the Italian cruiser Zara with a torpedo.

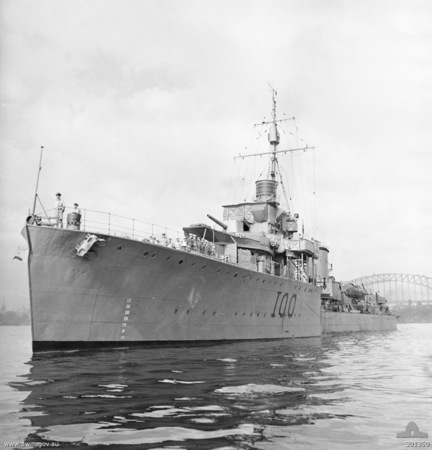
Stuart on Sydney Harbour in 1944, following her conversion

She then assisted in the evacuation of Allied troops from Greece in April 1941 and the evacuation from Crete in May 1941. During June and July 1941, Stuart participated in the Tobruk Ferry Service: supply runs to the Australian forces besieged at Tobruk. The destroyer made 24 runs before she was forced to sail back to Australia with a disabled port engine. Sailing on 22 August, the ship arrived in Melbourne on 27 September, and was docked for repairs and refits until April 1942. After the refit, the destroyer was employed on convoy escort runs and anti-submarine patrols in eastern Australian waters. At the end of 1943, the destroyer was removed from service, and during early 1944, was converted into a storesship and troop transport. After conversion, Stuart operated in Australian and New Guinea waters until January 1946.

The ship earned eight battle honours for her wartime service: "Mediterranean 1940", "Calabria 1940", "Libya 1940–41", "Matapan 1941", "Greece 1941", "Crete 1941", "Pacific 1942–43", and "New Guinea 1942–44".

== Decommissioning and fate ==
Stuart was decommissioned into reserve on 27 April 1946. The destroyer was sold to T. Carr and Company on 3 February 1947 for ship breaking, and was delivered to the breakers yard on 21 February. After scrapping, the keel was buried in Kissing Point Bay, Putney, New South Wales.
