= The Rats of Tobruk =

Allied division in the World War 2 Africa campaign

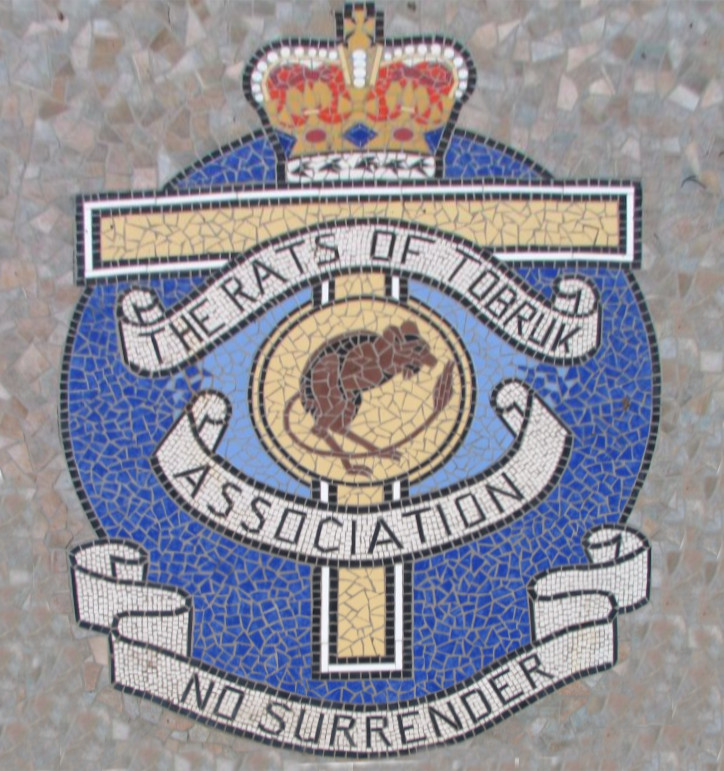
Mosaic at the foot of the Rats of Tobruk Memorial, Queen's Park, Mackay, Queensland, Australia, bearing the Rats of Tobruk Association insignia.

The Rats of Tobruk were soldiers of the Australian-led Allied garrison, as well as the Polish Independent Carpathian Rifle Brigade that held the Libyan port of Tobruk against the Afrika Corps, during the Siege of Tobruk in World War II. The siege started on 11 April 1941 and was relieved on 10 December. The port continued to be held by the Allies until its surrender on 21 June 1942.

Between April and August 1941, some 35,000 allies, including around 14,000 Australian soldiers, were besieged in Tobruk by a German–Italian army commanded by General Erwin Rommel. The garrison, commanded by Lieutenant General Leslie Morshead, included the 9th Australian Division (20th, 24th, and 26th Brigades), the 18th Brigade of the 7th Australian Division, four regiments of British artillery, and the 3rd Indian Motor Brigade. Between August and October, most of the original garrison was replaced by British, Polish and Czechoslovak troops.

The last official ROT member, an Australian ex-soldier, died in August 2024, at the age of 102.

== Origins of the name ==
The defenders had adopted Tobruk's excellent network of below-ground defensive positions which had been built pre-war by the Italian Army. The propagandist for Germany, William Joyce, better known as "Lord Haw-Haw", began describing the besieged men as living like rats in underground dug-outs and caves. In radio broadcasts, he derisively referred to and addressed the garrison as the "rats of Tobruk". Likewise, the ageing warships that supplied and evacuated Tobruk were denigrated by German propaganda as "scrap iron". The ships became known affectionately to the garrison as the "Scrap Iron Flotilla" and the "Tobruk ferry service".

Australians reclaimed the name as a badge of pride, even going so far as to strike their own unofficial medal bearing the likeness of a rat. This was done by corporal Leslie Harold Dufton (QX1193) over several nights using the metal from a German bomber that the Rats had shot down with captured German guns. Throughout the conflict, the enemy attack had at least twice the manpower and the advantage of strong air support, while the Tobruk garrison had little air support because of remoteness from friendly airbases. This made the supply of the garrison, necessarily by sea, very difficult with ships having to arrive, unload and depart under the cover of darkness.

== Operational roles ==
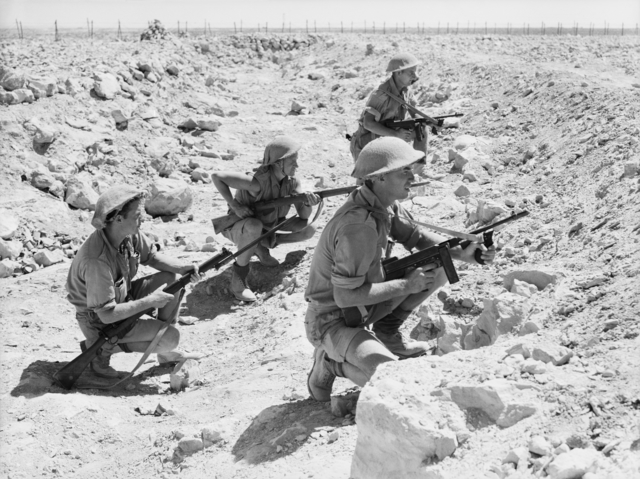
A patrol from the 2/13th Infantry Battalion at Tobruk

At this time, Rommel's Afrika Korps had never been defeated. During the first phase of the offensive, the Rats were mostly concerned with constructing and reinforcing their defences and observing the enemy. After a few months, however, purely defensive operations gave way to patrols. These forays outside friendly lines were broken into two categories: reconnaissance and fighting.

Apart from providing information on the enemy, sometimes these reconnaissance patrols entailed the capture and/or field interrogation of an enemy. Later, almost exclusively at night, a fighting patrol would act on viable targets found, operating under the simplest of guidelines: do as much damage as you can without getting caught.

== Withdrawal of Australians ==
On 28 April, the soldiers were told to expect reinforcement and resupply within eight weeks. In the summer of 1941, Lieutenant-General Thomas Blamey, commander of the Second Australian Imperial Force, with the support of the Prime Minister of Australia, requested the withdrawal of 9th Australian Division from Tobruk in order to meet the strong desire of the Australians that all their forces in the Middle East should fight under one command. General Claude Auchinleck, who had replaced Wavell as C-in-C Middle East Command in Cairo, agreed in principle, but was not anxious to expedite the operation because a troop movement of this size would have to be made by fast warships during moonless periods of the month (because of the risk of air attacks to shipping) at a time when every resource needed to be concentrated on the planned Operation Crusader.

Based on reports from Australian H.Q. Middle East that the health of the troops had been suffering, the new Australian prime minister, Arthur Fadden, and his successor John Curtin rejected requests from Winston Churchill to change their minds and the replacement of the division was effected by the Royal Navy between August and October. During 9th Australian Division's stay in the besieged Tobruk, some 3,000 Australians had become casualties and 941 taken prisoner.

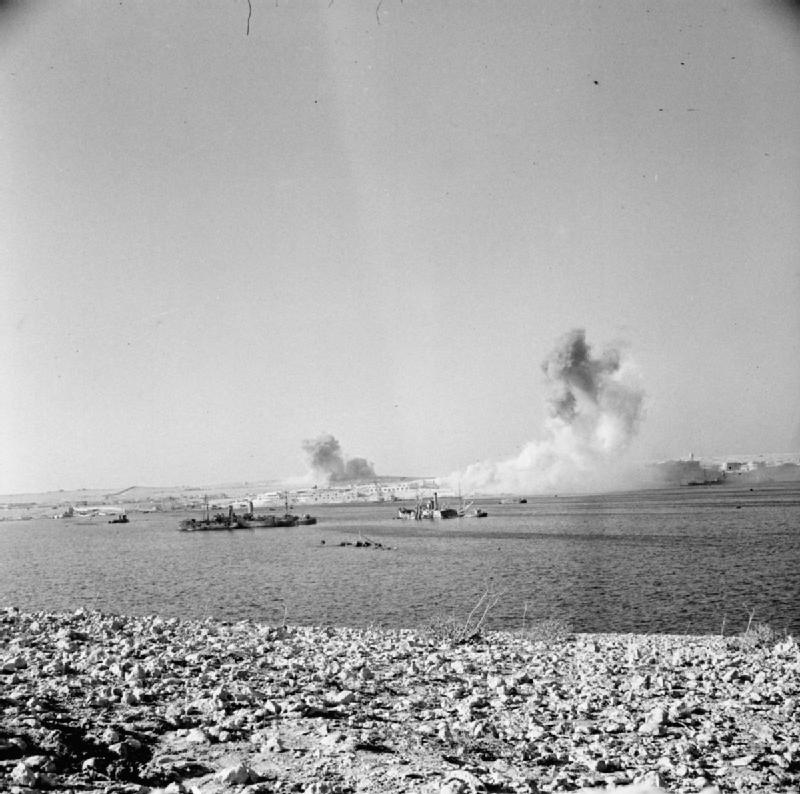
German bombs explode during one of the heaviest air raids on Tobruk. The photograph was taken from a trench adjoining an AA gun.

The Australians were gradually withdrawn during the three moonless periods between August and October. In August, 18 Australian Infantry Brigade and the Indian Army's 18th King Edward's Own Cavalry were replaced by the Polish Carpathian Brigade – which had the Czechoslovak 11th Infantry Battalion (East) under command – and, in September and October, the British 70th Infantry Division, including the 32nd Army Tank Brigade, replaced the rest of the Australians. Morshead was succeeded as commander of the Tobruk fortress by 70th Division's commander, Major-General Ronald Scobie.

== Royal Artillery ==
The Royal Artillery units at Tobruk were spearheaded by the anti-tank 25-pounders of the 1st Regiment Royal Horse Artillery. The 4th Anti-Aircraft Brigade also played an important role in the defence of the garrison, which was under incessant air attack, particularly by Stuka dive-bombers. Some of its units were relieved as the siege wore on, but 153rd (London) and 235th (Kent) Heavy Anti-Aircraft Batteries (of 51st (London) Heavy Anti-Aircraft Regiment, Royal Artillery, and 89th HAA Regiment, RA, respectively), regimental HQ and 40 and 57 Light AA Batteries of 13th Light AA Regiment, RA, and 39 LAA Battery of 13th Light AA Regiment saw the whole siege through. The Siege of Tobruk was finally relieved on 10 December 1941 in the later stages of Operation Crusader.

== Modern commemoration ==
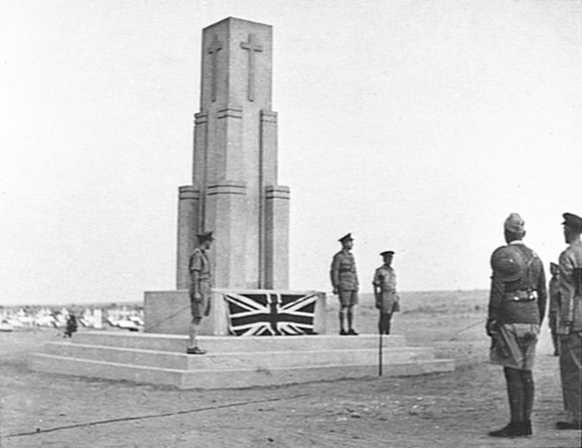
Major General Leslie James Morshead unveiling a Memorial to the heroes of Tobruk at Tobruk War Cemetery, circa January 1942

The Rats of Tobruk hold an identifiable place within the ranks of returned servicemen, particularly in Australia, where there is the Rats of Tobruk Memorial in Canberra.

On 22 March 1944, the original members of the Rats of Tobruk formed the North Bondi Sub-Branch of the Returned and Services League of Australia and it is still known in modern times as Tobruk House or The Rathouse. In 2003, The New York Times ran an article on The Rathouse calling it "an ideal beachside hang out."

Their overarching international association, The Rats of Tobruk Association, is partly responsible for the erection of numerous monuments in Australia and the UK and involvement with official memorial services. The association also organised with the Royal Mint of Australia the striking of a 50-year anniversary medallion in 1991.

The association's insignia shows the elements of a large uppercase letter 'T', for Tobruk, a long-tailed desert rat, and a crown. The crown depicted is variously the Tudor Crown or St Edward's Crown (since 1953), representing allegiance to the Australian Sovereign, or a crown mimicking Tobruk's official pre-war city flag which was liberated from the city's hall during the siege.

In April 2007, the Victorian contingent of the Rats of Tobruk Association concluded that it could no longer afford the upkeep of Tobruk House, the inner-city Melbourne meeting hall that had been purchased by the Association in the 1950s. Back then, the Victorian Association had 1,800 members. By 2007, there were just 80 left, all aged in their 80s and 90s, who decided to sell the hall. From the sale, they hoped to raise up to A$1.5 million to be used for research at Royal Children's Hospital, Melbourne, where a neuroscience ward, the Rats of Tobruk Ward, had already been named after them. Bill Gibbins, owner of a trucking company, bid beyond the expected price to outbid a Sydney developer for A$1.73 million. As reported by The Age, "in an act that stunned the old diggers, Mr Gibbons [sic]... then told the veterans they could keep the hall as long as they wanted."

The first memorial was built in the Tobruk War Cemetery, Tobruk, Libya, built circa January 1942, subsequently replaced, but later destroyed.

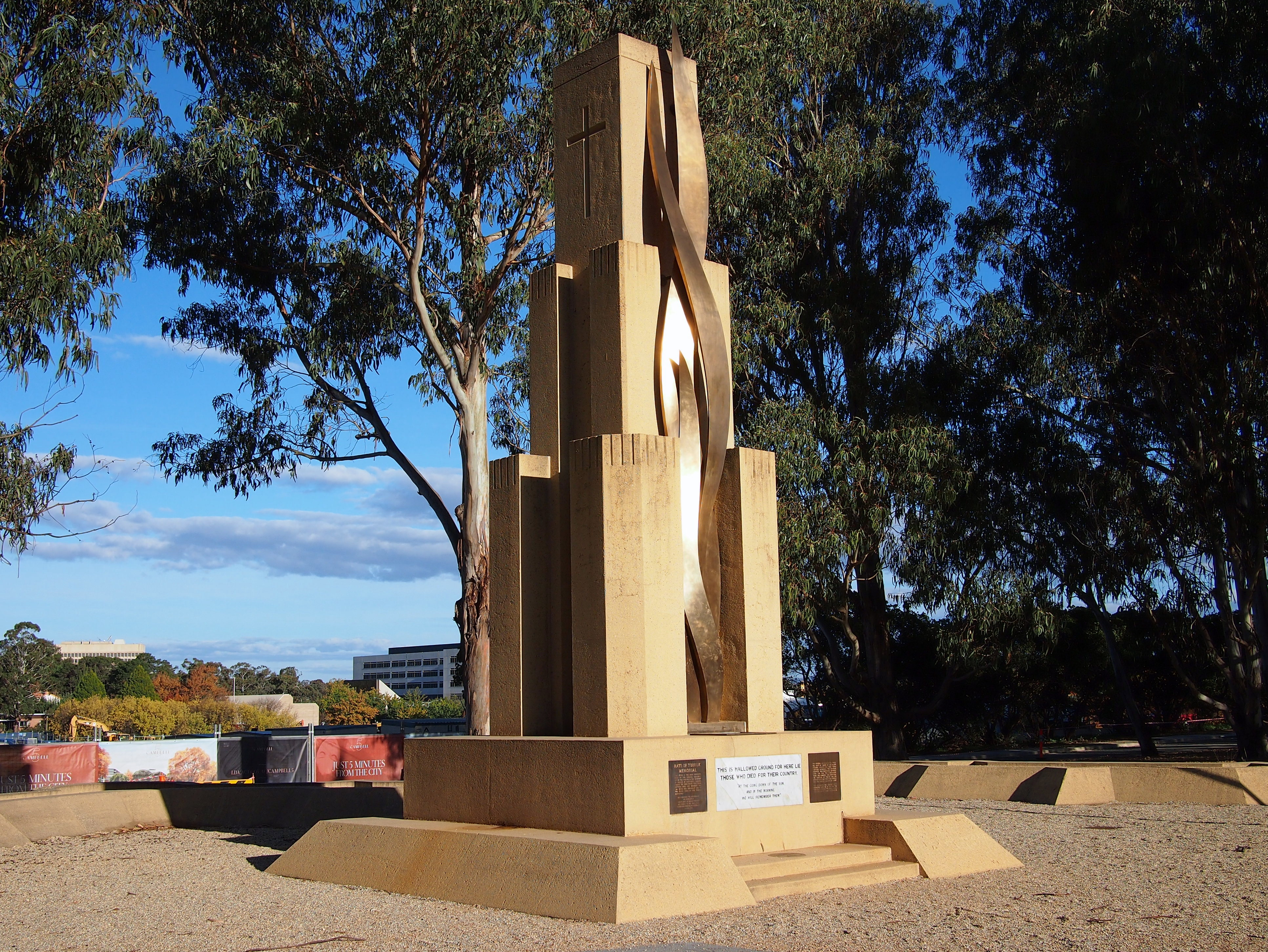
Rats of Tobruk Memorial, Canberra, 2014

In Australia, there are a number of memorials, some of which are built as replicas of the memorial in the Tobruk War Cemetery. The replicas include:

- Rats of Tobruk Memorial, Canberra, which incorporates the plaque of the memorial of the memorial in Tobruk War Cemetery, with an eternal flame element added later
- Brisbane Rats of Tobruk Memorial in the Roma Street Parklands, Brisbane
- Memorial at Ithaca Creek State School, Bardon, Brisbane
- Beenleigh St Joseph's School Tobruk Memorial 70 Tobruk Street, Beenleigh, City of Logan
- Bundaberg Rats of Tobruk Memorial in Rats of Tobruk Memorial Park, corner Takalvan Street (Isis Highway) and Steffensen Street, Bundaberg
- Rockhampton Rats of Tobruk Memorial in Jeffries Park, Albert Street and Alma Street, Rockhampton
- Mackay Rats of Tobruk Memorial in Queens Park, Goldsmith Street, Mackay
- The Southport School replica memorial adjacent to Saint Alban's Chapel

Other non-replica memorials to the Rats of Tobruk include:

- Rats of Tobruk Memorial in the Shrine of Remembrance in ANZAC Square, Brisbane
- Toowoomba Rats Of Tobruk Memorial in East Creek Park, Margaret Street and Burstow Street, Toowoomba
- There is a Rats of Tobruk Reserve in Albert Park, a suburb of Melbourne, Victoria.

== In popular culture ==
- Charles Chauvel directed a 1944 movie titled The Rats of Tobruk, starring Peter Finch and Chips Rafferty.
- In 2019 Strategy and Tactics Press released a war game in the magazine World at War Issue #64 covering the campaign April–May 1941.
- The 2021 video game Call of Duty: Vanguard depicts the Rats of Tobruk with one of its playable characters, Australian Lucas Riggs, being a member of the Tobruk garrison in August 1941.

== See also ==
- Desert Rats
- The Rat Patrol, TV show
