= HMAS Waterhen (D22) =

W-class destroyer of the British Royal Navy and Royal Australian Navy

Coordinates: 32°15′N 25°20′E

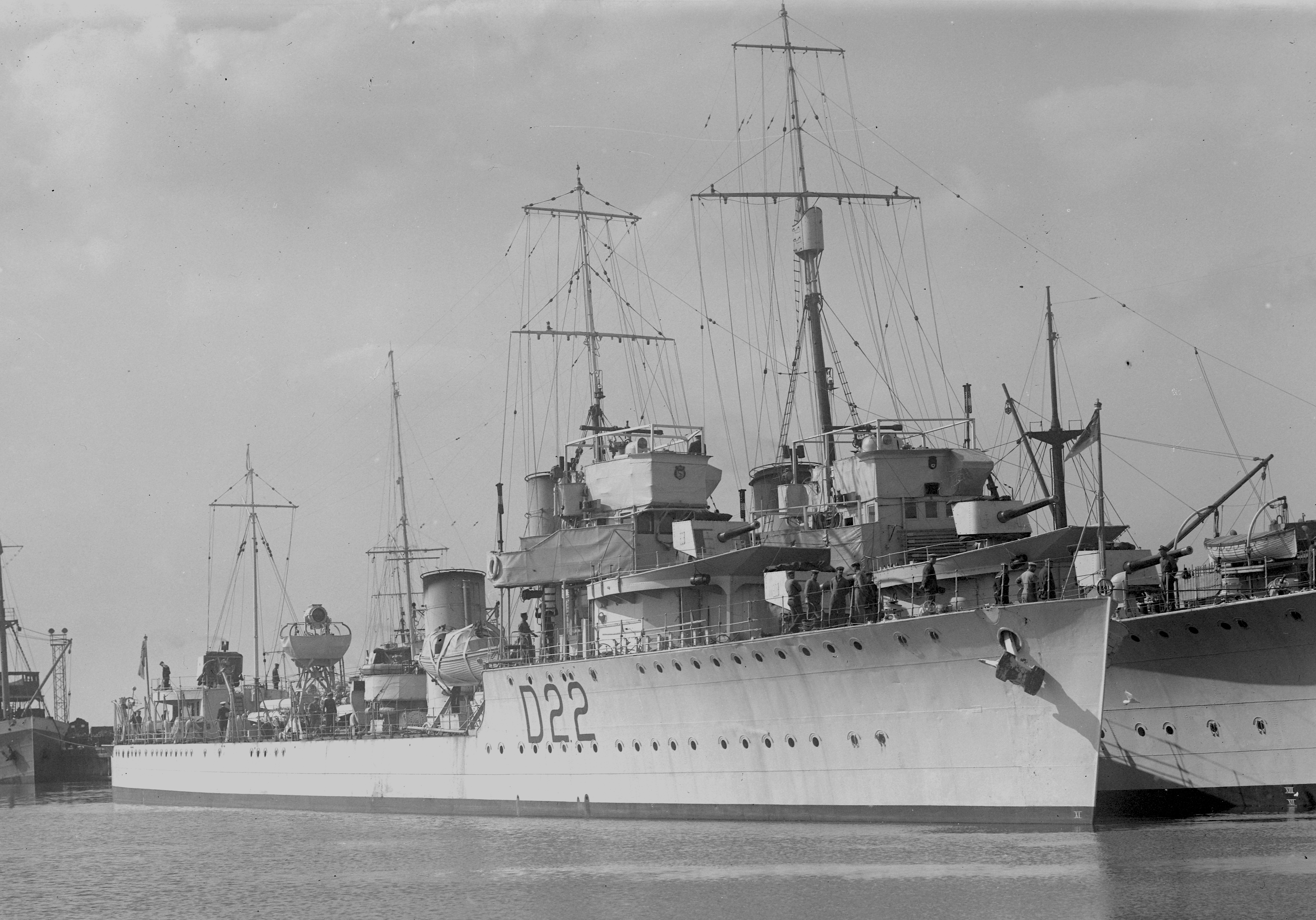
- HMAS Waterhen, with HMAS Stuart in background

History

United Kingdom
- Name: Waterhen
- Namesake: Waterhen
- Builder: Palmers Shipbuilding and Iron Company
- Laid down: 3 July 1917
- Launched: 26 March 1918
- Completed: 17 July 1918
- Commissioned: July 1918
- Decommissioned: October 1933
- Fate: Transferred to Royal Australian Navy

Australia
- Name: Waterhen
- Commissioned: 11 October 1933
- Decommissioned: 9 October 1934
- Recommissioned: 14 April 1936
- Decommissioned: 1 June 1938
- Recommissioned: 1 September 1939
- Nickname(s): The Chook
- Honours and awards: Battle honours: Libya 1940–41; Greece 1941; Crete 1941
- Fate: Sunk by dive bombers, 30 June 1941

General characteristics
- Class & type: W-class destroyer
- Displacement: 1,100 tons standard
- Length: 312 ft (95.1 m) length overall; 300 ft (91.4 m) between perpendiculars
- Beam: 29 ft 6 in (9.0 m)
- Draught: 13 ft 11 in (4.2 m)
- Propulsion: 3 × White=Forster boilers, 2 × Brown-Curtis turbines, 27,000 shp (20,000 kW), two shafts
- Speed: 34 knots (63 km/h; 39 mph)
- Range: 3,560 nautical miles (6,590 km; 4,100 mi) at 12 knots (22 km/h; 14 mph)
- Complement: 6 officers, 113 sailors
- Armament: 4 × QF 4-inch (102 mm) Mk V guns; 1 × QF 2-pounder (40 mm) AA gun (later increased to 2); 5 × .303-inch (7.7 mm) machine guns; 2 × 3-tube 21-inch (533 mm) torpedo sets (replaced by 2 × 4-tube sets); Depth charge chutes and throwers

HMAS Waterhen (D22/I22) was a W-class destroyer that served in the Royal Navy (as HMS Waterhen (G28/D22)) and the Royal Australian Navy (RAN). Built during World War I, the destroyer was completed in mid-1918, and commissioned into the Royal Navy. In 1933, Waterhen and four other British ships were transferred to the RAN. The ship's early RAN career was uneventful, with periods spent decommissioned in reserve, but she was reactivated in September 1939, and deployed to the Mediterranean as part of the Australian destroyer force: the Scrap Iron Flotilla. During her time in the Mediterranean, Waterhen was involved in escort and patrol duties, performed shore bombardments, and participated in Allied evacuations from Greece and Crete. On 29 June 1941, while operating with the Tobruk Ferry Service, Waterhen was heavily damaged by two Italian Regia Aeronautica's aircraft, dive bombers Ju 87 Stuka (renamed Picchiatello) of 239 squadriglia, flown by pilots Serg.mag. Ennio Tarantola and Serg. Lastrucci. Attempts to tow the ship to port were unsuccessful, and she sank on 30 June 1941, the first RAN ship lost to combat in World War II.

== Design and construction ==
Waterhen was a W-class destroyer constructed for the Royal Navy during World War I. The ship had a displacement of 1,100 tons at standard load, was 312 feet 1.25 inches (95.1294 m) in length overall and 300 feet (91 m) long between perpendiculars, had a beam of 29 feet 6.5 inches (9.004 m), and a maximum draught of 13 feet 11.125 inches (4.24498 m). Propulsion machinery consisted of three Yarrow boilers feeding two Brown-Curtis turbines, which provided 27,000 shaft horsepower (20,000 kW) to the two propeller shafts. Maximum designed speed was 34 knots (63 km/h; 39 mph). Waterhen had a range of 3,560 nautical miles (6,590 km; 4,100 mi) at 12 knots (22 km/h; 14 mph). The ship's company consisted of 6 officers and 113 sailors.

At launch, Waterhen's main armament consisted of four single QF 4-inch (102 mm) Mark V guns. This was supplemented by a quad-barelled QF 2-pounder naval gun, and five .303 inch machine guns of various types. The destroyer was also fitted with two 3-tube 21-inch (533 mm) torpedo sets, two depth charge chutes, and four depth charge throwers. Later modifications to her armament included the installation of a second 2-pounder gun, and the replacement of the torpedo tube sets with two 4-tube sets.

Waterhen was laid down by Palmers Shipbuilding and Iron Company at their shipyard in Hebburn-on-Tyne on 3 July 1917. She was launched on 26 March 1918. The destroyer was completed on 17 July 1918, and was commissioned into the Royal Navy.

== Operational history ==
=== Transfer to RAN ===
In 1933, the British Admiralty decided to replace five S-class destroyers on loan to the RAN with five more capable (but slightly older) destroyers. Waterhen was one of the five ships selected, and was commissioned into the RAN at Portsmouth on 11 October 1933. The ships arrived in Australia on 21 December 1933. Waterhen was paid off into reserve on 9 October 1934 but recommissioned on 14 April 1936. She was decommissioned again on 1 June 1938, and returned to service between 29 September and 10 November 1938.

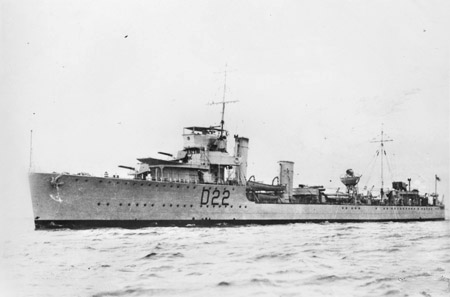
Waterhen underway

=== World War II ===
With war in Europe looming, Waterhen was recommissioned on 1 September 1939. On 14 November, Waterhen sailed to Singapore, then after rendezvousing with the rest of the Australian Destroyer Flotilla (referred to as the "Scrap Iron Flotilla" by German propagandists), headed for the Mediterranean. While en route, Waterhen detached to participate in the unsuccessful hunt for the German warship Admiral Graf Spee. During the early part of her Mediterranean deployment, Waterhen was involved in convoy escort and anti-submarine patrols, but these were mostly uneventful until Italy entered the war in August 1940.

On 17 August, the destroyer performed shore bombardments of the Libyan coast. On 21 August, they did the same at Bardia. In October, Waterhen escorted supply ships to Crete, where a forward base was being set up to assist in the Allied reinforcement of Greece. On 25 December, the ship captured the Italian sailing vessel Tireremo Diritto. On 30 December, Waterhen accidentally rammed and sank the anti-submarine trawler HMS Bandalero, and was forced to dock for repairs. In April, Waterhen became involved in Allied evacuations from Greece and Crete. After this, she was assigned to the Tobruk Ferry Service; supply runs to the Allied force besieged at Tobruk.

== Loss ==
On 29 June, Waterhen and HMS Defender were making the run to Tobruk when they were attacked off Sollum by 19 Axis Junkers Ju 87 dive bombers (twelve German and seven Italian). The attack heavily damaged the Australian destroyer (although the only casualty was a wound from a flying can of bully beef); Waterhen was hit in the stern by a single 500 kg (1,100 lb) bomb dropped by the Ju 87 piloted by Maresciallo Ennio Tarantola (239th Dive Bombing Squadron, Regia Aeronautica), which caused the immediate flooding of the engine and boiler rooms. Defender took Waterhen in tow, but at 13:50 on 30 June 1941, the destroyer rolled over and sank. She was the first ship of the Royal Australian Navy to be lost by enemy action in World War II.

The ship earned three battle honours for her wartime service: "Libya 1941", "Greece 1941", and "Crete 1941".
