= Ithaca Creek State School =

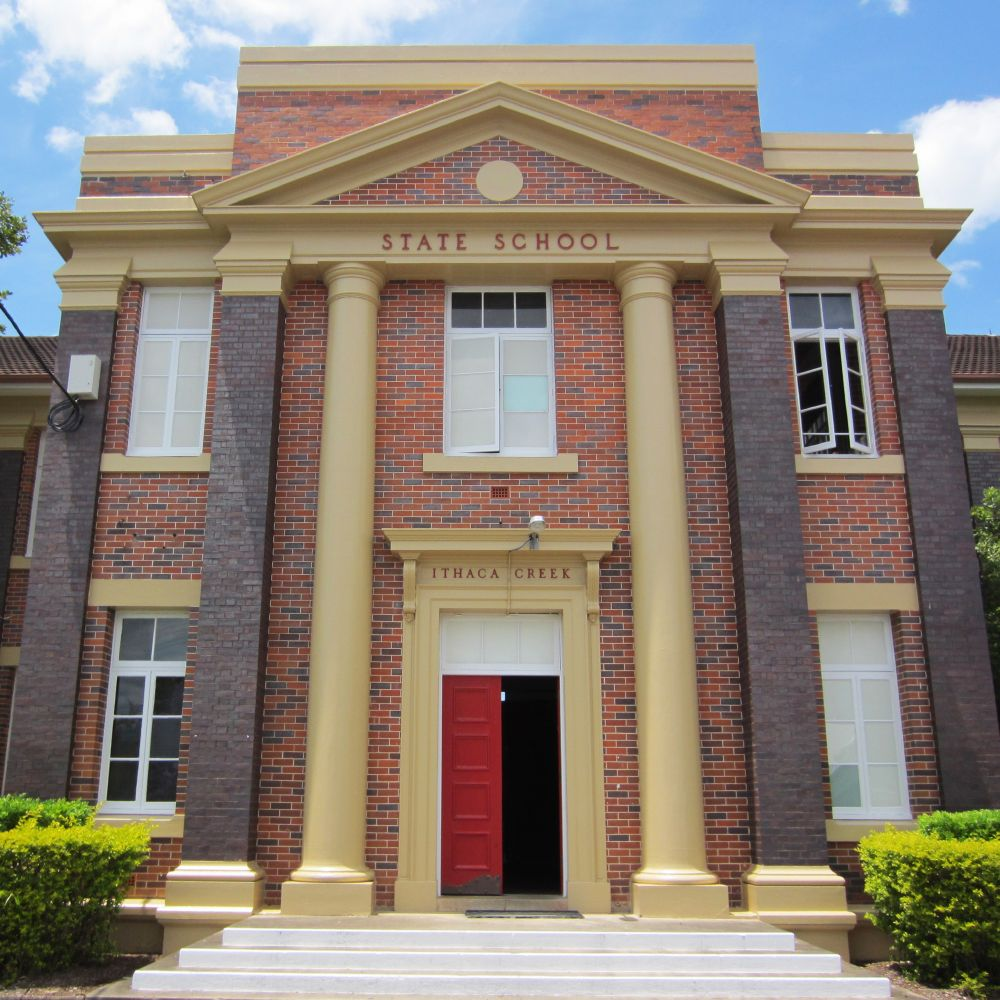
- Front entrance, 2015

- Location within Queensland
- 27.4521°S 152.9923°E
- Location: 49 Lugg Street, Bardon, City of Brisbane, Queensland, Australia

History
- Design period: 1919–1930s (Interwar period)
- Built: 1930–1939, 1932, 1934–1936, 1934–1936, 1939, 1946, 1946, 1947, 1954

Site notes
- Architect(s): Queensland Department of Public Works (Andrew Baxter Leven, Nigel Laman Thomas, and Harold James Parr)
- Architectural style: Classicism

Queensland Heritage Register
- Official name: Ithaca Creek State School
- Type: state heritage
- Designated: 5 February 2016
- Reference no.: 650022
- Type: Education, research, scientific facility: School-state
- Theme: Educating Queenslanders: Providing primary schooling

Ithaca Creek State School is a heritage-listed state school and war memorial at 49 Lugg Street, Bardon, City of Brisbane, Queensland, Australia. It was designed by Queensland Department of Public Work (involving Andrew Baxter Leven, Nigel Laman Thomas, and Harold James Parr) and built from 1930 to 1939. It was added to the Queensland Heritage Register on 5 February 2016.

== History ==
Ithaca Creek State School (established 1885), located in the inner Brisbane suburb of Bardon about four kilometres northwest of the Brisbane central business district (CBD), is important in demonstrating the evolution of state education and its associated architecture. It retains a Depression-era brick school building (1934–1936), constructed as a Depression-era work project, which is an aesthetically pleasing landmark in the streetscape; and landscaped grounds including retaining walls (c. 1936 and pre-1960), a parade ground (1934–1936), tennis court (1939) with tennis shed (pre-1946), a playing field (1932), a World War II (WWII) memorial dedicated to The Rats of Tobruk, and mature trees. The school has a strong and ongoing association with its surrounding community.

The provision of state-administered education was important to the colonial governments of Australia. National schools, established in 1848 in New South Wales were continued in Queensland following the colony's creation in 1859. Following the introduction of the Education Act 1860, which established the Board of General Education and began standardising curriculum, training and facilities, Queensland's national and public schools grew from four in 1860 to 230 by 1875. The State Education Act 1875 provided for free, compulsory and secular primary education and established the Department of Public Instruction. This further standardised the provision of education, and despite difficulties, achieved the remarkable feat of bringing basic literacy to most Queensland children by 1900.

The establishment of schools was considered an essential step in the development of early communities and integral to their success. Locals often donated land and labour for a school's construction and the school community contributed to maintenance and development. Schools became a community focus, a symbol of progress, and a source of pride, with enduring connections formed with past pupils, parents, and teachers. The inclusion of war memorials and community halls reinforced these connections and provided a venue for a wide range of community events in schools across Queensland.

To help ensure consistency and economy, the Queensland Government developed standard plans for its school buildings. From the 1860s until the 1960s, Queensland school buildings were predominantly timber-framed, an easy and cost-effective approach that also enabled the government to provide facilities in remote areas. Standard designs were continually refined in response to changing needs and educational philosophy and Queensland school buildings were particularly innovative in climate control, lighting, and ventilation. Standardisation produced distinctly similar schools across Queensland with complexes of typical components.

Land in the vicinity of Ithaca Creek State School was first surveyed in the 1860s, but not auctioned as suburban lots until 1870. In 1880, an early local government area was created incorporating the land between Enoggera and Windsor; it was called Ithaca Division after the Ithaca Creek which flows through it. By 1884 a country postal receiving office operated at Ithaca Creek to serve the small community.

In the same year, the community petitioned the Minister for Public Lands to reserve land for a school at Ithaca Creek and soon afterwards a one hectare site (Portion 826B) was reserved for this purpose.

Ithaca Creek State School opened on a sloping site fronting Lugg Street (now in the suburb of Bardon with the City of Brisbane), on 28 September 1885, with a timber school building to accommodate 60 pupils. By December of that year 103 boys and 85 girls were enrolled with, on average, 66 boys and 55 girls attending.

The district continued to grow and in 1887 Ithaca Shire was formed from Ithaca Division. It comprised about one tenth of the former division (11.5 km^{2}), included Paddington, Bardon and Red Hill, and had a population of about 10,000 residents.

Further growth in the area took place, resulting in the creation of the Town of Ithaca, which replaced the shire in 1903. This development was promoted by the establishment of Brisbane's electric tram network after 1897, which extended from Roma Street to Enoggera Terrace, via Musgrave Road while a second route travelled along Caxton Street and Given Terrace. In 1925 the municipality of Ithaca was incorporated into Greater Brisbane.

Ithaca Creek State School grew in synchrony with this development, but its grounds needed work. In 1926 a school committee formed to improve the school grounds to meet modern ideas and provide better equipment for sporting activities. It created a scheme for extension and improvement of the school grounds, which at the time were under 2.5 acres (1.0 ha) and extremely rough, resulting in the children playing on the roadway in front of the school. The scheme embraced the extension of the school grounds, and the provision of septic tanks, swimming pool, gymnasium, library, tennis court, and basketball courts. The first step was the filling in of a gully in the grounds.

Over the next six years, the committee provided over £550 and the Government provided approximately £410 for purchase of land. As a result, the grounds trebled in size to create a total area of approximately 7.75 acres (3.14 ha) with purchase of land to the south and southeast of the school reserve creating access from Grace Street and Primrose Terrace. This expansion was achieved despite the onset of worldwide economic depression.

The Great Depression, commencing in 1929 and extending well into the 1930s, caused a dramatic reduction of building work in Queensland and brought private building work to a standstill. In response, the Queensland Government provided relief work for unemployed Queenslanders and also embarked on an ambitious and important building programme using day labour and Queensland materials, to provide impetus to the economy.

Even before the October 1929 stock market crash, the Queensland Government initiated an Unemployment Relief Scheme, through a work programme by the Department of Public Works. This included painting and repairs to school buildings. By mid-1930 men were undertaking grounds improvement works to schools under the scheme.

Extensive funding was given for improvements to school grounds, including fencing and levelling ground for play areas, involving terracing and retaining walls. This work created many large school ovals, which prior to this period were mostly cleared of trees but not landscaped. These play areas became a standard inclusion within Queensland state schools and a characteristic element. In mid-1932 unemployed men working under the government's relief scheme were employed at Ithaca Creek State School levelling its newly purchased grounds. The Hon Richard Hill, Member of the Queensland Legislative Assembly, told a gathering of parents in June 1932 that Department of Public Works' "expenditure on improvements to the school and its grounds, and expenditure under the intermittent relief scheme had totalled £2121, from 1929 to 1932. In addition, £800 had been approved for relief work at the school, and £126 for the purchase of additional land, making a total of £3047 for three years, or an average of £1000 a year".

In June 1932 the Forgan Smith Labor Government came to power from a campaign that advocated increased government spending to counter the effects of the Depression. The government embarked on a large public works building programme designed to promote the employment of local skilled workers, the purchase of local building materials and the production of commodious, low maintenance buildings which would be a long-term asset to the state. This building programme included: government offices, schools and colleges; university buildings; court houses and police stations; hospitals and asylums; and gaols.

Many of the programmes have had lasting beneficial effects for the citizens of Queensland, including the construction of masonry brick school buildings across the state. Most were designed in a classical idiom as this projects the sense of stability and optimism which the government sought to convey through the architecture of its public buildings.

Ithaca Creek State School was one of the approximately 30 schools chosen for the addition of a brick school building to replace its earlier timber building. The construction of substantial brick school buildings (E/B1) in prosperous or growing suburban areas and regional centres during the 1930s provided tangible proof of the government's commitment to remedy the unemployment situation. The Department of Public Works and Department of Public Instruction were extremely enthusiastic about these Depression-era brick school buildings. They were considered monuments to progress embodying the most modern principles of the ideal education environment.

Depression-era brick school buildings form a recognisable and important type, exhibiting many common characteristics. Frequently, they were two storeys above an open undercroft and built to accommodate up to 1000 students. They adopted a symmetrical plan form and often exhibited a prominent central entry. The plan arrangement was similar to that of timber buildings being only one classroom deep, accessed by a long straight verandah or corridor. Due to their long plan forms of multiple wings, they could be built in stages if necessary; resulting in some complete designs never being realised. Ideally, the classrooms would face south with the verandah on the north but little concession was made for this and almost all Depression-era brick school buildings faced the primary boundary road, regardless of orientation. Classrooms were commonly divided by folding timber partitions and the undercroft was used as covered play space, storage, ablutions and other functions.

Despite their similarities, each Depression-era brick school building was individually designed by a DPW architect, which resulted in a wide range of styles and ornamental features being utilised within the overall set. These styles, which were based on contemporary tastes and fashions, included: Arts and Crafts, typified by half-timbered gable-ends; Spanish Mission, with round-arched openings and decorative parapets; and Neo-classical, with pilasters, columns and large triangular pediments. Over time, variations occurred in building size, aesthetic treatment, and climatic-responsive features. The Chief Architect during this period was Andrew Baxter Leven (1885–1966), who was employed by the Queensland Government Works Department from 1910 to 1951, and was Chief Architect and Quantity Surveyor from 1933 to 1951. Other DPW architects involved in the design of Ithaca Creek State School were Nigel Laman Thomas and Harold James Parr.

In 1934, stage one of Ithaca Creek State School's brick school building commenced with construction of the north, lateral wing, of the planned U-shaped building comprising a range and two wings, located on the original school reserve. Construction was carried out by the Inspectorial and Construction Branch of the DPW. The Department of Public Works Annual Report to 30 June 1934 reported the building as follows:

Ithaca Creek SS, Brisbane: Erection. Estimated Cost, £9,388 (In progress) This building, which is the first section of a scheme to accommodate 1,000 pupils, is constructed of brick with concrete foundation and fibrolite slate roof. The portion of building which is now under construction is of two storeys with basement under. Each floor provides for four classrooms of (40) pupils, giving a total accommodation for 320 pupils, also for cloakroom, and connecting 8ft 6in corridors and concrete staircase. The basement floor [undercroft] comprises lavatory recommendation for girls for the whole school and has play area, fitted with seats and drinking taps. A sewerage system will be installed.

The foundation stone was laid by the Minister for Public Instruction, Frank Cooper, on 19 May 1934. The first section was occupied in October 1934 and the next two stages constructed in 1934–1935 (range) and 1935–1936 (southern wing); both works supervised by the Inspectorial and Construction Branch of the DPW. Concrete retaining walls to the north, south and east were built by the DPW in conjunction with this work.

A photograph dated 30 June 1935 shows the Depression-era brick school building, with the first two stages - the northern wing and range - completed, and a prominent roof fleche projecting from the centre of the range. Housing the main entrance to the building, a symmetrical, two-storeyed entrance bay projected west from the range, and featured a stepped parapet, and a pediment supported by large columns and pilasters. Pilasters on the elevation had simple, rendered capitals. Casement windows were located between pilasters in the western elevation of the range and in the entry bay, and had awning fanlights.

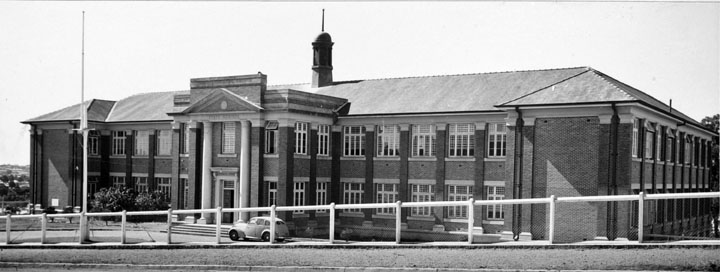
Block A, 1946

With all three stages completed, the Depression-era brick school building (now called Block A) was officially opened on 21 March 1936 by the Minister for Public Instruction (Frank Cooper) who commented that:

the building was part of an undertaking to supply the best possible facilities for education, which were so necessary if Queensland was to keep pace with the rest of the quickly progressing world.... The cost of the building to date is £28,663. It has three wings, providing room for more than 1000 children. Some 800 to 900 pupils are on the present roll. The school is installed with all modern conveniences, broad corridors, spacious, airy, and well lighted classrooms and offices and a septic tank system.

A bell was installed in the roof fleche after June 1936.

Improvements to the school grounds continued after completion of Block A. The Ithaca Creek State School Committee in March 1936 was raising money for improvement of the sports oval and the laying down of two tennis courts, two basketball courts and other improvements to the 7.5 acres (3.0 ha) of school grounds. In March 1938 The Courier-Mail newspaper reported that the committee had spent £700 on ground improvements. The Minister for Health and Home Affairs (Ned Hanlon) opened a tennis court at Ithaca Creek State School on 3 June 1939, commending the school committee for buying adjoining land to provide a cricket and football oval for the boys; and "congratulated the relief workers who had done much to improve the school grounds". A hipped-roofed tennis shed, with an eastern opening, existed on the site by 1946 to the south of the western tennis court. A further 8879sqm of land, located to the south of the Lugg Street school reserve, was purchased c. 1950 (Lot 889 SL1899). The parade ground was sealed in 1969.

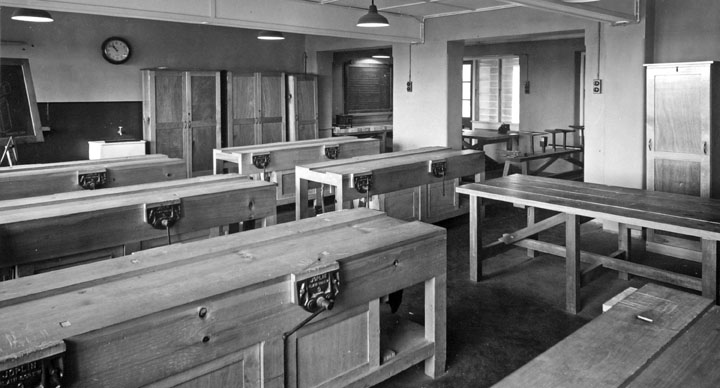
Manual training classroom, 1950

Block A underwent modifications in 1949 to convert part of the first storey for use as domestic science classrooms, a visual education room, and teachers room. A manual training room was built in the understorey and later converted into a tuckshop. In 1979 the verandahs of Block A were enclosed with aluminium windows. A metal-framed, concrete walkway was added as a connection to the southern wing of the Block A when a two-storey brick building was constructed in 2009. To facilitate this connection, an aluminium-framed door replaced a north-facing window of Block A.

Over the school's history, a number of buildings and structures have been added and removed from the site. These include: the original timber school building (1885, extended 1886, 1888, 1900, 1928, removed 1968); a teachers residence (c. 1885, removed 1915); a playshed (1889, removed pre-1946); an open-air annexe (1915, removed after 1924); a tennis shed (pre-1946); a Hawksley Building (1953, demolished c. 2008); a swimming pool to the east of Block A (1964); grandstands and night lighting for the pool complex (1971) a pre-school centre (1975); a hall (2005, enclosed 2009) with attached outside school care building (2011); a two-storey brick building with undercroft (2009); a one-storey brick teaching learning centre with undercroft (2010); and a one-storey classroom building (2013).

Ithaca Creek State School has a long history of community involvement - from social dances in the 1930s; to fundraising for the school pool from the 1930s to the 1960s, with lamington drives, "brick" cards and penny miles; to the present day's functions and events.

The school community's involvement with world events is also acknowledged. An Honour Board commemorating those who served in WWII (1939–45) hangs in the foyer of the Block A. It was donated by William Cook of Primrose Terrace in honour of his son Thomas Wesley Cook who died in the war. It was unveiled on Friday 5 September 1947 by David Gledson, the Queensland Attorney-General.

A WWII Memorial (erected after 1954), commemorating the Rats of Tobruk, who during WWII defended Tobruk in North Africa against the Axis powers between April and December 1941, stands to the northwest of the front (west) lawn of the school. Constructed as a small replica of a monument built in 1941 by the engineers of the 9th Division (Australia) in the Tobruk War Cemetery, Libya, the memorial is of a stepped, Art-Deco design and stood on a stepped plinth. Metal crosses feature at the highest tier of the memorial, with the Rats of Tobruk Association's crest above a plaque on the lowest tier.

Ithaca Creek State School has marked the anniversaries of its establishment with three school histories published conjunction with: its 75th anniversary, its centenary, and its 120th anniversary. The Ithaca Creek school community also celebrated this latter milestone by building a new hall and holding an anniversary weekend.

In 2015, the school continues to operate from its original site. It retains the Department of Public Works Depression-era brick school building set in landscaped grounds with tennis (multipurpose) courts and tennis shed, playing field and mature shade trees. The school is important to the area, having been a focus for the community, and generations of students have been taught there. Since establishment, Ithaca Creek State School has been a key social focus for its community with the grounds and buildings having been the location of many social events.

== Description ==
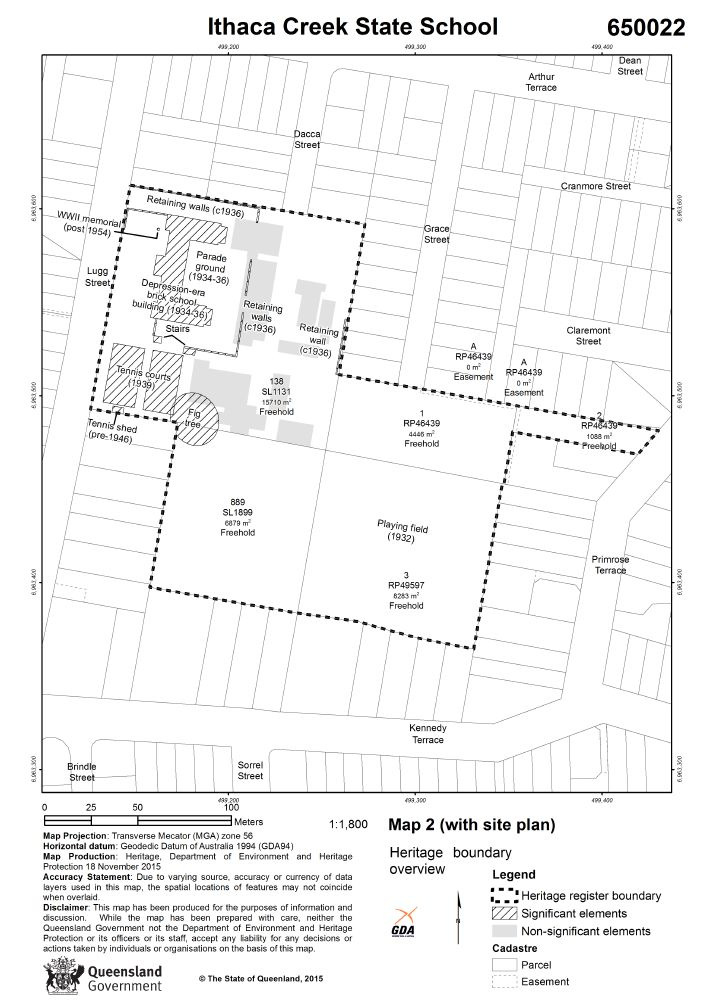
Site map, 2015

Ithaca Creek State School occupies a large site within the hilly terrain of Bardon, a residential suburb northwest of Brisbane CBD. Facing Lugg Street to the west, the sloping site is bounded to the north, south and east by residential properties. The school is accessed from Lugg Street, with additional entrances via Dacca and Grace Streets (north) and Primrose Terrace (east). The school comprises a complex of buildings and structures, the largest of which is a Depression-era brick school building (Block A; 1934–36), located in the northwestern corner of the site, addressing Lugg Street. Other important elements within the school grounds include various retaining walls (c. 1930s and pre-1960), a parade ground to the east of Block A, two tennis courts and a tennis shed south of the Block A, a war memorial at the northern end of the Lugg Street entry garden, a WWII Honour Board in the entry foyer of Block A, and mature trees.

=== Depression-era brick school building (Block A; 1934–36) ===
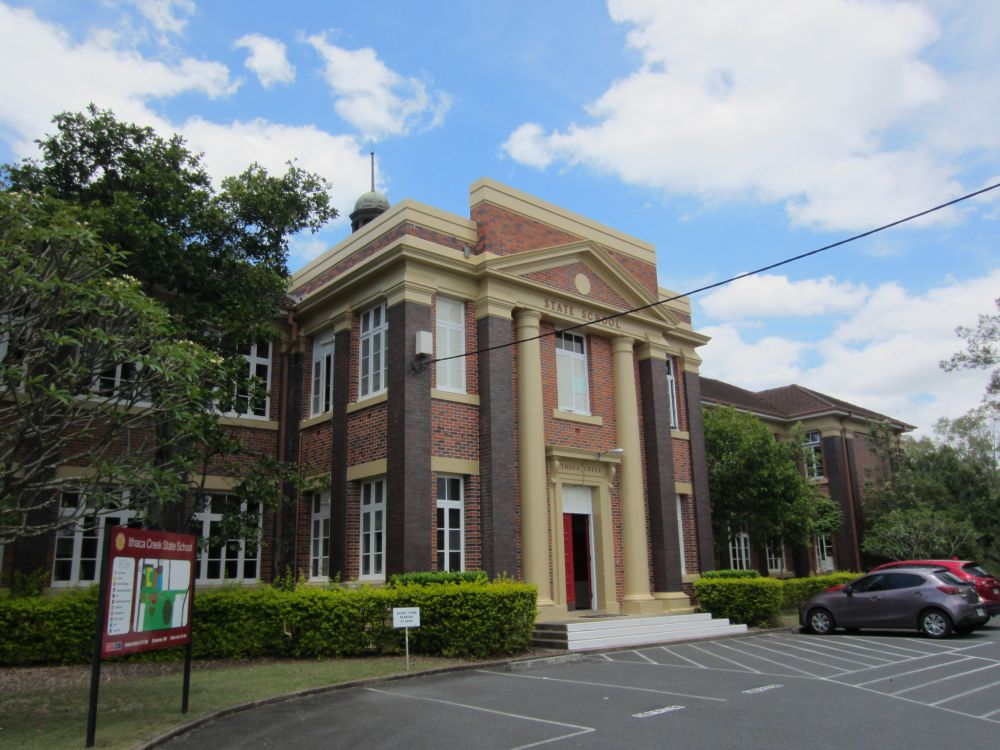
Front view, Block A, 2015

Block A is a symmetrical, masonry structure of two storeys, with an undercroft level. A tall copper fleche projects above the tiled, hipped roof and houses the school bell. The building is U-shaped in plan, arranged around an eastern parade ground, and comprises: a range (1935) running north–south; with two lateral wings, the northern (1934) and southern (1936), running perpendicular on a west–east axis. The ends of the northern and southern wings project from the front elevation.

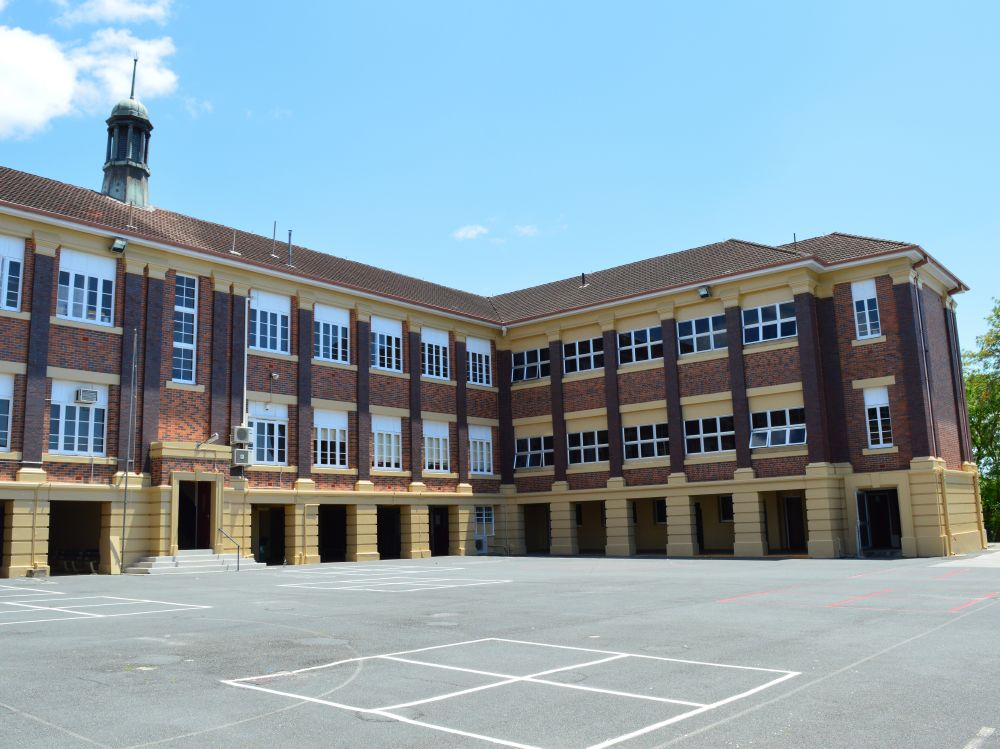
Rear view of Block A from the parade ground, 2015

The building is elegantly composed with Classical detailing. Constructed from load-bearing face brick walls, it has rendered decorative elements on the ground and first floors, and rendered walls and piers that resemble channel-jointed ashlar to the undercroft level. Red-brown face brick walls in a stretcher bond are relieved with brown face brick pilasters in an English bond. The pilasters have simple, rendered capitals. A two-storey bay, projecting from the western side of the central range, frames the main entrance. It is topped by brick parapets - with the section over the central pediment being the tallest - and a large, rendered pediment. The pediment is supported by pilasters and two tall, painted concrete columns. It features the words "STATE SCHOOL" within its entablature and a rendered circle is set on face brick within the tympanum. The centred front door is framed by rendered detailing and has "ITHACA CREEK" written on the architrave. A stone, set within the wall north of the front door, commemorates the foundation date of the building, 19 May 1934, and the name of the person who laid the stone, Hon. FA Cooper (the then Secretary for Public Instruction).

The interior layout of the building is symmetrical, with the northern and southern wings mirrored; and the ground floor layout approximately repeated on the first floor. The entrance bay comprises a ground floor foyer, centrally located between northern and southern office spaces, and two first floor offices. It is aligned with the range's central stair, which is flanked to the north and south by storage rooms and classrooms. The northern and southern wings have three large classrooms (formerly four) on the ground and first floors; terminated at the eastern end by storage rooms and enclosed stairs. The classrooms throughout the building retain bulkheads that indicate the original layout of dividing partitions. Most classrooms and offices have plaster walls, timber-framed floors covered in modern carpet, and flat sheeted ceilings with dark-stained timber battens. Skirtings are generally wide and plastered, and most rooms retain timber picture rails. Stairs are of painted concrete and have metal and timber balustrades.

Corridors, along the western side of the range, and verandahs (now enclosed), along the parade ground sides of the northern and southern wings, provide access to the classrooms and offices. They have polished concrete floors and their plaster ceilings are flat, with those on the first floor featuring dark-stained timber battens. Verandahs have face brick balustrades, and early sinks are retained at their eastern ends.

The undercroft level is accessed via the central stair and is largely open play-space. Toilets are located at the eastern ends of the northern and southern wings, a tuckshop (former woodwork-classroom) encloses the western end of the northern wing, and a storage room encloses the western end of the southern wing. The undercroft has a concrete slab floor. Timber framing is exposed in parts of the range's ceiling, and some early corrugated metal ceilings within the northern and southern wings are retained. The piers are stop-chamfered.

Early timber joinery is retained throughout the building, including: tall casement windows (to the exterior); double-hung sash windows (to the verandahs); and panelled timber doors. A set of early timber folding doors is retained in a classroom on the ground floor of the northern wing, which is rare. Most windows and doors retain their awning fanlights and early window and door hardware. Modern aluminium windows (1979) enclosing the verandahs are not of cultural heritage significance.

=== Landscape Elements ===
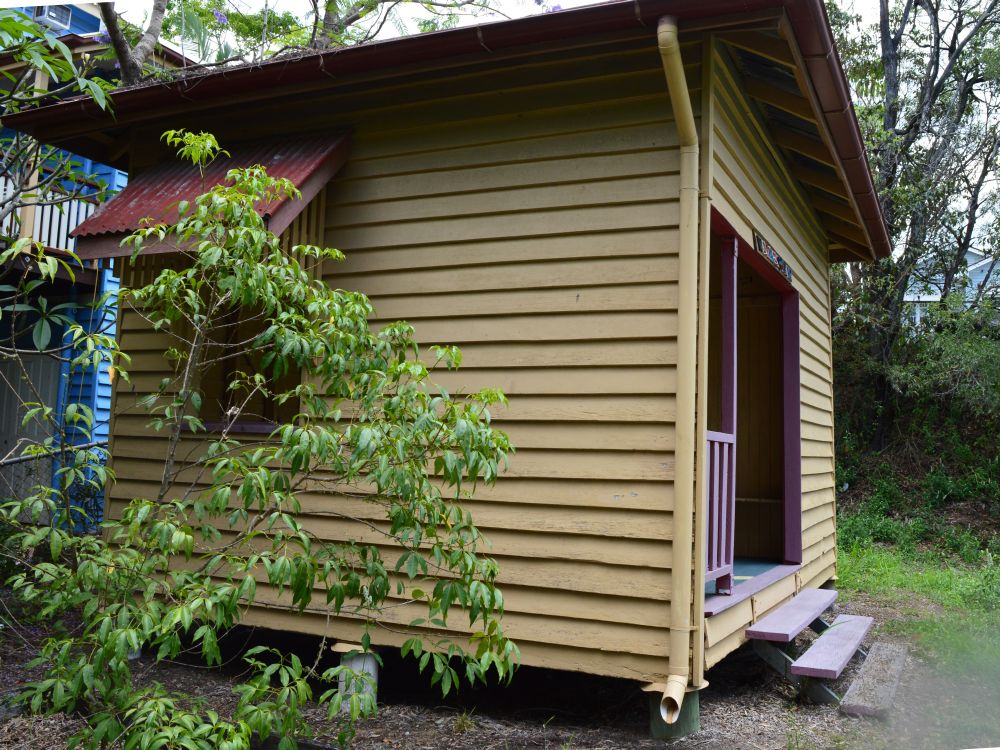
Tennis shed, 2015

The school grounds are well established, with sporting facilities including a generous playing field (1932) at the southeastern end of the site, and two levelled tennis courts (1939, one recently resurfaced as a multi-purpose court) with a timber tennis shed (pre-1946) to the south of Block A. The tennis shed is located south of the western tennis court; and is lowset, sheltered by a corrugated metal-clad hip roof, and clad with a single-skin of timber weatherboards. It comprises a western store room and an open eastern space, separated by a panelled timber door, set within a timber wall, which is lined with wide timber boards above door head-height, and v-jointed (VJ) boards below door head-height. Metal hooks are retained at the door head height, and a timber seat is built into the southern wall of the eastern space. Window openings have corrugated metal-clad hoods with timber brackets.

Many mature trees are located within the school grounds, including a large fig tree (Ficus sp.) southeast of the tennis courts.

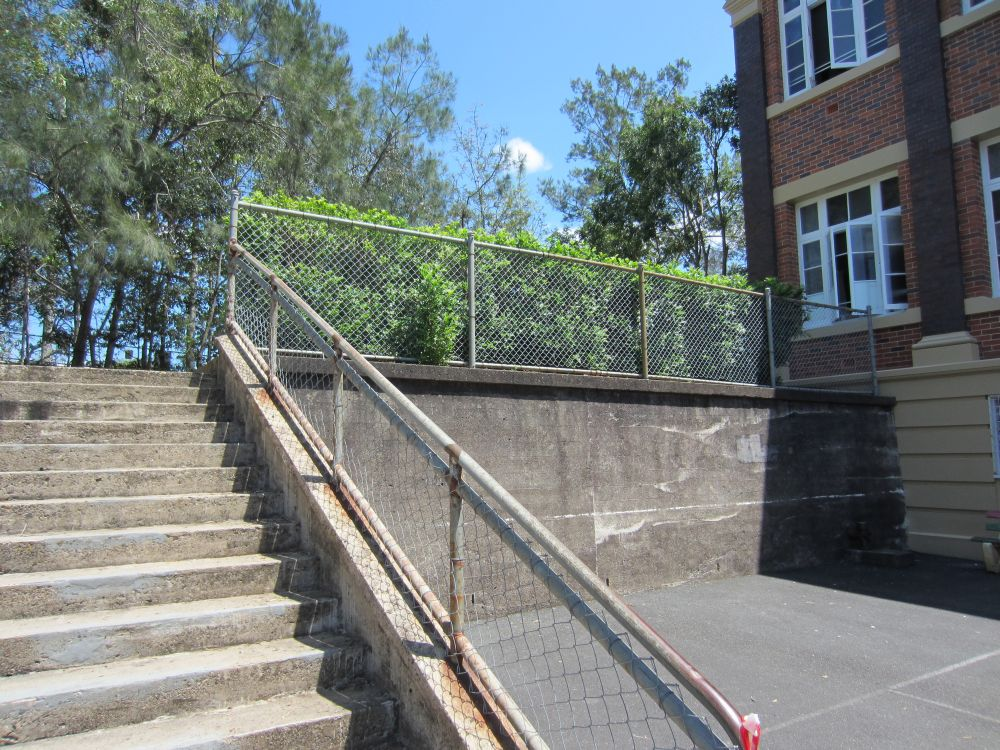
Retaining wall and stair between Block A and tennis courts, 2015

The sloping site is terraced by several Depression-era concrete retaining walls. These are located:

- along the Lugg Street boundary
- between Lugg Street and Block A
- north, east and west of Block A (including underneath a 2009 two storey brick building)
- at the northeastern end of the playing field (c. 1930s)
- in between the school buildings and playing field (pre-1960)

Concrete stairs (c. 1930s) between Block A and tennis courts provide access between the terraces. The terraced nature of the site provides opportunities for views of the surrounding area from within the school grounds and buildings.

The parade ground (1934–1936) east of Block A allows significant views to be obtained of the building's eastern elevation (its recent surface of bitumen is not significant).

An Honour Board (1947) is located in the foyer of Block A, listing the names of former students who served in World War II (WWII).

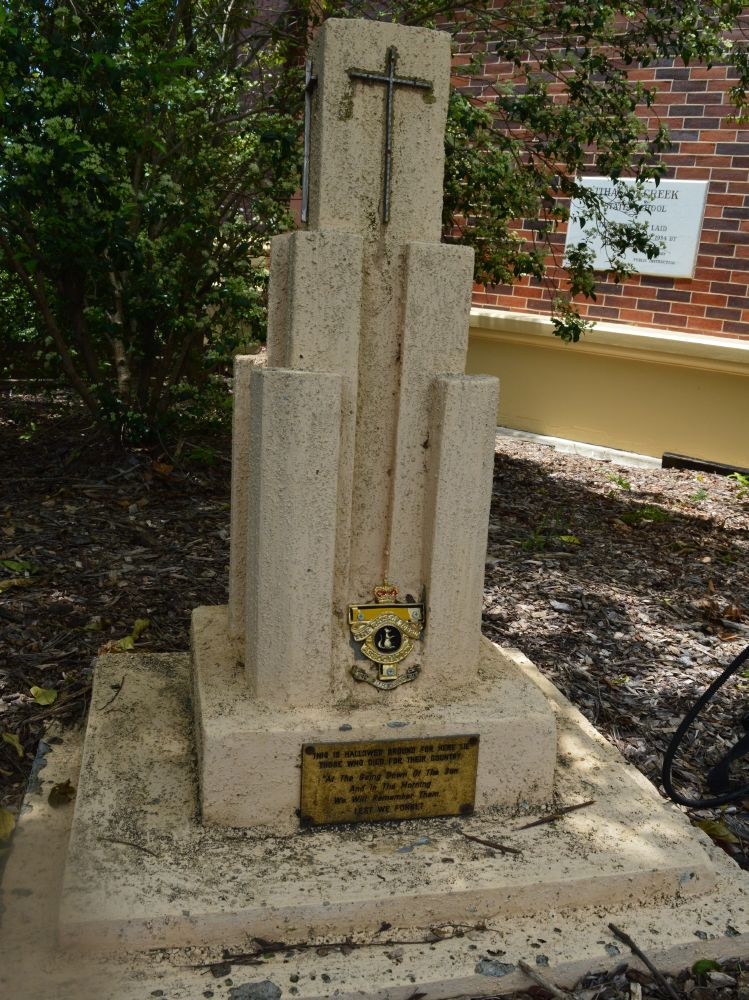
Rats of Tobruk memorial, 2015

A painted concrete WWII memorial (erected after 1954) is located northwest of Block A and is dedicated to the Rats of Tobruk. It is of a stepped, art-deco design, with metal crosses fixed to the highest tier; and stands on a stepped plinth. The memorial displays the crest of the Rats of Tobruk Association, and a plaque with the words:

This is hallowed ground for here lie
those who died for their country
"At the going down of the sun
And in the morning
We will remember them."
Lest We Forget

Note that the memorial and the words upon it are a replica; there are no burials on the school grounds.

=== Other Structures ===
Other buildings, structures, pathways, swimming pools, modern partitions, modern joinery, and sheds within the cultural heritage boundary are not of cultural heritage significance.

== Heritage listing ==
Ithaca Creek State School was listed on the Queensland Heritage Register on 5 February 2016 having satisfied the following criteria.

The place is important in demonstrating the evolution or pattern of Queensland's history.

Ithaca Creek State School (established 1885) is important in demonstrating the evolution of state education and its associated architecture in Queensland. The place retains an excellent example of a government designed Depression-era brick school building (1934–1936), which was an architectural response to prevailing government educational philosophies, set in landscaped grounds with retaining walls, sporting facilities and mature trees.

The Depression-era brick school building and landscaping of the school grounds are the result of the State Government's building and relief work programmes during the 1930s that stimulated the economy and provided work for men unemployed as a result of the Great Depression.

A World War II (WWII) Honour Board (1947) located in the foyer of the Depression-era brick school building and a WWII Memorial commemorating the Rats of Tobruk (post-1954) sited in front of the school building are important in demonstrating the school community's involvement in WWII. War memorials, including honour boards, are a tribute to those who served, and those who died, from a particular community. They are an important element of Queensland's towns and cities and are also important in demonstrating a common pattern of commemoration across Queensland and Australia.

The place is important in demonstrating the principal characteristics of a particular class of cultural places.

Ithaca Creek State School is important in demonstrating the principal characteristics of a Queensland state school. The school comprises a Depression-era brick school building constructed to a government design and a parade ground used as an assembly and play area. These elements are set within a generous, landscaped site that retains mature shade trees, Depression-era terraced retaining walls, and sporting facilities including a playing field and tennis courts with a tennis shed.

The substantial Depression-era brick school building is a highly-intact, excellent example of its type and retains a high degree of integrity. The building demonstrates the principal characteristics of its type, including: its two-storey form, with an undercroft; symmetrical, high-quality design that features classical detailing; loadbearing face brick construction; hipped roof; and prominent and central roof fleche. The building has a linear layout, with rooms accessed by verandahs and corridors, and an undercroft used as an open play space. Typical of this building type, the Depression-era brick school building was located in a growing suburban area at the time of its construction.

The place is important because of its aesthetic significance.

Through its substantial size, high quality materials, face brick exterior, elegant formal composition and decorative treatment, the Depression-era brick school building at Ithaca Creek State School has aesthetic significance due to its expressive attributes, which evoke the sense of progress and permanence that the Queensland Government sought to embody in new public buildings in that era.

The building's assertive massing, classically influenced design, and elegant composition contribute to its dignified streetscape presence, and contrast with the surrounding small-scale residences.

The place has a strong or special association with a particular community or cultural group for social, cultural or spiritual reasons.

Schools have always played an important part in Queensland communities. They typically retain significant and enduring connections with former pupils, parents, and teachers; provide a venue for social interaction and volunteer work; and are a source of pride, symbolising local progress and aspirations.

Ithaca Creek State School has a strong and ongoing association with the surrounding community. It was established in 1885 through the fundraising efforts of the local community and generations of children have been taught there. The place is important for its contribution to the educational development of the community and is a prominent community focal point and gathering place for social and commemorative events with widespread community support.

== Notable people ==
Students:

- Arch Bevis, Member of the Australian House of Representatives
- Lloyd Rees, landscape painter

Teachers:

- William Field Lloyd, Member of the Queensland House of Representatives
