= Marc Clark =

British-born Australian sculptor (1923–2021)

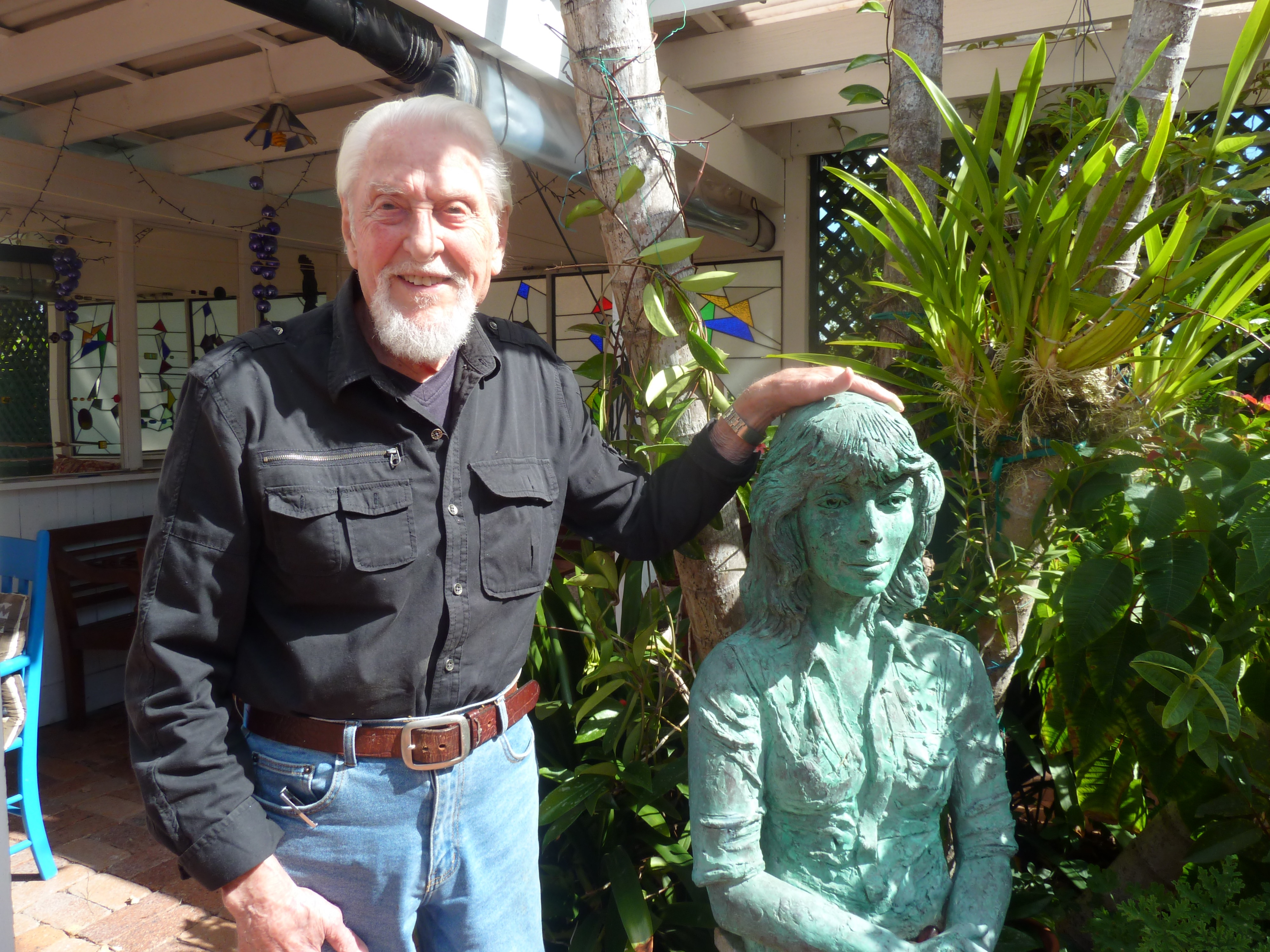
- Clark in 2016
- Born: 20 October 1923; Surrey, England
- Died: 12 September 2021 (aged 97); Australia

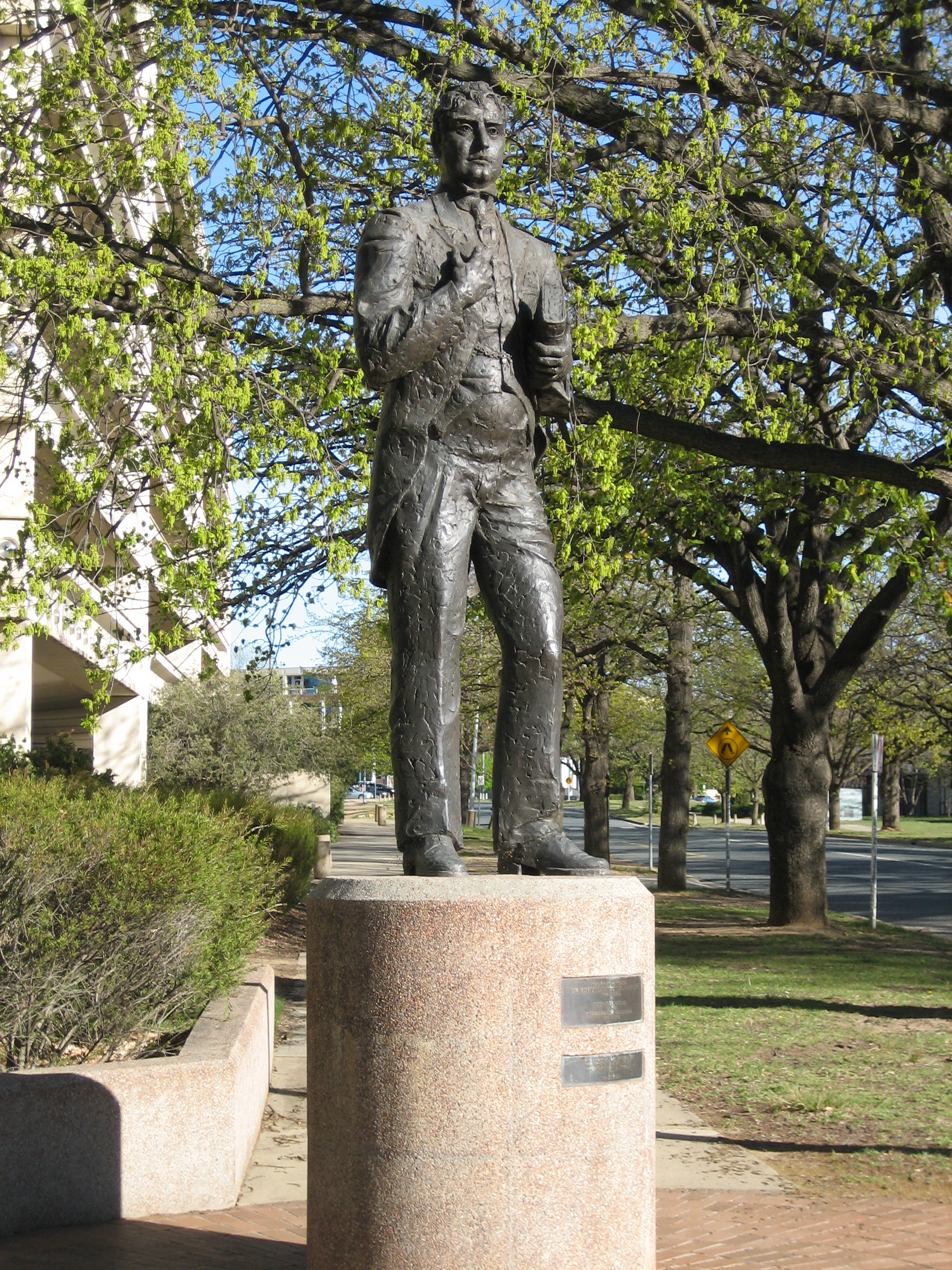
Sir Edmund Barton, outside Barton Offices, Canberra

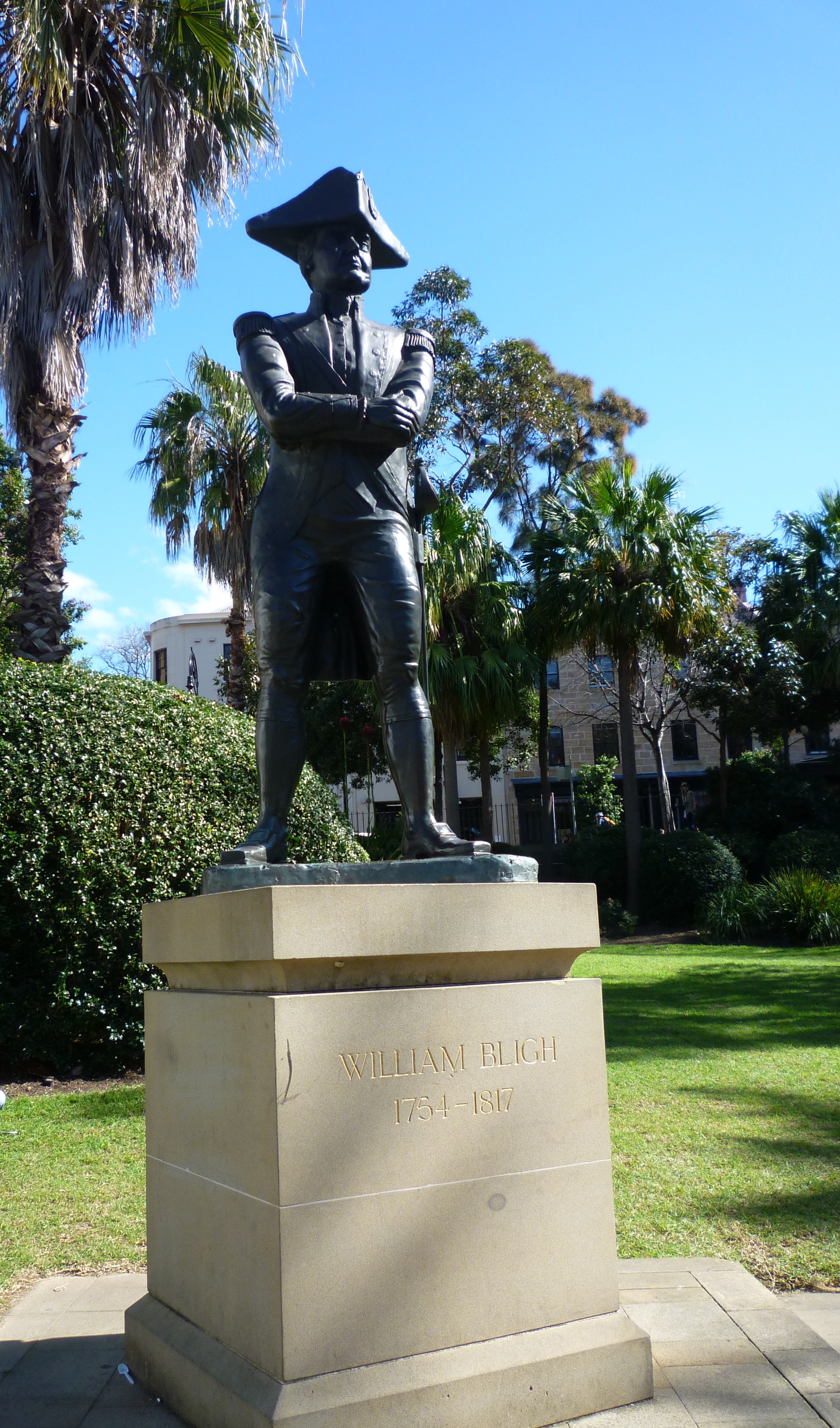
Governor Bligh, Bligh & Barney Reserve, The Rocks

Marc Clark (20 October 1923 – 12 September 2021) was a British-born Australian academic, sculptor and printmaker.

Clark's sculptures can be found in parks in Melbourne, Sydney and Canberra in Australia and in Tonga.

== Early life ==
Marc Clark was born in Surrey, England in October 1923. At age 14, he enrolled in the Sydney Cooper School of Art in Canterbury, England, where he studied for four years.

During World War II, Clark served with the 9th Queens' Royal Lancers of the British Army in North Africa, Sicily, Italy and Austria. In 1948, he enrolled in the Royal College of Art (RCA). In 1951, Clark received a one-year travelling Scholarship from the RCA, which he spent in France.

== Teaching ==
After graduation from RCA, Clark lectured at the Watford College of the Arts from 1953 to 1962. He then moved to Australia, when he taught basic design at the Caulfield Institute of Technology. After six months, Clark was appointed Master of Drawing at the National Gallery of Victoria Art School. Clark introduced Clay Portraiture and lectured in Human Anatomy.

When the new Victorian College of the Arts introduced a school of sculpture, Clark was appointed Senior Lecturer. During his decades at the college, he frequently served as Dean of the Art School.

Clark retired from the college in 1984 and moved to Queensland. He continued to work as a Visiting Lecturer at several schools, including Dandenong TAFE, Melbourne University, Hervey Bay Senior College, and Deakin University over various periods. He retired from lecturing in 2007.

== Work ==
Sasha Grishin said about Clark:

"A major preoccupation with his art has been with the notion of timelessness, an art which more that commemorate an individual person's ego or freeze an historical event in time."

After finishing his studies at RCA, Clark produced sculptures including Peter Cheyney's hands and a death mask of Evan Walters.

Clark's monumental works in Australian parks and gardens include the Sculpture of Captain James Cook in Fitzroy Gardens in Melbourne, Victoria. In 1971 he was commissioned by the Government of Tonga to create a statue of Queen Sālote Tupou III. This is located at Nukuʻalofa, Tonga.

A statue Edmund Barton located at Barton House, in Canberra, was the next major work completed by Clark in 1981. In 1983 Clark contributed a cast of the 'Eternal Flame' to the Rats of Tobruk Memorial in Canberra.

From 1985 to 1987 Clark was commissioned to provide three bronze sculptures.

- Captain Matthew Flinders, R.N., R.N., in Mornington Park, Mornington, Victoria,
- Captain William Bligh, R.N., at Cadmans Cottage, Sydney
- Baron Sir Ferdinand von Mueller in the Botanical Gardens, Melbourne.

Clark's works in the Australian Federal Parliament House Art Collection include 'Alpha and Omega', 'Ancient Sites' and 'Monument to a Hero II'.

Lenton Parr commented,

"Marc Clark is widely acknowledged to be a very accomplished and versatile sculptor who has created with equal assurance a succession of commissioned memorial works on a monumental scale and a large number of other sculptures more personally conceived and motivated by his own powers of observation and invention."

Clark's abstract works form a human relationship to figurative expression through the portrayal of personal and human elements in geometrical forms. The bronze sculpture Stairway to Nowhere (Now in Queensland Art gallery collection) represents his own experience of the result of bombing in WW2 where functional buildings were transformed into symbols of futility. (Dr Sasha Grishin)

== Personal life ==
Clark married his wife, Waltraud, in Melbourne, Australia in 1983.

He died on 12 September 2021, at the age of 97.
