= Tobruk Ferry Service =

Supply of WWII Allied forces in Siege of Tobruk

The Tobruk Ferry Service (also known as the Tobruk Ferry Run) was the name given to the force of Royal Navy and Royal Australian Navy ships involved in the supply of Allied forces during the Siege of Tobruk.

== History ==
The aim of the Ferry Service was to keep the besieged Allied forces supplied with ammunition, gun barrels, and medical supplies, while evacuating wounded personnel.

The initial supply runs to Tobruk were performed by the ships of the 10th Destroyer Flotilla (which included the five First World War-era destroyers of the Australian 'Scrap Iron Flotilla') operating independently. A typical run saw a destroyer spend the night loading at Alexandria, sail early in the morning for Tobruk, where the ship would arrive around midnight. After supplies were unloaded and wounded loaded, the destroyer would sail for Mersa Matruh, where the wounded were exchanged for more supplies. The destroyer would return to Tobruk for a second evening, then head back to Alexandria. The danger of attack by air and sea prompted the admiral at Alexandria, after advice from one of the destroyer captains, to send ships in pairs: they could help protect each other, and if one were disabled or sunk, the second could provide assistance or recover survivors.

== Losses ==
During the operation of the Ferry Service, two destroyers, three sloops, and nineteen smaller vessels were lost. The ships lost included:

- HMAS Waterhen, destroyer
- HMS Defender, destroyer
- HMS Auckland, sloop
- HMAS Parramatta, sloop
- HMS Ladybird, gunboat
- HMS Latona, cruiser minelayer

== See also ==
- Alfred Brian Palmer
