= Chinese National Relief and Rehabilitation Administration =

Chinese relief organisation

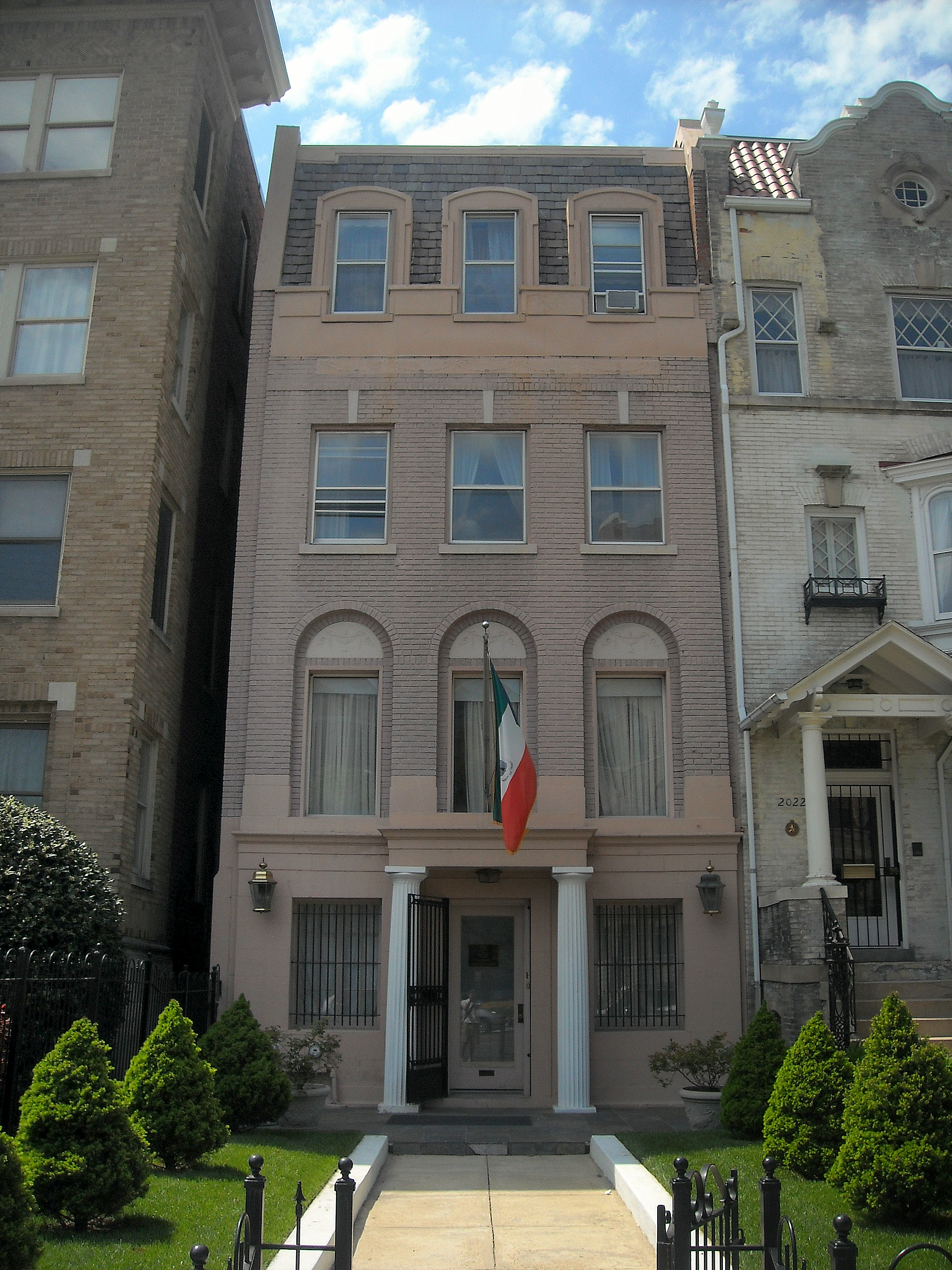
Former CNRRA office in Washington, D.C.

The Chinese National Relief and Rehabilitation Administration (or CNRRA -pronounced "Sin-rah") was an organisation established by the government of the Republic of China to distribute relief aid after from 1945 to 1947. Under an agreement with the United Nations Relief and Rehabilitation Administration (UNRRA) it was authorized to take possession of relief supplies and to distribute them. Critics have alleged that much of the aid was misappropriated.
