= Rats of Tobruk Memorial =

Coordinates: 35.288°S 149.143°E

The Rats of Tobruk Memorial is on Anzac Parade, the principal ceremonial and memorial avenue of Canberra, Australia.

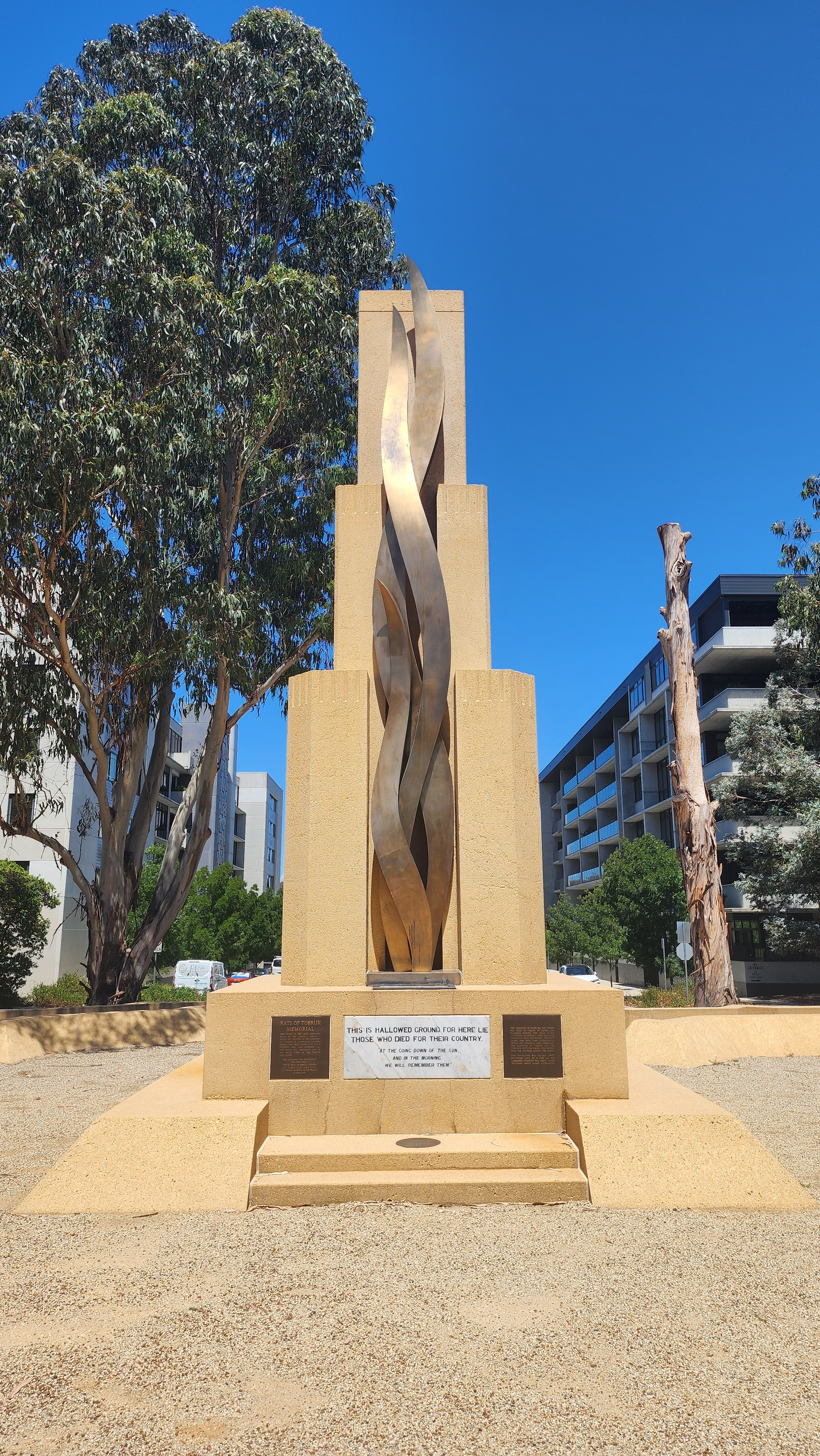

The German siege of the Libyan Mediterranean Sea port town of Tobruk began on 10 April 1941. After desperate fighting, most of the Australian forces were relieved by October 1941. However, the town was continuously contested until the Allied victory at El Alamein in 1942. The Allied defence of Tobruk lengthened German supply lines and diverted troops who might have been deployed against Allied troops elsewhere. This memorial commemorated the endurance of those who were besieged, who were given the honorific title, "Rats of Tobruk".

The memorial was unveiled on 13 April 1983 by the Governor-General of Australia, Sir Ninian Stephen.

A time capsule was laid at the memorial on 17 April 1991 to commemorate the 50th anniversary of the siege of Tobruk, by Mr J.N. Madeley, the Federal President of the "Rats of Tobruk Association".

The last official ROT member died in August 2024, just shy of the individuals 103rd birthday.

== Sculpture ==
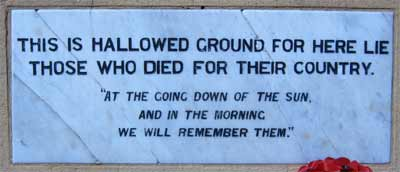
Inscription stone from original memorial at Tobruk: This is hallowed ground for here lie those who died for their country.

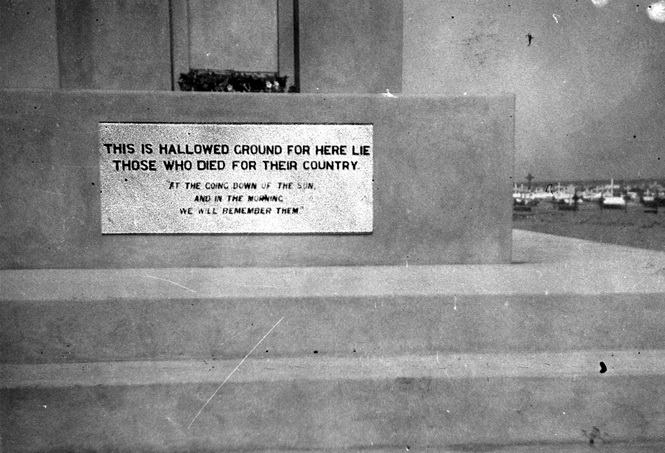
Inscription stone at the original memorial at Tobruk, 1944

The replica memorial is based on the 1941 memorial in the Tobruk War Cemetery, built by Australian soldiers during the siege, which has since been destroyed. Incorporated into the memorial is the original inscription stone, the only surviving relic of that memorial, and at one time a front step of the Tobruk Post Office.

The memorial takes the form of an Obelisk. Surrounding walls portray the perimeter defences; the design recalls the area within which the siege took place; the coastline and harbour are at front, with the defence positions at the rear of the memorial. The eternal flame fabricated from bronze, sculpted and designed by the Melbourne artist Marc Clark (sculptor) and was installed in 1984.

The memorial was designed by architects Denton Corker Marshall.
