= Scrap Iron Flotilla =

Australian destroyer group during World War II

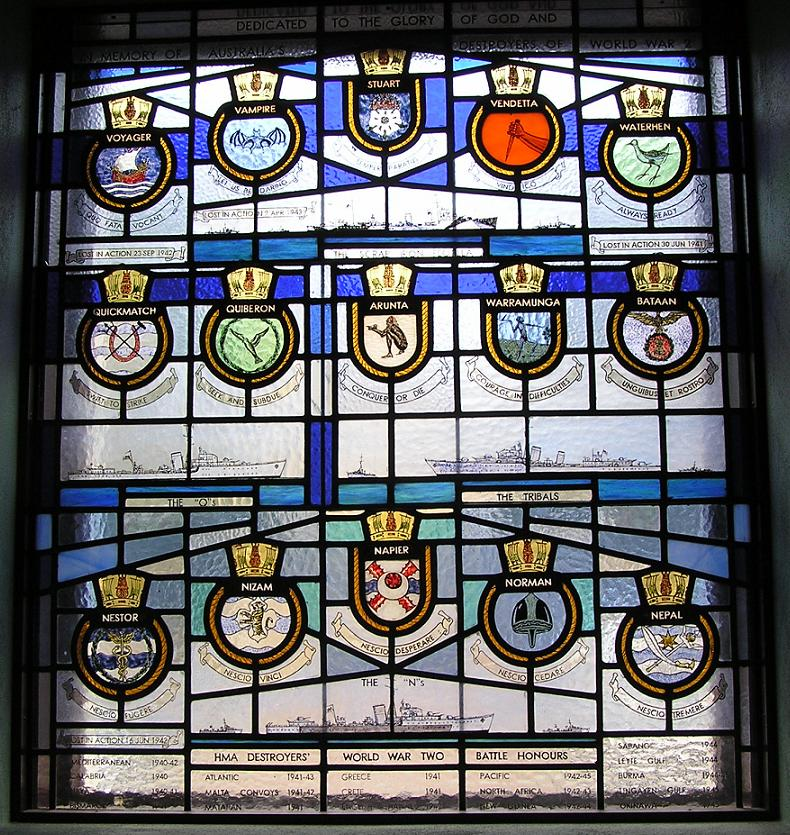
The Scrap Iron Flotilla in the top row of a stained glass window honouring Australian destroyers of World War II, in Garden Island Naval Chapel, Sydney

The Scrap Iron Flotilla was an Australian destroyer group that operated in the Mediterranean and Pacific during World War II. The name was bestowed upon the group by Nazi Propaganda Minister Joseph Goebbels.

The flotilla consisted of five Royal Australian Navy (RAN) destroyers. The five ships of the flotilla had been Royal Navy ships that had been built and served during the First World War and transferred to the RAN in the 1930s. HMAS Waterhen was sunk in the Mediterranean in 1941, HMAS Vampire was sunk in the Indian Ocean in 1942, and HMAS Voyager was sunk near Timor in 1942. HMAS Stuart and HMAS Vendetta survived the war.

The story of the ships in the flotilla, up to 1943, was recounted in the book Scrap-Iron Flotilla by John F. Moyes, who served as a Sub-Lieutenant RANVR on HMAS Voyager later in the war, and collected many stories from the crews. Moyes was on HMAS Voyager when she was sunk, but survived.

== The flotilla ==
- HMAS Stuart (D00)
- HMAS Voyager (D31)
- HMAS Vampire (D68)
- HMAS Vendetta (D69)
- HMAS Waterhen (D22)

== "Scrap Iron Flotilla" march ==
The flotilla has been commemorated in a 2010 march, Scrap Iron Flotilla, composed by Leading Seaman Martyn Hancock of the Royal Australian Navy Band. It is available via the Royal Australian Navy's RAN Media YouTube channel, along with notes on the composition, in a posting entitled Scrap Iron Flotilla Theme from 29 March 2010. The opening bars of the march were influenced by the theme music of the 1970s BBC television series Warship.
