= Operation Grog =

British operation during World War II

- Part of the Battle of the Mediterranean of the Second World War
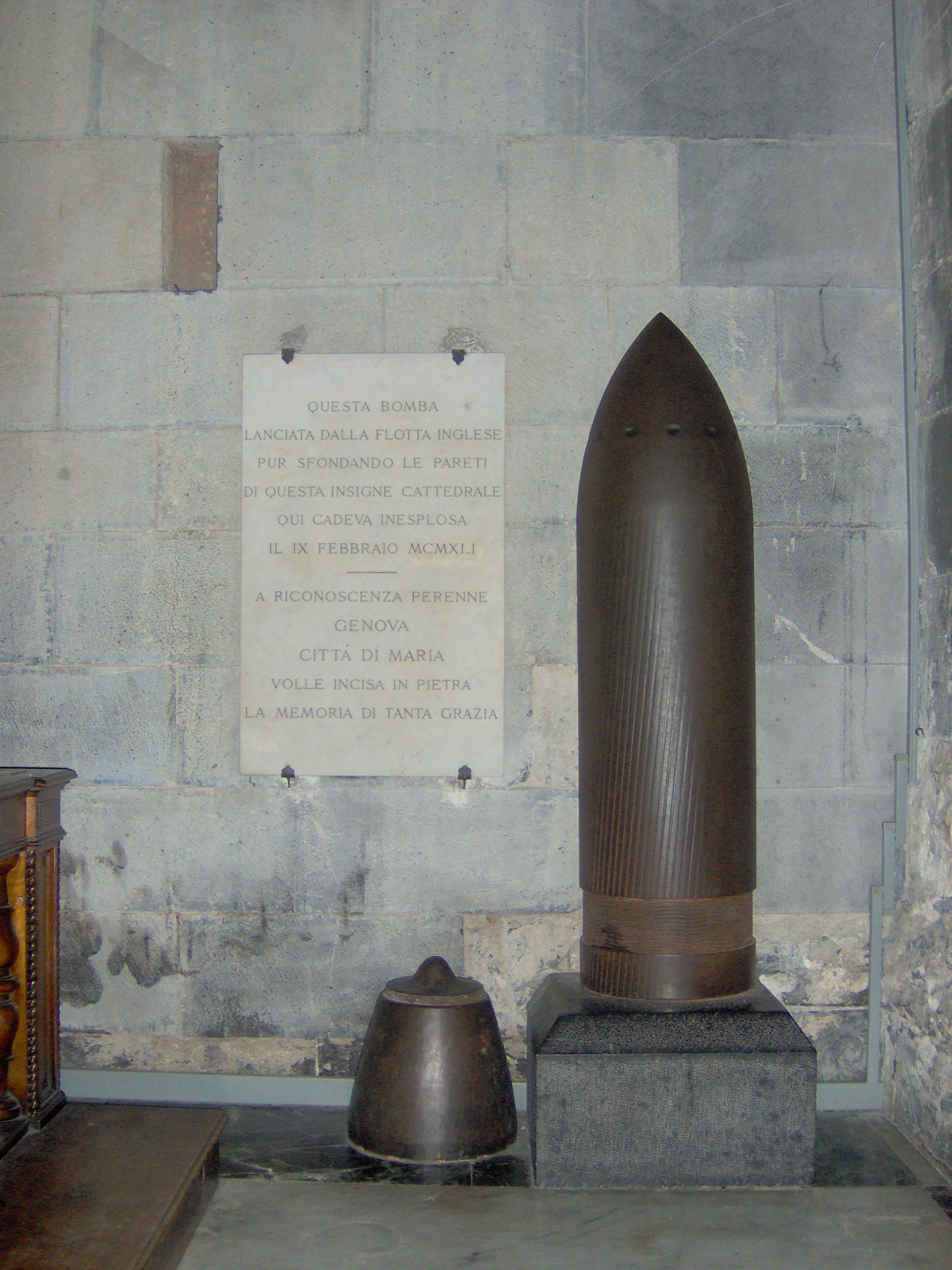
- Armour-piercing shell fired by HMS Malaya, in the nave of Genoa Cathedral
Date	February 9, 1941
Location	Genoa, Italy 44°24′40″N 8°55′58″E
Result	British victory

Belligerents
United Kingdom	Italy

Commanders and leaders
James Somerville	Ferdinando Casardi

Strength
1 Aircraft carrier; 1 Battleship; 1 Battlecruiser; 1 Light cruiser; 4 destroyers	Anti-aircraft and coastal artillery

Casualties and losses
1 Swordfish aircraft	5 cargo ships sunk; 18 damaged (British sources); 1 training ship sunk; 2 ships damaged (Italian sources); 14 lighters sunk; 144 killed and 242 wounded; Port damaged

Operation Grog was the code name for a British sea and air bombardment of Genoa and La Spezia on 9 February 1941, by the Royal Navy and Fleet Air Arm. Force H from Gibraltar, consisting of the battleship HMS Malaya, the aircraft carrier HMS Ark Royal, the battlecruiser HMS Renown and the light cruiser HMS Sheffield with ten fleet destroyers.

Supermarina, the Italian naval headquarters, received information that Force H had sailed but mistakenly expected that the British were on a Club Run operation to reinforce Malta and were deceived by the British suddenly turning north-east instead of keeping on to the east.

== Background ==
=== British plans ===
After the Battle of Taranto (11/12 November 1940) the commander of Force H, Admiral James Somerville, looked for opportunities to attack the Italian fleet in the west coast ports to which it has withdrawn. Intelligence in late 1940 implied that a Littorio-class battleship was at Genoa, being repaired and that the port had deep waters nearby that were impossible to mine and was almost undefended.

At the end of January British intelligence reported that there might be two battleships and an 8-inch (heavy) cruiser at Genoa and two at La Spezia with at least two 6-inch (light) cruisers about 40 nmi (74 km; 46 mi) down the coast. There were also tentative suggestions that an expedition was being prepared at Genoa against the Balearic Islands, giving the operation a sense of urgency. The Diga di Santa Chiara (Tirso hydroelectric dam) in Sardinia was also to be attacked as a diversion from the Genoa bombardment.

An attack on Genoa risked HMS Ark Royal or HMS Renown suffering damage 700 nmi (1,300 km; 810 mi) from Gibraltar. If the hazard was accepted, there was no certainty of an Italian battleship being present to shoot at. If an attack succeeded, it might be a big blow to Italian morale, divert aircraft and ships from more important areas, damage the Italian war economy and add to Italian apprehensions.

Despite the arrival of the Luftwaffe in the Mediterranean, Admiral Andrew Cunningham, the commander of the Mediterranean Fleet was favourable to an operation in the Gulf of Genoa and the Admiralty in London agreed to the scheme as soon as repairs to HMS Malaya were complete. The Admiralty wanted Operation Picket at the same time, an attack on the Tirso hydroelectric dam.

Reconnaissance to discover what ships were at Genoa was important because armour-piercing ammunition was needed for them and if land targets were engaged, high explosive ammunition would be necessary. It would take Renown ten minutes to change from one nature to the other, a delay that would not be practical for a bombardment. On 23 January, the British thought that Littorio might be in the dry dock with Giulio Cesare alongside. By chance, a photographic reconnaissance (PR) Spitfire was in Malta and flew a reconnaissance sortie but it was shot down.

=== Operations Picket and Result ===
The operation began on the evening of 31 January 1941, Force H, comprising Renown, Malaya, Ark Royal and Sheffield, with ten destroyers, sailed from Gibraltar to attack the Tirso hydroelectric Dam in Sardinia at 40°02′N, 08°54′E on 2 February and then to bombard Genoa on 3 February. The Mediterranean Fleet made a sortie westwards from Alexandria, as a diversion. A reconnaissance aircraft of the Regia Aeronautica spotted the ships south of the Balearic Islands on 1 February and Supermarina alerted the battlefleet. At 6:00 a.m. on 2 February, west of Sardinia, eight Swordfish torpedo bombers of 810 Naval Air Squadron (NAS) took off into the night sky from Ark Royal for Operation Picket. Having made landfall, the Swordfish flew into rain and severe icing at 5,000 ft (1,500 m), then as they flew up the valley to the dam, they were engaged by massed anti-aircraft fire that became intense over the reservoir.

The Admiralty had expected only three feet of concrete on top of the dam and little in the way of defences. The crews saw no explosions and the dam appeared to remain intact, after being hit by three of the eight torpedoes, to their great disappointment. (Note: That the defenders were alert on a Sunday caused suspicion that there had been careless talk at Gibraltar. Investigation revealed that the loading of HE ammunition and the rehearsals of air observation and communication had led to an accurate inference being made.) An Admiralty view that torpedoes were useless against dams was borne out. All but one Swordfish were back on Ark Royal by 8:45 a.m. one having been shot down and the crew captured. The weather continued to deteriorate with gale force winds from the north-east, to the extent that Ark Royal was dipping its flight deck into the water. Force H reduced speed to 15 kn (28 km/h; 17 mph), the maximum speed for the destroyers in such conditions. Slow progress to the north and west delayed the force and the last stage of the voyage to Genoa would have been in daylight; Somerville judged this to be too risky and cancelled Operation Result, turned back for Gibraltar and reached port on 4 February; some of the destroyers needed repairs and this delayed a second attempt.

=== Operation Grog ===
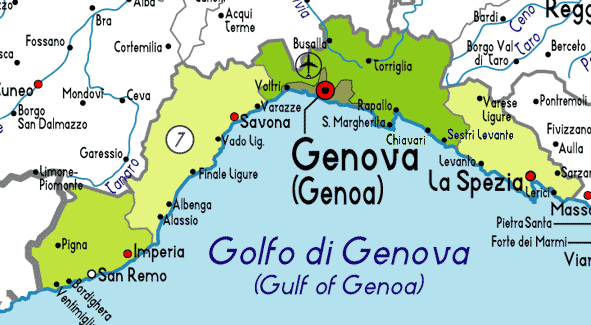
Map of Genoa in Liguria

Because of the security scare after the first attempt, orders were issued for a mission against French warships in the western Mediterranean as a deception. HMS Resolution received instructions to organise boarding and steaming parties to be embarked the destroyers involved in the operation. Real orders, with a new code name (Operation Grog) were issued to senior officers in sealed envelopes, to be opened once at sea. It was not possible to repeat the operation until 6 February when Force H was to be divided, part to sail eastwards and one westwards, to rendezvous on 8 February north of the Balearic Islands.

If aircraft were detected by radar, the force was temporarily to turn to the south-east towards Sardinia. The destroyers HMS Firedrake and Jupiter were to send misleading wireless signals when off Menorca, as Force H closed on Genoa, also intended to reinforce the impression that Sardinia was the target. Ark Royal, with three destroyer escorts, was to detach to bomb an oil refinery at Livorno and plant magnetic mines off La Spezia. The Royal Air Force (RAF) at Malta were asked to attack Cagliari or Alghero but had no aircraft suitable for the raids. Force H was to pass between Ibiza and Majorca and then head direct for the north end of the Tyrrhenian Sea, entering from the south and on the east of the Gulf of Genoa, near Rapallo–Portofino, to skirt the coast and bombard Genoa while heading westwards, from about 33 km/h; 21 mph (18 kn). From the morning of 8 February, reconnaissance aircraft were to search for ships and aircraft.

Force H was to form three groups, the first with Renown (flagship), Malaya, Ark Royal and Sheffield and a destroyer screen formed by the third group, the destroyers Duncan, Isis, Firedrake and Jupiter, to leave Gibraltar at 4:00 p.m. on 6 February and head westwards, to simulate an escort for a Britain-bound convoy that was assembling near Gibraltar and then turn back in small detachments to reunite to the east of Gibraltar. The second group consisted of the destroyers Encounter, Fearless, Foxhound, Foresight, Fury, and Jersey, to steal out of Gibraltar, one or two ships at a time between 12:00 a.m. and 2:00 p.m. on 6th February to head eastwards, as if on patrol or an exercise. Once out of sight of land the destroyers would meet for an anti-submarine sweep at a steady speed on a heading to rendezvous with the first group at 8:30 a.m. on 8 February, north of Majorca.

== Prelude ==
=== 6–7 February ===
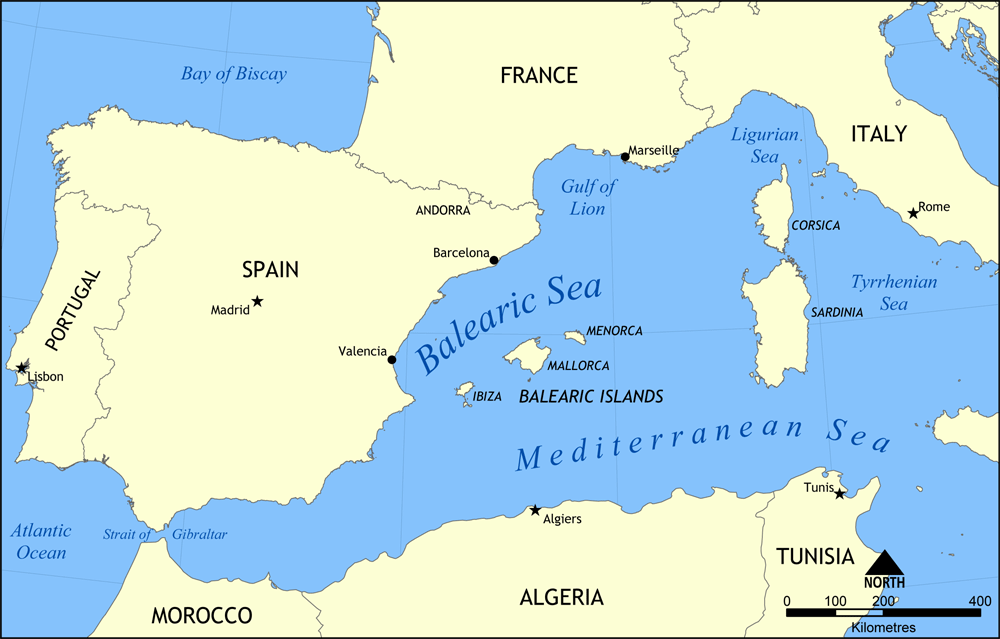
Map of the western Mediterranean Sea

Renown, Malaya, Ark Royal and Sheffield (first group) screened by the third group, Duncan, Isis, Firedrake and Jupiter, departed Gibraltar on schedule at 4:00 p.m. on 6 February, sailing to the westward, in good visibility apart from a few rain squalls rain squalls. The moon set at 3:20 a.m. on 7 February. After dusk on 6 February, the first group changed course to the east, the small parts of the force combining when about 56 nmi (104 km; 64 mi) to the east of Gibraltar at 3:00 a.m. on 7 February. The second group made a quiet departure from Gibraltar left harbour, one or two ships at a time from 12:00 on 6th February and conducted the planned anti-submarine operation en route to its rendezvous with the first group at 8:30 a.m. on 8 February, north of Majorca.

The voyage eastwards was quiet; at 7:30 a.m. on 7 February, Ark Royal kept a standing anti-submarine patrol airborne for the day. There was good visibility and a steady breeze, that dropped by 11:00 a.m. with a light haze forming, that reduced visibility to 10 to 15 nmi (19 to 28 km; 12 to 17 mi) and lasted for the rest of the day. Drills were undertaken to rehearse the anti-aircraft gunners and six Skuas dive bombed the ships At 11:55 a.m. when about 200 nmi (370 km; 230 mi) east of Gibraltar Firedrake had an Asdic contact and dropped two depth charges to no effect. There were no radar contacts all day and on the evening there was a course change to pass between Ibiza at the west end of the Balearic Islands and Mallorca in the night.

=== 8 February ===
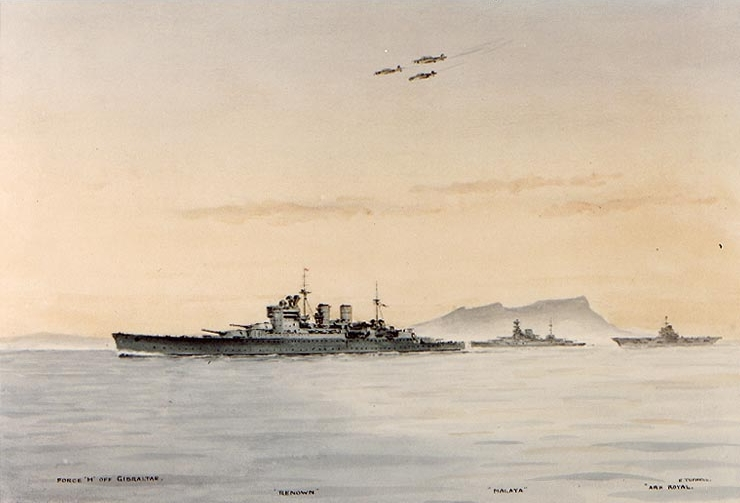
Force H off Gibraltar, watercolour by Edward Tufnell, RN (retired)

At 5:00 a.m. on 8 February another course change to 035° was made to head north-west of the islands, with a submarine alarm that came to nothing. At 8:30 a.m., the second group rendezvoused as planned. For the day the intention was to head to the north-east, while remaining undetected. An anti-submarine patrol took off at 7:20 a.m. followed by a Fulmar patrol at 9:30 a.m. and both patrol were continued all day. The aircraft were instructed to keep away from merchant ships and warn the force so it could turn away and avoid being seen. As soon as there was a radar contact of an aircraft, course was changed to the south-east.

The desired impression was that the ships were heading for Sardinia and about six aircraft saw the fleet. Ark Royal suffered landing accidents to a Fulmar and a Skua causing delays and flying ended for the day at 6:00 p.m. Soon afterwards course was changed to 90° at 18 kn (33 km/h; 21 mph) until 7:00 p.m., when a new course was set at 50° and 21 kn (39 km/h; 24 mph). At 11:20 p.m. Renown was 25 nmi (46 km; 29 mi) and 138° from the Porquerolles light in the Îles d'Hyères and the ships headed east-north-east. About 200 nmi (370 km; 230 mi) to the south-west, eastwards of Minorca, Firedrake and Jupiter began the wireless deception. (Note: At 2:20 a.m. unbeknownst to Force H, it passed about 30 nmi (56 km; 35 mi) north of the Italian battle fleet that had sailed from La Spezia and was steering to the south-west to meet the cruisers from Messina.)

== Bombardment ==
=== Genoa ===
Admiralty chart showing the Portofino headland (top left)

At 6:49 a.m. on 9 February, Portofino, 12 nmi (22 km; 14 mi) east of Genoa, came into view. At 6:53 a.m, course was changed to the bombardment course of 290° and the ships slowed to 18 kn (33 km/h; 21 mph). There was thick mist around Portofino and course changes were based on Monte Fasce and Monte Penello, 6 nmi (11 km; 6.9 mi) to the east and north-west of Genoa. The Walrus aircraft on Sheffield and the Swordfish on Malaya took off and at 7:10 a.m. the Walrus, observing for Renown, reported that there were no battleships. Three minutes later Renown engaged the alternative land targets. The shore was obscured by the haze and when Renown commenced firing at 7:14 a.m. Genoa was invisible from the ships and the bombardment was conducted by indirect fire from 23,500 to 18,000 yd (21,500 to 16,500 m).

The first shells from Renown fell south of Principe Umberto pier and were adjusted by the Walrus to the Ansaldo works, railway yards and factories on either side of the Polcevera river, from where explosions and fires were seen. The civilian harbour was bombarded next and a merchant ship was hit. Shells landing near the power station set off a big explosion and an oil tank was set on fire, its smoke and that from warehouses, making it impossible to spot the fall of some shot. Soon afterwards, shells were seen to explode near the Biagio Assereto and Caracciolo bridges. The power station was hit and then shells were walked up the west bank of the Polcevera and on to the Ansaldo works, by when smoke was making it hard to see. Renown fired its secondary armament at the waterfront during the main bombardment.

The target for Malaya was the dry docks and vicinity. Big explosions were seen in the docks and warehouses nearby. Smoke got in the way and obscured some salvoes, the last four of which were seen to hit houses to the north-east of the docks. A salvo from Malaya landed 50 to 200 yd (46 to 183 m) short of the Italian battleship Duilio, that was in dry dock north of Molo Giano (Giano Pier) and no damage to Duilio was reported. The bombardment from Sheffield fell short in the sea at first and was easily seen. When the range was found, rapid fire began on factories at the mouth of the Polcevera valley. Fires and two big explosions were seen and as smoke spread a tanker moving off the port was fired at and straddled but not hit. Shore batteries of two 15-inch, two 7.5-inch and eight 6-inch guns replied by aiming at the flashes of the British guns, firing fifty rounds to no effect. The British aircraft received anti-aircraft fire that caused no damage. During the bombardment, the two destroyers closest to the shore made smoke, in case more shore guns joined in. Four merchant ships and a training ship were sunk and 18 vessels were damaged; many shells overshot into the town and 144 civilians were killed. "Cease fire" was ordered at 7:45 a.m. by when, Renown had fired 125 and Malaya 148 rounds of 15-inch shell and Sheffield 782 rounds of 6-inch. The spotter aircraft landed on Ark Royal, the ships turning to meet it about 35 nmi (65 km; 40 mi) south of Genoa.

=== Livorno ===
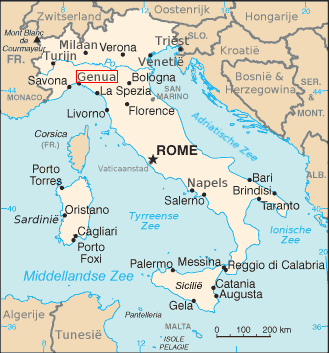
Map of Italy showing Livorno, La Spezia and Genoa

After detaching at 4:00 a.m. Ark Royal turned to the east and at 5:05 a.m., about 70 nmi (130 km; 81 mi) west of Livorno and a similar distance from La Spezia, 14 Swordfish carrying four 250 lb (110 kg) General Purpose bombs and sixteen incendiaries took off, followed by four Swordfish minelayers with magnetic mines. After the attacking aircraft had taken off, three spare observation aircraft with fighter escorts for the Genoa bombardment ships and a Fulmar section to watch the skies around patrol Ark Royal took off.

The bombers attacked the Azienda oil refinery, eleven of the Swordfish bombed the target causing fires and an explosion but no certain judgement could be made as to the damage inflicted. At 6:45 a.m. a couple of heavy anti-aircraft guns opened fire as the attack began and about five minutes later the fire increased considerably and one Swordfish was shot down. Two bombers made the wrong landfall and bombed the alternative targets of Pisa airfield and railway junction.

=== La Spezia ===
Map pf La Spezia showing the breakwater

As Livorno was being bombed, three Swordfish minelayers approached La Spezia and at 7:15 a,m, the raid began. The Swordfish attacked by gliding over the town that was incompletely blacked-out and at the harbour, two attempted to mine the western entrance and one the eastern entrance. The fourth Swordfish followed a reciprocal course to plant its mine the western entrance. It took until 7:38 a.m. for the local Naval command to telephone Supermarina, noting that that an aircraft carrier must be nearby since the aircraft, not reported by the entire Upper-Italy spotting network, could only have come from the sea.

At 8:25 a.m., seventy minutes after the start of the raid and ten minutes after the British opened fire on Genoa, Supermarina received a report from the Portofino semaphore station that at 8:00 a.m. they had seen seven ships 12 nmi (22 km; 14 mi) out heading west. Light anti-aircraft fire began as the aircraft were on their final approach. By 8:48 a.m. the minelayers had returned to Ark Royal. The mines came down near the levante (east) passage, on the San Terenzo–Lerici side, not used by ships, that took the ponente (west) crossing on the Punta Castagna (Castagna Point) – Portovenere (Port of Venus) – Palmaria Island side.

=== Regia Marina ===
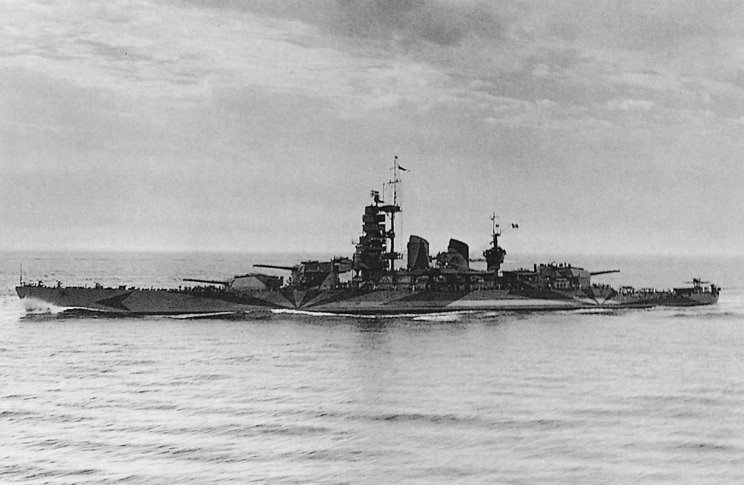
Vittorio Veneto at sea

On 6 February, the Italians knew that Force H was at sea but not its purpose. Supermarina thought possible a raid on Sardinia, the Ligurian coast or an aircraft delivery to Malta. Nothing was known of the whereabouts of Force H on 7 February, then on 8 February carrier fighters were reported to the south of the Balearic Islands. Andrea Doria, Giulio Cesare and Vittorio Veneto sailed with seven destroyers from La Spezia at 7:00 p.m.. The heavy cruisers Bolzano, Trento and Trieste, accompanied by three destroyers, sailed from Messina to rendezvous at 8:00 a.m. on 9 February, 40 nmi (74 km; 46 mi) west of the Strait of Bonifacio between Sardinia and Corsica,180 nmi (330 km; 210 mi) south of Genoa. The fleet was to head west and wait for air reconnaissance to find Force H, a course that, by coincidence, gave the fleet an excellent chance to intercept Force H.

At 9:50 a.m. on 9 February a signal revealed that the British had bombarded Genoa and Supermarina ordered Iachino to turn north; the fleet steamed at 20 kn (37 km/h; 23 mph) with the cruisers 5 nmi (9.3 km; 5.8 mi) ahead of the battleships. At 9:30 a.m. a signal had the British turning back from Genoa at 9:05 a.m. At 10:27 a.m. Force H was reported 40 nmi (74 km; 46 mi) south of Genoa at 9:29.a.m. The British appeared to be heading south and the battle fleet held course. Iachino ordered Trieste to send its aircraft to reconnoitre to the north-west and then towards Genoa. The battle fleet turned to 330° at 24 kn (44 km/h; 28 mph) that put the Italian ships on a converging course with Force H. At 13:00 a.m. an aircraft carrier was reported to be 40 nmi (74 km; 46 mi) to the north-west of Cape Corse, the northernmost point of Corsica, steering 190° and at 10:45 a.m. a signal reported three more ships 75 nmi (139 km; 86 mi) to the west-south-west of Cape Corse at 11:30 a.m., heading east. Force H was 65 nmi (120 km; 75 mi) to the north and the fleets passed by, about 30 nmi (56 km; 35 mi) apart.

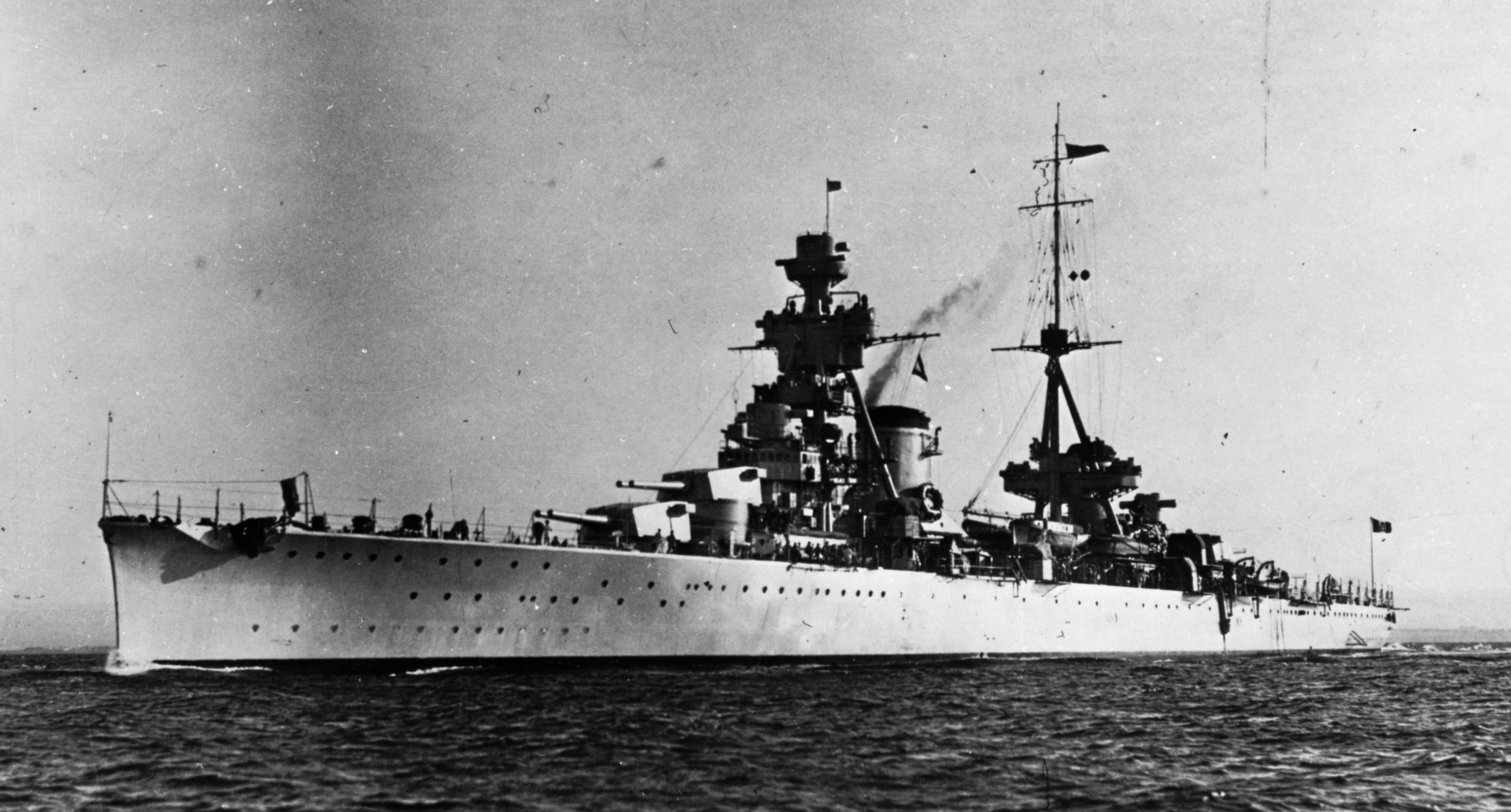
Pre-war photograph of the cruiser Trieste

Signals from Supermarina reinforced the belief that the battlefleet was on the correct course until 3:32 p.m. when a report had an aircraft carrier, two cruisers and nine destroyers seen at 1:00 p.m., 65 nmi (120 km; 75 mi) west of Cape Corse. At 3:40 p.m. masts were seen off the starboard bow but it was a French convoy. Iachino decided that Force H was not heading south, that the British had sailed west, close to the French coast. At 3:50 p.m. Iachino ordered a course change to the west at 24 kn (44 km/h; 28 mph) but found only a bomber floating in the sea 70 nmi (130 km; 81 mi) west of Cape Corse, that had been shot down by seven fighters some hours earlier. (Force H was 60 nmi (110 km; 69 mi) to the south-west). The battle fleet turned eastwards at 7:00 p.m. into the Gulf of Genoa and on 10 February Supermarina ordered the ships back to base.

=== Force H withdrawal ===
Having detached from Force H at 4:00 a.m. with Duncan, Encounter and Isis, by 8:48 a.m. Ark Royal received the observation aircraft, minelayers and bombers, except for one missing Swordfish. The ships rendezvoused with Force H at 9:00 a.m. and the force steamed due south at 22 kn (41 km/h; 25 mph). At 10:00 a.m. the ships turned to 220° and at 10:35 a.m. to 244°. Turning into wind for aircraft operations by Ark Royal slowed the speed of advance to the west-south-west but attacks from the Regia Aeronautica were expected. A standing patrol of six fighters was kept over the fleet that shot down a CANT Z.506B and a CANT Z.1007bis during the day. From about 9:30 Italian aircraft were spotted but there was only one attack, by two Fiat BR.20s, that missed Ark Royal. At noon, an eastbound convoy of seven freighters was spotted and allowed to continue. By 1:00 p.m. overcast and low cloud appeared with the wind blowing from the north-east. At 5:00 p.m. the last radar contact faded and no more aircraft were detected on the voyage. On the night of 9/10 February, Force H made 17 kn (31 km/h; 20 mph) on a course of 232°, passing to the west of the Balearic Islands.

==== Regia Aeronautica ====
A CANT Z.506B from 287a Squadriglia flew on reconnaissance from Elmas in Sardinia with a naval officer on board and spotted Force H at 12:15 p.m. The CANT was attacked by three Skuas from 800 Naval Air Squadron (NAS) and three Fulmars from 808 NAS and shot down into the sea, where the wounded crew were rescued by the destroyer Giuseppe La Masa. A CANT Z.1007B of the 51° Stormo, en route to Alghero in Sardinia from Vicenza, refuelled at Pisa and the crew was sent to search for Force H, with a naval officer on board. At 3:20 p.m. the CANT ran into seven Fulmars from 808 NAS and forced down into the sea where the crew was later rescued by the destroyer Camicia Nera.

=== 10–11 February ===
Soon after dawn broke, five Swordfish took off from Ark Royal to search for ships from Cape Sebastian to Minorca and from Cape San Antonio to Ibiza. Five French and two Spanish ships were reported but all except Maria could not be boarded as they were too close to Spanish territorial waters. A boarding party from Foresight searched Maria and allowed to continue. At 9:15 a.m. Firedrake and Jupiter returned from their wireless diversion and at 2:25 p.m. off Ibiza, RFA Orangeleaf and its two anti-submarine trawler escorts came into view and were ordered back to Gibraltar. Force H turned to 184° at 1:00 p.m. and four aircraft searched for merchant shipping 50 nmi (93 km; 58 mi) from Spanish territorial waters between Valencia to Cartagena and found a French ship off Cape St Antoni. After 6:00 p.m. Ark Royal and three destroyers were ordered to sail independently for flying training. Force H turned west at 2:30 a.m. on 11 February and reached Gibraltar in the afternoon.

== Aftermath ==
=== Analysis ===
In 1959, the British naval official historian, Stephen Roskill, wrote that the Italians were taken by surprise and no steps to defend the Gulf of Genoa. The Italian Admiral Romeo Bernotti the Italians could expect an attack on Sardinia or the Ligurian coast and information that Force H had sailed on 6 February arrived quickly. On 8 February, Iachino had been ordered out to a central position and on 9 February the first information that he received was that aircraft had been reported over the Tirso hydroelectric dam in Sardinia. By the time the Italians headed north, the bombardment had ended. Iachino was well placed to intercept Force H as it returned but received contradictory reports and the catapult aircraft that were under his control, found nothing. Only in the afternoon, after the rescue of the shot-down aircrew, did Iachino realise that it was too late. In 1948, Bernotti blamed poor liaison between Supermarina and Superaereo the Regia Aeronautica equivalent. Roskill wrote that the morale effect of the bombardment was substantial and that the British could sail so close to Italy with impunity was a result of careful planning, resolutely carried through. The raid failed to cause a redistribution of the Regia Aeronautica and the effect on the Italian war economy was slight.

In 2001, Giorgio Giorgerini wrote that there were many civilian casualties, material damage was minimal and the reply of the coastal defences was mediocre and ineffective. In the official analysis, the sighting of the French convoy was judged to be disruptive of the search for Force H. The official historians blamed the convo for diverting the attention of Iachino who turned west, losing the slim chance of finding the British, who had crossed paths with the convoy around 1:00 p.m. and the Italian sighting was at 3:38 p.m. All hope vanished when at 3:32 p.m. Iachino received a telex from Supermarina that a British force had been sighted at 1:00 p.m., 65 nmi (120 km; 75 mi) west of Cape Corso. Iachino considered it pointless to continue the pursuit southwards, thinking that the only chance of an encounter could be by heading west. The bombardment of Genoa was another failure for the Regia Marina after the Battle of Cape Spartivento (27 November 1940) and foreshadowed the defeats to come. The demoralising failure of not finding Force H, left Mussolini furious that his fleet and air force that he had built, proved so incapable against an opponent that had ventured into Italian home waters, 50 nmi (93 km; 58 mi) from the anchorage of Italian battle fleet.

In 2009, Raymond Dannreuther likened the raid to those by the Germans on British east coast ports in the First World War in which the approach could be surreptitious with a far greater chance of being intercepted on the return voyage. Force H was back in Gibraltar on 11 February, having surprised the Italians, for the loss of one Swordfish. It was also a surprise that the Italians had failed to patrol the approaches to Genoa and on the way there and back the force passed close to the Italian battle fleet. The participants in the raid were as delighted with their success as their Italian counterparts suffered "gloom and anger". Civilian morale was depressed far more than by air attacks. The British public took the raid as good news as they were being subjected to The Blitz and next of kin in the Mediterranean suffered anxiety about their families at home. Churchill was pleased with the raid and broadcast that the Italians deserved to be punished for following Mussolini and that he hoped that the French public had been heartened by the evidence that Britannia still ruled the waves.

=== Casualties ===
In 1978 Artieri wrote that the freighters SS Salpi and SS Garibaldi were seriously damaged and the civilian training ship SS Garaventa was sunk. In 2005, Rohwer and Hümmelchen wrote that Force H killed 144 people, sank four merchant ships and damaged 18 more. In 2009 Vincent O'Hara wrote that four merchant ships and a training ship were sunk and 144 civilians were killed in the town. In 2011, Ermingo Bagnasco reported the loss of 14 lighters and MS Antonietta Madre and George Titterton wrote that there were 144 civilian dead and 272 wounded in the bombardment. In 2009, Raymond Dannreuther wrote that a Swordfish bomber was shot down over Livorno and the crew captured.

== Orders of battle ==
=== Royal Navy ===
Force H
Ship	Flag	Type	Notes
HMS Malaya	Royal Navy	Queen Elizabeth-class battleship	
HMS Ark Royal	Royal Navy	Aircraft carrier	30 Swordfish, 24 Fulmars
HMS Sheffield	Royal Navy	Town-class cruiser	
Group 2
HMS Encounter	Royal Navy	E-class destroyer	
HMS Fearless	Royal Navy	F-class destroyer	
HMS Foxhound	Royal Navy	F-class destroyer	
HMS Foresight	Royal Navy	F-class destroyer	
HMS Fury	Royal Navy	F-class destroyer	
HMS Jersey	Royal Navy	J-class destroyer	
Group 3
HMS Duncan	Royal Navy	D-class destroyer	
HMS Firedrake	Royal Navy	F-class destroyer	
HMS Isis	Royal Navy	I-class destroyer	
HMS Jupiter	Royal Navy	J-class destroyer	

=== Italian merchant ships ===
Ships sunk or damaged in Genoa harbour, 9 February 1941
Ship	Year	Flag	GRT	Notes
Antoinetta Madre		Merchant Navy		
Garaventa		Merchant Navy		Civilian training ship, sunk
Garibaldi		Merchant Navy		
Salpi	1920	Merchant Navy	2,710	

=== Regia Marina ===
Battleships and cruisers
Ship	Flag	Type	Notes
La Spezia
Andrea Doria	Kingdom of Italy	Littorio-class battleship	
Giulio Cesare	Kingdom of Italy	Conte di Cavour-class battleship	
Vittorio Veneto	Kingdom of Italy	Littorio-class battleship	
X Destroyer Squadron
Maestrale	Kingdom of Italy	Maestrale-class destroyer	Flag
Libeccio	Kingdom of Italy	Maestrale-class destroyer	
Grecale	Kingdom of Italy	Maestrale-class destroyer	
Scirocco	Kingdom of Italy	Maestrale-class destroyer	
XIII Destroyer Squadron
Granatiere	Kingdom of Italy	Soldati-class destroyer	Flag
Fuciliere	Kingdom of Italy	Soldati-class destroyer	
Alpino	Kingdom of Italy	Soldati-class destroyer	
Messina
Bolzano	Kingdom of Italy	Trento-class cruiser	
Trento	Kingdom of Italy	Trento-class cruiser	
Trieste	Kingdom of Italy	Trento-class cruiser	
XI Destroyer Squadron
Corazziere	Kingdom of Italy	Soldato-class destroyer	Flag
Camicia Nera	Kingdom of Italy	Soldato-class destroyer	
Carabiniere	Kingdom of Italy	Soldato-class destroyer	

=== Air activity ===
Aircraft near Force H on 9 February
Time	Type	Notes
9:34 a.m.	—	Radar contact 060° 27 nmi (50 km; 31 mi) 2 aircraft
9:44 a.m.	—	Spotted to NNE, no contact
10:47 a.m.	CANT Z.506B	Radar contact, 070° 40 nmi (74 km; 46 mi) shot down
11:20 a.m.	Fiat BR.20	Radar contact 350° 30 nmi (56 km; 35 mi) 2 bombed from 12,000 ft (3,700 m)
12;10 a.m.	Formation	Radar contact 160°
1:25 p.m.	CANT Z.1007B	Shadower, shot down
2:12 p.m.	Formations	Passing to NE
3:00 p.m.	Shadower	Escaped in cloud
4:51–5:00 p.m.	—	Radar contacts

== Bibliography ==
- Artieri, Giovanni (1978). Cronaca del Regno d'Italia: Dalla Vittoria alla Repubblica [Chronicles of the Kingdom of Italy: From Victory to the Republic]. Le scie (in Italian). Vol. II. Milano: Mondadori. OCLC 848126253.
- Bagnasco, Ermingo (2011). The Littorio Class: Italy's Last and Largest Battleships. Barnsley: Seaforth Publishing. ISBN 978-1-84832-105-2.
- Bagnasco, Erminio; De Toro, Augusto (2008). Le navi da battaglia della classe "Littorio" 1937–1948. Parma: Ermanno Albertelli Editore. ISBN 88-87372-66-7.
- Dannreuther, Raymond (2009). Somerville's Force H: The Royal Navy's Gibraltar-based Fleet, June 1940 to March 1942 (repr. ed.). London: Aurum Press. ISBN 1-84513-020-0.
- Faggioni, Gabriele (2010). Il Vallo ligure. La linea difensiva allestita dalle forze nazifasciste. Genova: Ligurpress. ISBN 978-88-6406-037-8.
- Giorgerini, Giorgio (2001). La guerra italiana sul mare. La Marina tra vittoria e sconfitta 1940–1943 [The Italian War at Sea: The Navy between Victory and Defeat 1940–1943] (in Italian). Milano: Mondadori. ISBN 978-8-80-440581-8.
- Greene, Jack; Massignani, Alessandro (2002). The Naval War in the Mediterranean, 1940–1943 (repr. pbk. ed.). London: Chatham. ISBN 1-86176-190-2.
- Jordan, Roger W. (2006) [1999]. The World's Merchant Fleets 1939: The Particulars and Wartime Fates of 6,000 Ships (2nd ed.). London: Chatham/Lionel Leventhal. ISBN 978-1-86176-293-1.
- O'Hara, Vincent P. (2009). Struggle for the Middle Sea: The Great Navies at War in the Mediterranean Theater, 1940–1945. London: Conway. ISBN 978-1-84486-102-6.
- Playfair, I. S. O.; et al. (1957) [1954]. Butler, J. R. M. (ed.). The Mediterranean and Middle East: The Early Successes Against Italy (to May 1941) (online scan). History of the Second World War, United Kingdom Military Series. Vol. I (4th ed.). HMSO. OCLC 494123451 – via Archive Foundation.
- Rohwer, Jürgen; Hümmelchen, Gerhard (2005). Chronology of the War at Sea 1939–1945: The Naval History of World War Two (3rd rev. ed.). Annapolis, Maryland: Naval Institute Press. ISBN 1-59114-119-2.
- Selected Bombardments (Mediterranean), 1940–1941 (Battle Summaries Nos. 1, 6, 7 & 19. Naval Staff Monographs. London: Historical Section Admiralty. 1954. OCLC 228509295. BR 1736 (38) – via Archive Foundation.
- Roskill, S. W. (1959) [1954]. Butler, J. R. M. (ed.). The War at Sea 1939–1945: The Defensive (online scan). History of the Second World War United Kingdom Military Series. Vol. I (4th impr. ed.). London: HMSO. OCLC 881709135 – via Archive Foundation.
- Shores, Christopher; Cull, Brian; Malizia, Nicola (1987). Malta the Hurricane Years 1940−1941. London: Grub Street. ISBN 0-948817-06-2.
- Titterton, G. A. (2011) [2002]. The Royal Navy and the Mediterranean: September 1939 – October 1940. Naval Staff Histories. Vol. I. London: Routledge. ISBN 978-0-7146-5179-8. BR 1736 (11). Published anonymously in 1952 as a restricted document "Selected Convoys (Mediterranean), 1941–1942 Battle Summaries Nos. 18 and 32" by the Admiralty Historical Section.
