= HMS Malaya =

1915 Queen Elizabeth-class battleship of the Royal Navy

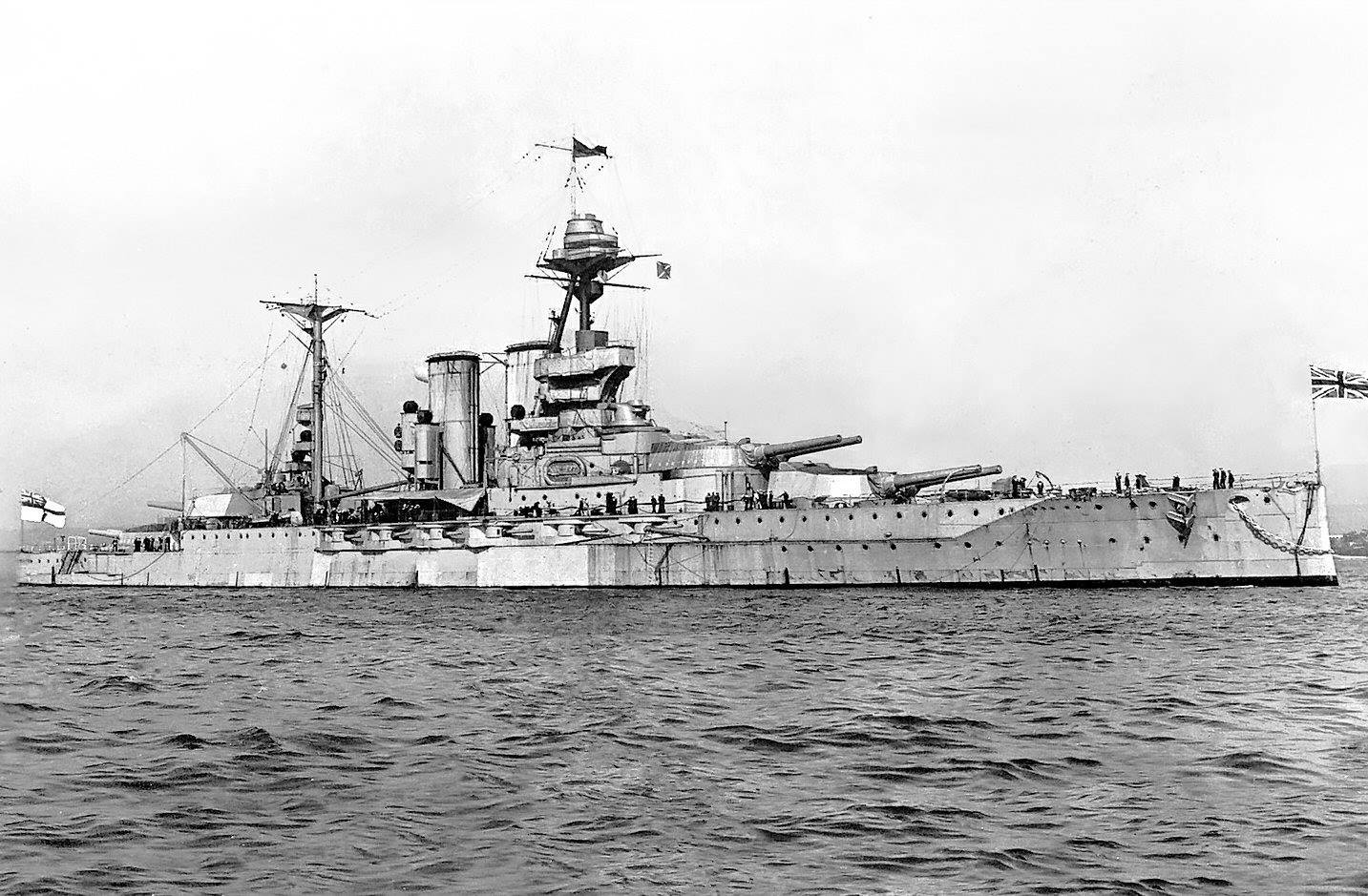
- Malaya about 1919–1921

History

United Kingdom
- Name: Malaya
- Namesake: Federated Malay States
- Ordered: 1913
- Builder: Armstrong Whitworth, South Tyneside
- Cost: £2,945,709
- Laid down: 20 October 1913
- Launched: 18 March 1915
- Commissioned: 1 February 1916
- Decommissioned: 1 December 1944
- Stricken: 12 April 1948
- Identification: Pennant number: 3A (1914); 84 (Jan 18); 06 (Apr 18); 01 (Nov 19)
- Motto: Malem Fero Malis ("I bring evil to the evil")
- Fate: Sold for scrap, 20 February 1948

General characteristics (as built)
- Class & type: Queen Elizabeth-class battleship
- Displacement: 32,590 long tons (33,113 t); 33,260 long tons (33,794 t) (Deep load)
- Length: 639 ft 9 in (195 m)
- Beam: 90 ft 7 in (27.6 m)
- Draught: 33 ft (10.1 m)
- Installed power: 24 Babcock & Wilcox boilers; 75,000 shp (56,000 kW)
- Propulsion: 4 shafts; 2 steam turbine sets
- Speed: 24 knots (44 km/h; 28 mph)
- Range: 5,000 nmi (9,300 km; 5,800 mi) at 12 knots (22 km/h; 14 mph)
- Complement: 1,217 (1919)
- Armament: 4 × twin 15 in (381 mm) guns; 14 × single 6 in (152 mm) guns; 2 × single 3 in (76 mm) AA guns; 4 × 21 in (533 mm) torpedo tubes
- Armour: Waterline belt: 13 in (330 mm); Deck: 1–3 in (25–76 mm); Barbettes: 7–10 in (178–254 mm); Gun turrets: 11–13 in (279–330 mm); Conning tower: 13 in (330 mm)

HMS Malaya was one of five Queen Elizabeth-class dreadnought battleships built for the Royal Navy during the 1910s. Shortly after commissioning in early 1916, she participated in the Battle of Jutland of the First World War as part of the Grand Fleet.

Malaya spent the interwar period between the Mediterranean Fleet, Atlantic Fleet, and Home Fleet. She transported Ottoman Sultan Mehmed VI into exile and served during the 1936-1939 Arab revolt in Palestine. Apart from this, her interwar career was uneventful.

With the outbreak of the Second World War, Malaya served with the Mediterranean Fleet, serving as a convoy escort and fighting in the Battle of Calabria and Operation Grog. In March 1941, she was transferred to the North Atlantic to perform convoy escort duties, during which she prevented the German battleships Scharnhorst and Gneisenau from attacking a convoy. Torpedoed in that month by the German submarine U-106, Malaya received repairs in New York. Malaya was withdrawn from service at the end of 1944 and used as an accommodation ship for the training establishment HMS Vernon. She was ultimately broken up and sold for scrap in 1948.

== Design and description ==
The Queen Elizabeth-class battleships were designed to form a fast squadron for the fleet that was intended to operate against the leading ships of the opposing battleline and prevent German battlecruisers from doing the same. This required maximum offensive power and a speed several knots faster than any other battleship to allow them to defeat any type of ship. As a result, the breech-loading (BL) 15-inch (381mm) Mk 1 gun was adopted, a significant upgrade from the 13.5-inch Mk V gun found on the preceding Iron Duke-class. A last-minute decision by the Admiralty led to the use of oil-fired boilers, increasing the speed of the ships.

Malaya had a length overall of 639 feet 9 inches (195 m), a beam of 90 feet 7 inches (27.6 m) and a deep draught of 33 feet (10.1 m). She had a normal displacement of 32,590 long tons (33,113 t) and displaced 33,260 long tons (33,794 t) at deep load. She was powered by two sets of Parsons steam turbines, rated at 75,000 shaft horsepower (56,000 kW) and driving two shafts using steam from 24 Babcock & Wilcox boilers. Though the turbines were intended to reach a maximum speed of 25 knots (46.3 km/h; 28.8 mph), in practice, 23–24 knots (42.6–44.4 km/h; 26.5–27.6 mph) was the fastest achievable. The ship had a range of 5,000 nautical miles (9,260 km; 5,754 mi) at a cruising speed of 12 knots (22.2 km/h; 13.8 mph). Her crew numbered 1,217 officers and ratings in 1919.

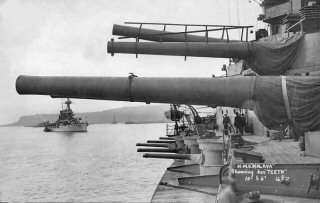
15-inch guns of 'A' and 'B' turrets trained to starboard, 6-inch guns in casemates below, c. 1920

The Queen Elizabeth class was equipped with eight breech-loading (BL) 15-inch (381 mm) Mk I guns in four twin-gun turrets, in two superfiring pairs fore and aft of the superstructure, designated 'A', 'B', 'X', and 'Y' from front to rear. Twelve of the fourteen BL 6-inch (152 mm) Mk XII guns were mounted in casemates along the broadside of the vessel amidships; the remaining pair were mounted on the forecastle deck near the aft funnel and were protected by gun shields. The anti-aircraft (AA) armament were composed of two quick-firing (QF) 3-inch (76 mm) 20 cwt Mk I (Note: "Cwt" is the abbreviation for hundredweight, 20 cwt referring to the weight of the gun.) guns. The ships were fitted with four submerged 21-inch (533 mm) torpedo tubes, two on each broadside.

Malaya was completed with two fire-control directors fitted with 15-foot (4.6 m) rangefinders. One was mounted above the conning tower, protected by an armoured hood, and the other was in the spotting top above the tripod foremast. Each turret was also fitted with a 15-foot rangefinder. The main armament could be controlled by 'B' turret as well. The secondary armament was primarily controlled by directors mounted on each side of the compass platform on the foremast once they were fitted in April 1917.

The waterline belt of the Queen Elizabeth class consisted of Krupp cemented armour (KC) that was 13 inches (330 mm) thick over the ships' vitals. The gun turrets were protected by 11 to 13 inches (279 to 330 mm) of KC armour and were supported by barbettes 7–10 inches (178–254 mm) thick. The ships had multiple armoured decks that ranged from 1 to 3 inches (25 to 76 mm) in thickness. The main conning tower was protected by 13 inches of armour. After the Battle of Jutland, 1 inch of high-tensile steel was added to the main deck over the magazines and additional anti-flash equipment was added in the magazines.

The ship was fitted with flying-off platforms mounted on the roofs of 'B' and 'X' turrets in 1918, from which fighters and reconnaissance aircraft could launch. Exactly when the platforms were removed is unknown, but no later than Malaya's 1934–1936 reconstruction.

=== 1924 refit ===
During her first post-war refit in 1924, Malaya saw the removal of her 3-inch guns and main mast searchlight platforms and addition of 4-inch high-angle guns. A refit in 1926 added another pair of 4-inch guns, the HACS anti-aircraft fire control system, a new fore-top, a stump fore-topmast, and moved the 15-inch gunnery director. A short-range wireless-transmitter was added either during this refit or earlier.

During her first big refit from 1927–1929, Malaya received modified anti-torpedo bulges, collective protection, and water protection. A torpedo-control position and an HACS Mk I director were added. She received new storage facilities for aviation fuel, and improved storage for 6-inch ammunition. The ship's bridgework was modified, its stump fore-mast removed, and its funnels were amalgamated or "trunked". These modifications led her to share a similar appearance with HMS Warspite. The two stern submerged torpedo tubes were removed in 1931.

Malaya underwent a more extensive refit from 1934–1936. Armour protection over her deck, magazines, and machinery spaces was improved, and the armoured conning-tower was replaced by a smaller one. The 4-inch high-angle guns were replaced by four twin mounts for 4-inch Mk XIX guns and two 2-pounder (40 mm (1.6 in) Mk VIII "pom-pom" mounts and four Vickers 0.5 in (12.7 mm) AA machine-guns were added. The installation of the pom-pom director led the 6-inch director to be moved. The bow torpedo tubes were removed, and an aircraft catapult and aircraft hangar were fitted. A run after this refit achieved Malaya's top speed of 23.7 knots (43.9 km/h; 27.3 mph).

After being torpedoed by U-106 in March 1941, a damage refit in Brooklyn Naval Yard added offices and mounting positions for a pair of Type 281 early-warning radars, a pair of Type 285 anti-aircraft radars, a Type 284 range-finding radar, and several Type 282 pom-pom directors. The radars were added in a July 1941 refit in the United Kingdom, which also removed the 0.5-inch machine-gun mountings and added eleven 20-mm Oerlikon anti-aircraft cannon.

A 1942 refit removed the aircraft catapult and added a pair of twin 4-inch guns, a pair of 20 mm Oerlikons, and a pair of eight-barrelled pom-pom mounts, as well as a Type 273 surface search radar. To save space for the equipment added as well as the personnel required to man them, Malaya's 6-inch guns were removed in 1943 and plated over, with twenty-two more 20-mm Oerlikons added. A final refit in 1944 added eight 20 mm Oerlikons, upgraded the radars, and added a Type 650 missile-jamming device.

== Construction and career ==
=== First World War ===
Malaya was built by Sir W. G. Armstrong Whitworth and Company at High Walker, Newcastle upon Tyne, and launched in March 1915. She was named in honour of the Federated Malay States in Malaya, whose government paid for her construction.

Malaya served in Rear-Admiral Hugh Evan-Thomas's 5th Battle Squadron of the Grand Fleet. She took part in the Battle of Jutland, on 31 May 1916. She first engaged the German battlecruisers and targeted the battlecruiser SMS Seydlitz, scoring numerous hits with her 15-inch (381 mm) main guns. As the German battleline intercepted the 5th Battle Squadron, Malaya was hit by seven 12-inch (305 mm) shells from multiple German battleships. As 5th Battle Squadron retreated to join the rest of the Grand Fleet, she was hit by an additional battleship sized projectile for a total of eight hits, taking major damage and heavy crew casualties. A total of 65 men died, either in the battle or later due to their injuries. However, her armour held up, surviving nowhere near critical condition. Among the wounded was Able Seaman Willie Vicarage, notable as one of the first men to receive facial reconstruction using plastic surgery and the first to receive radical reconstruction via the "tubed pedicule" technique pioneered by Sir Harold Gillies. Uniquely among the ships at the battle, HMS Malaya flew the red-white-black-yellow ensign of the Federated Malay States.

Other than Jutland, and the inconclusive Action of 19 August, her service during the First World War mostly consisted of routine patrols and training in the North Sea.

=== Between the wars ===
On 17 November 1922 Malaya carried the last Sultan of the Ottoman Empire, Mehmed VI, from Istanbul into exile on Malta. In August–September 1938 she served in the port of Haifa during the 1936–39 Arab revolt in Palestine.

=== Second World War ===
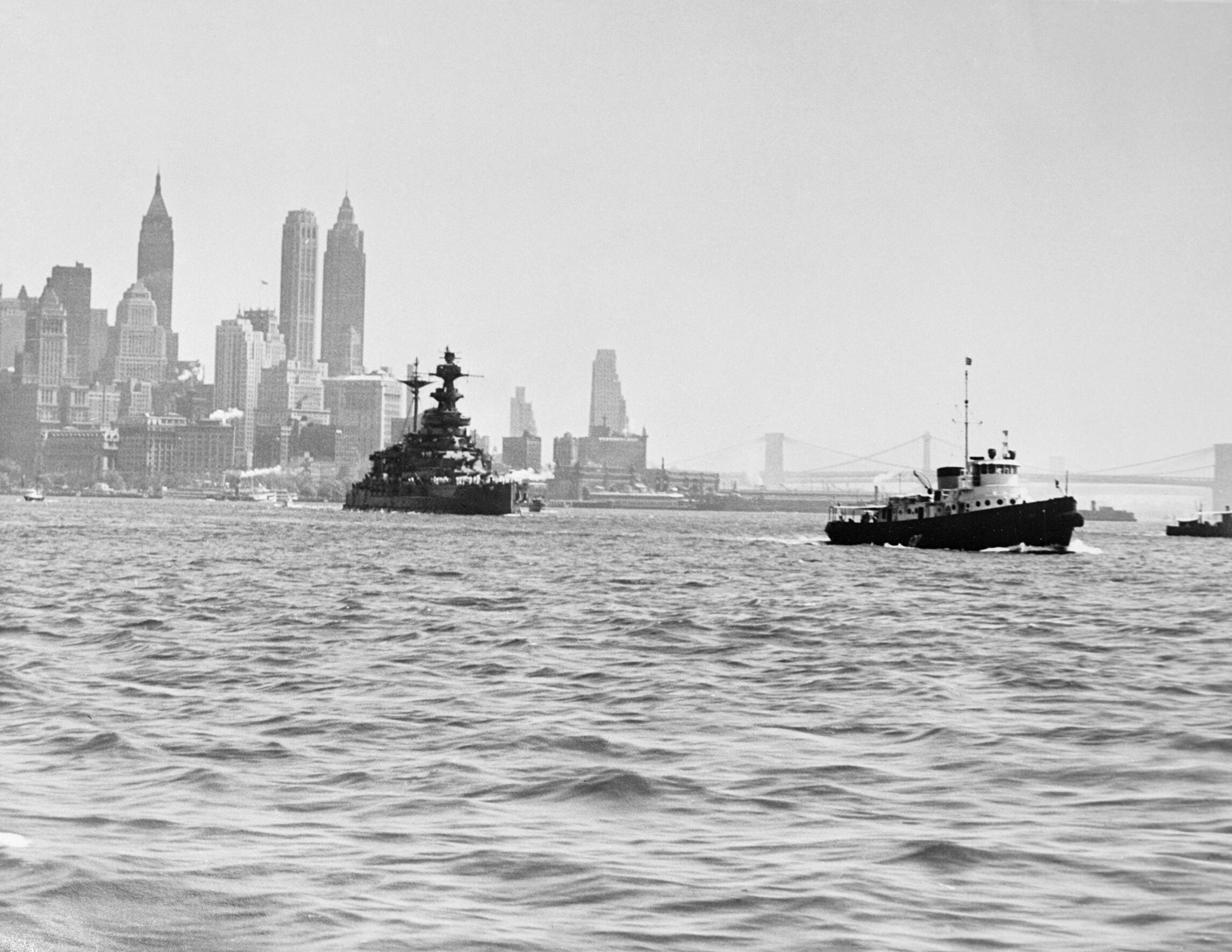
Malaya departing New York after repairs, 9 July 1941

Malaya served in the Mediterranean in 1940, escorting convoys and operating against the Italian fleet. Malaya's second big action of her career, and her first of World War II, was the Battle of Calabria, on 9 June 1940. British forces engaged an Italian fleet, including the battleships Conte di Cavour and Giulio Cesare. Malaya fired several main battery rounds against the Italians while under fire from Conte di Cavour. Through her actions, Malaya helped to chase off the Italian warships with no damage received or hits scored, though most of the engagement was carried out by Warspite.

She shelled Genoa in February 1941 as part of Operation Grog but due to a crew error, fired a 15-inch armour-piercing shell into the south-east corner of the nave of Genoa Cathedral, that failed to detonate.

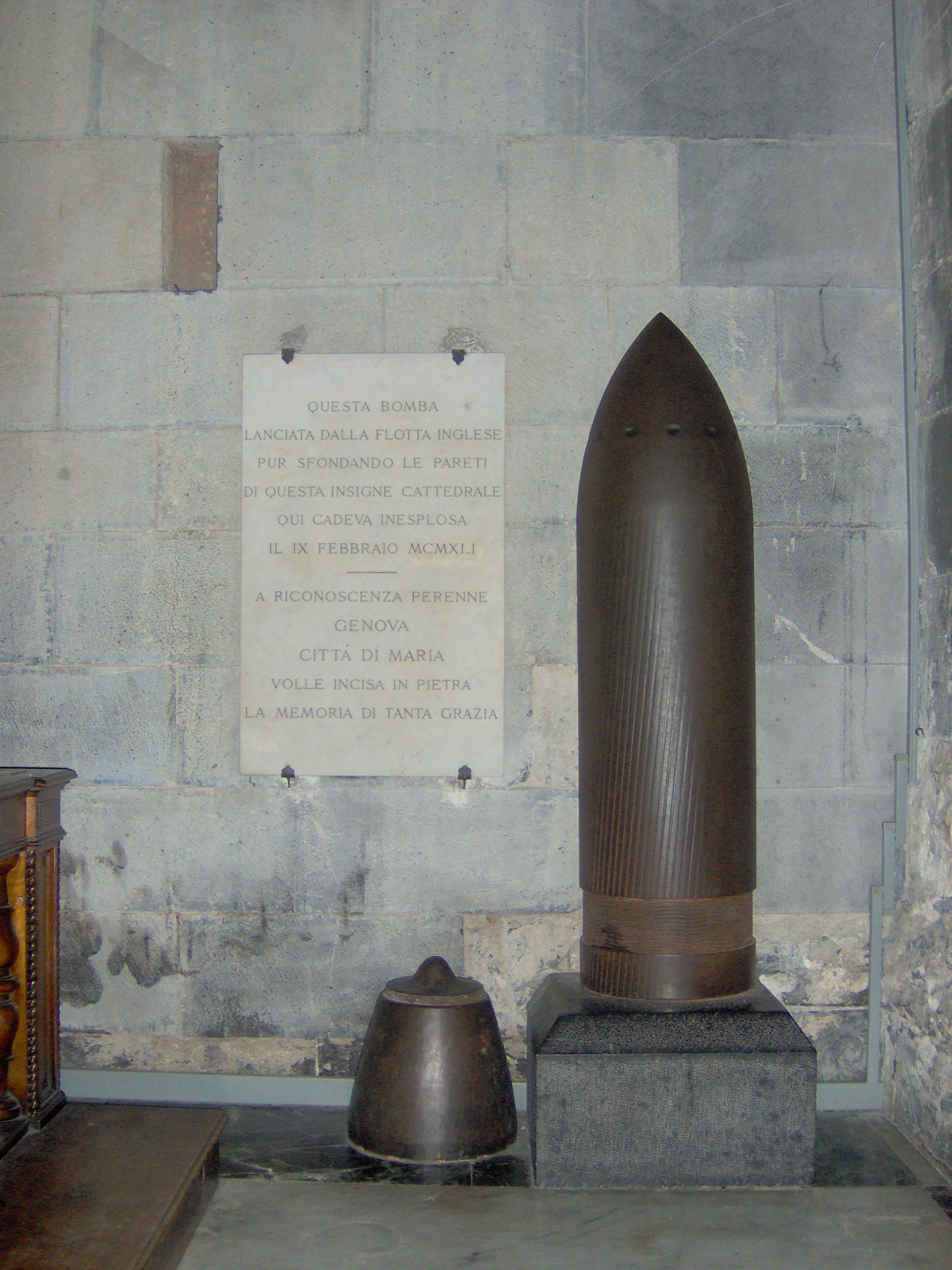
Armour-piercing shell – with cap (left) fired on 9 February 1941 into the nave of Genoa Cathedral

In March 1941, she was transferred to the North Atlantic for convoy escort. On 7 March 1941, while escorting Convoy SL 67, Malaya encountered the German capital ships Scharnhorst and Gneisenau that were conducting the Operation Berlin raid against Allied convoys. By her presence she forced them to withdraw, although a U-boat attack aiming to sink Malaya inflicted some damage on the convoy.

Later that month Malaya was escorting Convoy SL 68. On the evening of 20 March 1941, about 250 nmi (460 km; 290 mi) west-northwest of the Cape Verde Islands, Malaya was hit by a torpedo from U-106. Damaged on the port side, and with a 7 degree list due to flooding, Malaya was forced to leave the convoy and make for port, escorted by the corvette Crocus. She reached Trinidad safely on 29 March. After temporary repairs, she continued to the New York Navy Yard, where she was docked for four months. During that time, personnel from the ship ferried ten Banff-class sloops to Britain.

On 9 July, under the command of Captain Cuthbert Coppinger, Malaya left New York on trials and steamed to Halifax, Nova Scotia, to provide protection for an urgent fast convoy. No ships were lost and Malaya arrived in Rosyth on 28 July. Thereafter she escorted convoys from the United Kingdom to Malta and Cape Town until summer 1943.

Malaya was placed in reserve at the end of 1943. At this time her secondary 6-inch armament was removed and her anti-aircraft armament was enhanced. Between 15 and 17 May 1944, Malaya was used in Loch Striven as a target ship for inert Highball bouncing bomb prototypes, one of which punched a hole in the ship's side. She was reactivated just before the Normandy landings to act as a reserve bombardment battleship.

=== Fate ===
Malaya was withdrawn from service at the end of 1944 and became an accommodation ship for a torpedo school. Sold on 20 February 1948 to Metal Industries, Limited she arrived at Faslane on 12 April 1948 for scrapping. The first watch bell was refitted and presented to the Perak Council in Malaya, and was hung in the Council Chamber. The furthermost bell is located in the East India Club, and the second watch bell was handed to the Victoria Institution on 12 September 1947, before being handed over to the Royal Malaysian Navy in 2007.
