= Taylor Penny =

Royal Navy officer (1721–1786)

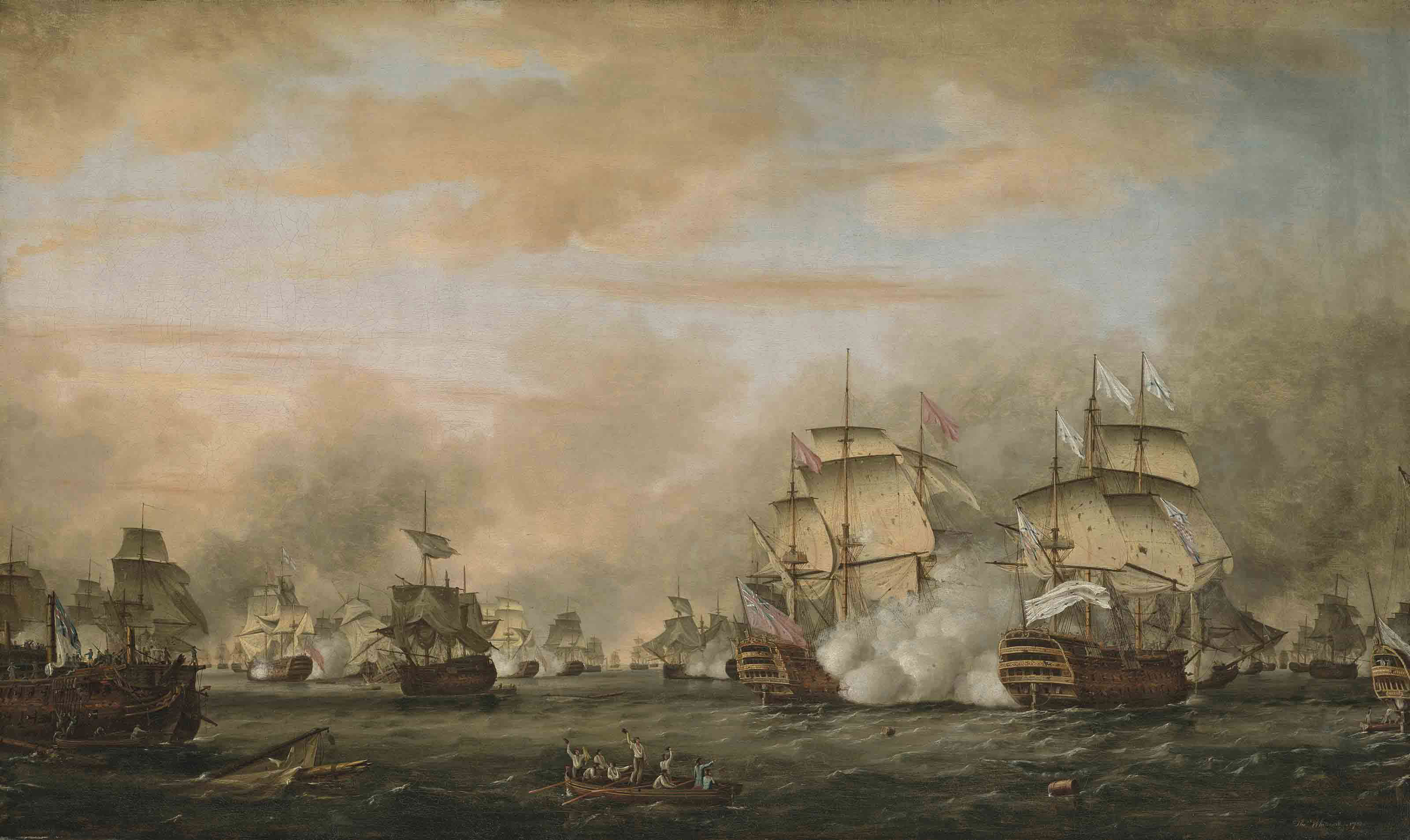
The Battle of the Saintes

Captain Taylor Penny (1721 – 18 April 1786) was a Royal Navy officer who fought in the Battle of the Saintes.

== Life ==
He was born in Weymouth in Dorset in 1721, probably into a seafaring family.

He was commissioned as a lieutenant in the Royal Navy on 6 August 1745. In 1755 he joined the newly converted HMS Firebrand and on 31 December of that year was promoted to commander.

In November 1757 he transferred to be captain of the newly completed HMS Aldborough. He was mainly employed on convoy duty. In 1760 he transferred to the newly completed 44-gun HMS Looe. On this ship he captured the Jupiter in June 1762. Soon after he captured a small Spanish privateer, Maria, and the 4-gun Joseph, which he took to Cork in Ireland. Both these actions were during the Seven Years' War.

From 1762 to 1777 he had no active commissions (and possibly had a family life in Dorset during this period).

In June 1778 he was appointed commander of the 70-gun HMS Burford, one of the largest ships in the Royal Navy at the time. He was replaced by Captain Peter Rainier in October of that year. He was then given a more permanent position as captain and commander of HMS Marlborough in June 1779. On this ship he took part in the Channel Fleet retreat and the Moonlight Battle off Cape St. Vincent on 16 January 1780. Under Admiral Robert Digby in February 1780 he captured the French ship Protee which was then recommissioned in the Royal Navy as HMS Prothee.

In the campaign of June to December 1780, still under Admiral Digby, alongside Captain Richard Onslow on HMS Bellona they captured the 54-gun Dutch ship Princess Carolina (on 30 December).

On 12 April 1781 he aided the relief of Gibraltar. Later in 1781 he sailed to the Leeward Islands to join Admiral George Rodney's fleet patrolling the West Indies.

On 12 April 1782 he headed the attack on the French fleet as part of the Battle of the Saintes. She approached to stand 150m from the French line. Following this action he attached to Admiral Hugh Pigot's fleet which went to North America, patrolling the seas off Boston.

Both Penny and the Marlborough were paid off by the Royal Navy in July 1783.

Penny then returned to his home town of Weymouth where he served as mayor 1785/6.

He died on 18 April 1786 in Wyke Regis aged 64 and was buried in All Saints churchyard there on 19 April 1782.

== Family ==
Penny was married and his wife outlived him.

They did not have children. However he took a young Weymouth man, Joseph Spear, his aid in receiving a commission into the navy in 1779. Spear had a very illustrious career.

His great nephew Major General Nicholas Penny was killed in action at Kukerowlee in April 1858 during the Indian mutiny.
