= French ship Jupiter =

Six ships of the French Navy and at least one privateer have borne the name Jupiter:

- Jupiter (1647), a 50-gun ship of the line
- A 22-gun privateer captured by Captain Taylor Penny in 1762
- Jupiter (1789), a 74-gun Téméraire-class ship of the line
- Jupiter (1803), a 74-gun Téméraire-class ship of the line, launched as Viala in 1795 renamed Voltaire and then Constitution later that year finally renamed Jupiter in 1803
- Jupiter (1824), a brig
- Jupiter (1831), an 80-gun Bucentaure-class ship of the line
- Impérial (1856), a 90-gun Algésiras-class steam ship of the line, renamed Jupiter in 1870

== See also ==
- HMS Jupiter
