= HMS Jupiter =

Six ships of the Royal Navy have been named HMS Jupiter, after the Roman god Jupiter.

- HMS Jupiter (1778) was a 50-gun fourth rate launched in 1774 and wrecked in 1808.
- HMS Jupiter (1813) was a 50-gun fourth rate launched in 1813. She was used as a troopship from 1837 and a coal hulk from 1846. She was broken up in 1870.
- HMS Jupiter was a coal hulk, originally launched in 1833 as the 44-gun fifth rate HMS Forth. She was renamed Jupiter in 1869 and was sold in 1883.
- HMS Jupiter (1895) was a Majestic-class battleship launched in 1895 and scrapped in 1920.
- HMS Jupiter (F85) was a J-class destroyer launched in 1938 and sunk by a mine in 1942.
- HMS Jupiter (F60) was a Leander-class frigate launched in 1967 and sold for scrapping in 1997.

== See also ==
- French ship Jupiter
