= Monte Penello =

Mountain in Italy

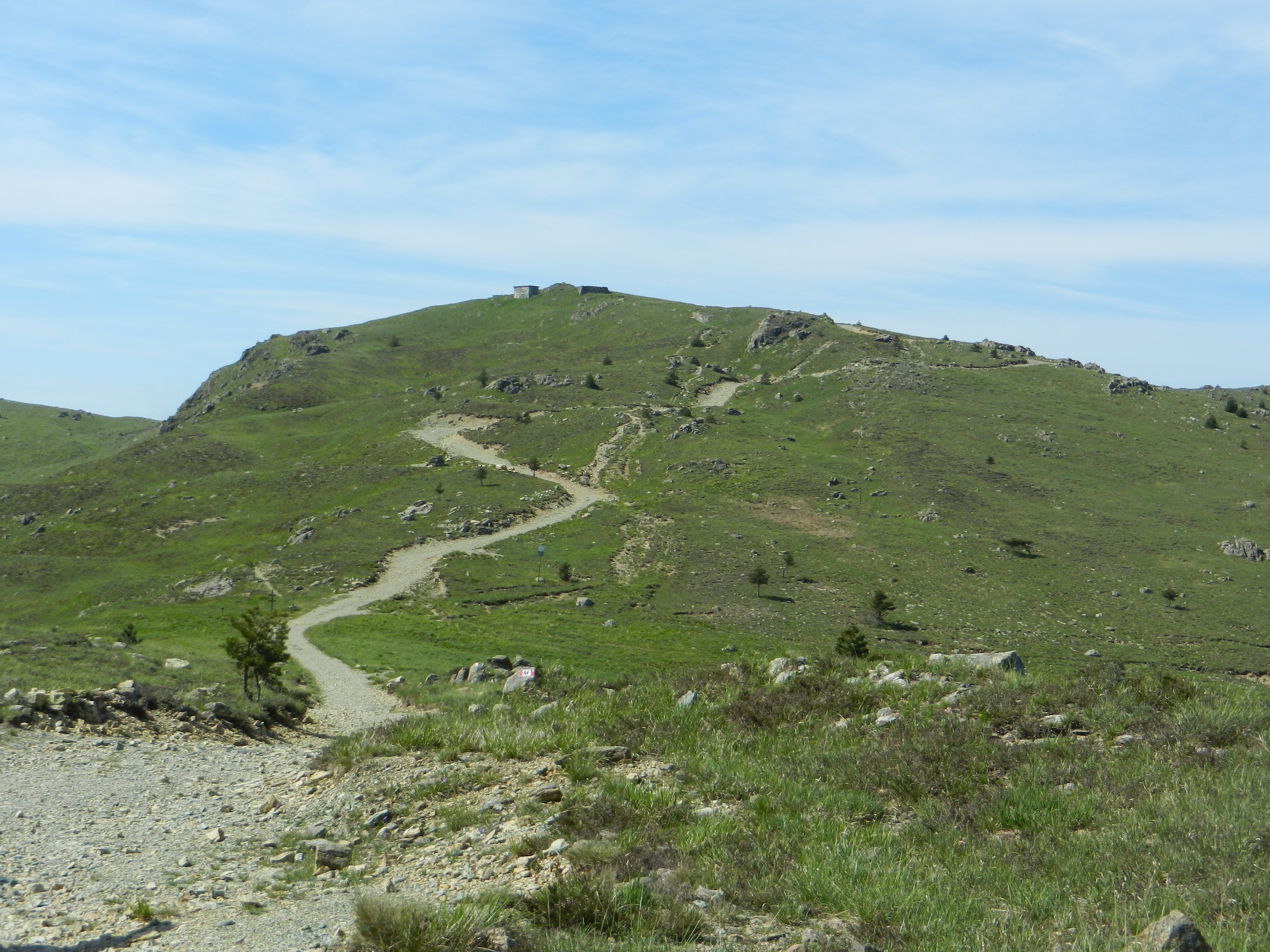

Highest point
- Elevation: 995 m (3,264 ft)
- Coordinates: 44°28′50″N 8°48′00″E

Geography
- Location within Italy
- Location: Liguria, Italy
- Parent range: Ligurian Apennines

Monte Penello is a mountain in Liguria, northern Italy, part of the Ligurian Apennines. It is located in the province of Genoa. It lies at an altitude of 995 metres.

== Hiking ==
The summit can be reached from the Alta Via dei Monti Liguri following a brief connection footpath.

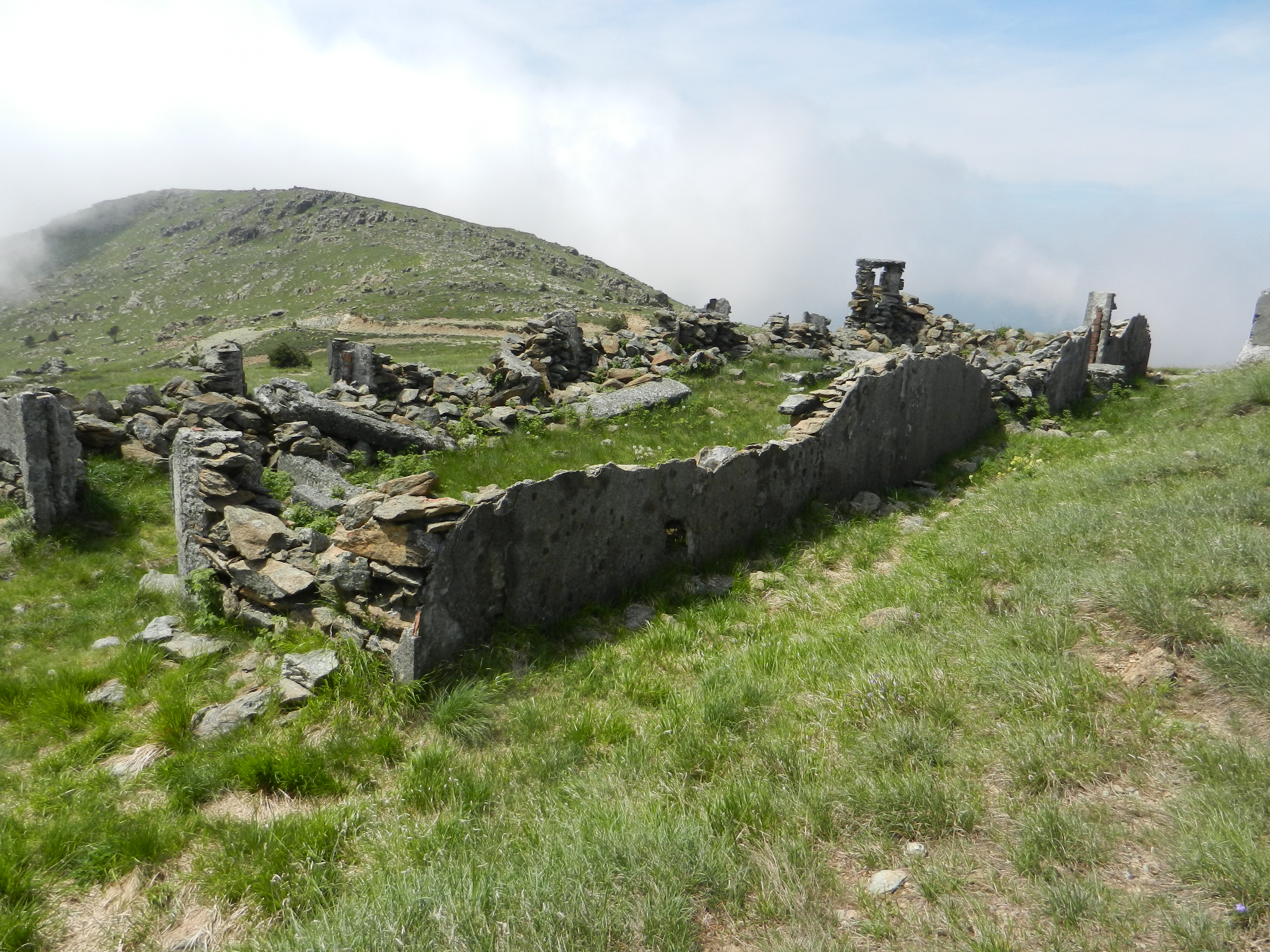
Second WW remains near the summit

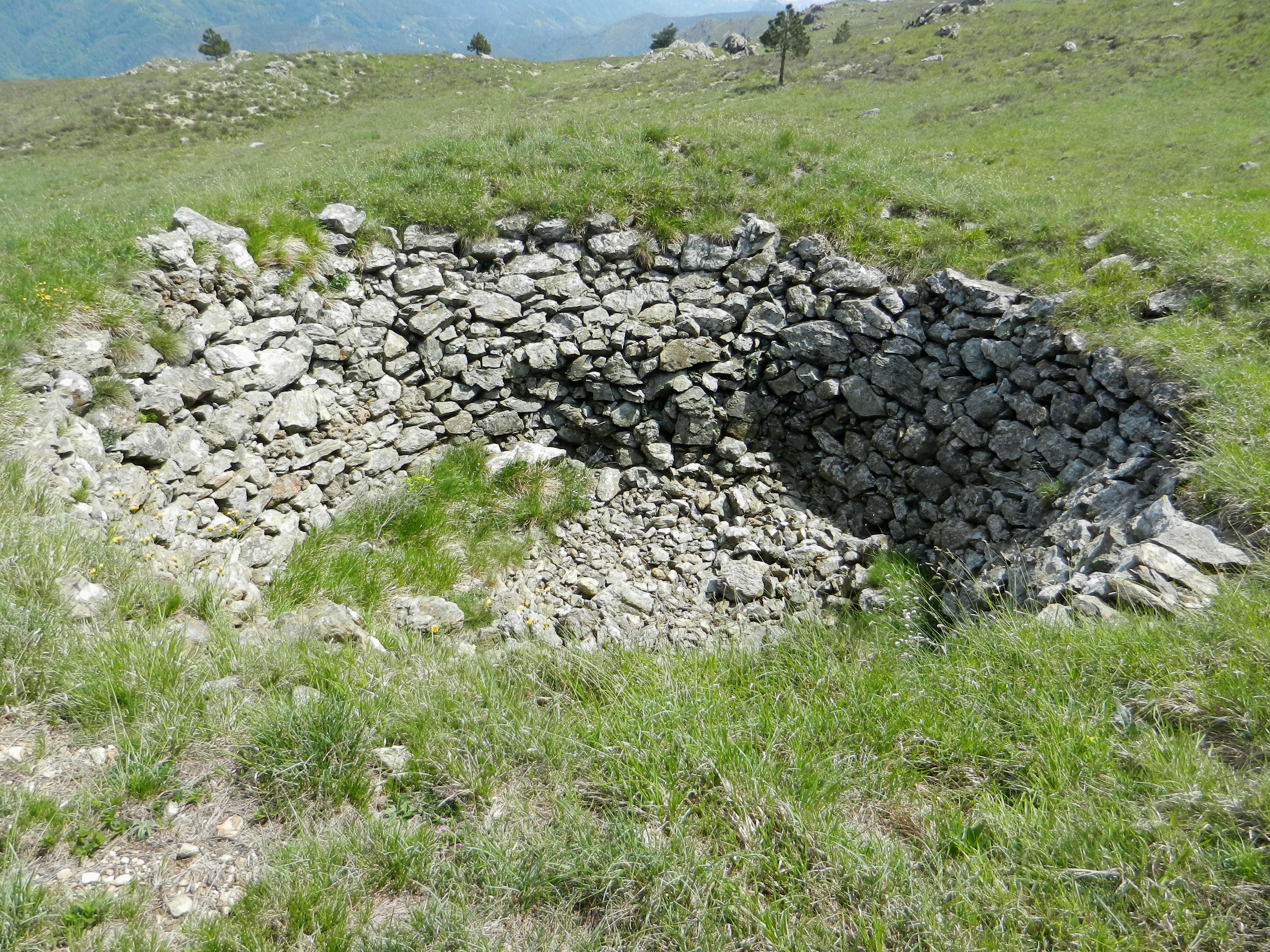
Ancient tank aimed to preserve winter snow for spring and summer
