= Slamat disaster =

- Location: 37°01′N 23°10′E
- Date: April 27, 1941; 85 years ago
- Target: The troopship Slamat and destroyers HMS Diamond and HMS Wryneck
- Attack type: Air attack on ships
- Weapon: Junkers Ju 87 dive bombers
- Deaths: 983
- Perpetrator: Luftwaffe

Locations involved in the disaster

The Slamat disaster is a succession of three related shipwrecks during the Battle of Greece on 27 April 1941. The Dutch troopship Slamat and the Royal Navy destroyers HMS Diamond and HMS Wryneck sank as a result of air attacks by Luftwaffe Junkers Ju 87 dive bombers. The three ships sank off the east coast of the Peloponnese during Operation Demon, which was the evacuation of British, Australian and New Zealand troops from Greece after their defeat by invading German and Italian forces.

The loss of the three ships caused an estimated 983 deaths. Only 66 men survived.

== Operation Demon ==
On 6 April 1941 Germany and Italy invaded Yugoslavia and Greece. An expeditionary force of British, Australian and New Zealand troops was already in Greece, but they and Greek defenders lost ground to the invaders and by 17 April the British Empire was starting to plan the evacuation of 60,000 troops.

Slamat was a 11,406 GRT Dutch troop ship, converted from a Koninklijke Rotterdamsche Lloyd ("Royal Dutch Lloyd") ocean liner. Since October 1940 she had been operating in the Indian Ocean, but in April 1941 she was ordered through the Suez Canal to the Mediterranean Sea to join Operation Demon.

== Convoy AG 14 ==
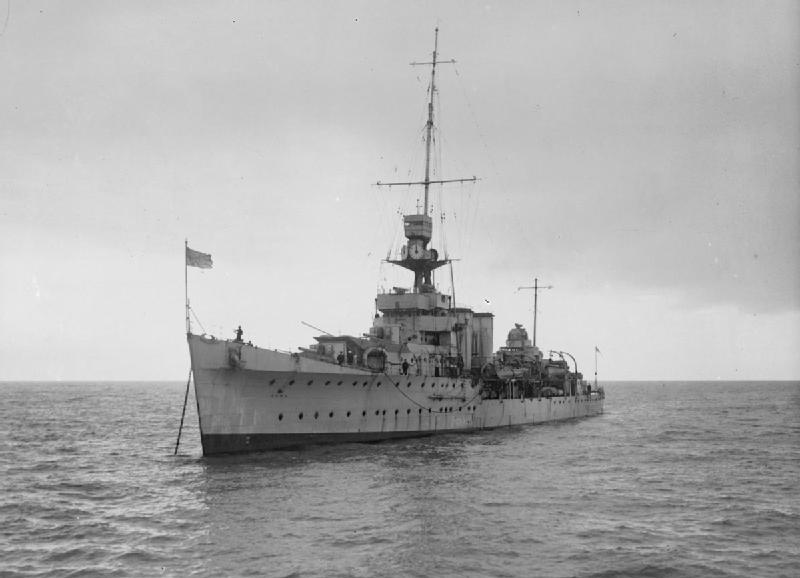
HMS Calcutta led the evacuation flotilla from Nauplia and carried 960 British, Australian and New Zealand troops

Slamat was in the Mediterranean by 23 April, and on the 24th she was one of six merchant ships that left Alexandria with Convoy AG 14 for Greece. British, Australian and New Zealand forces were spread over much of Greece, so on 26 April when AG 14 reached Greek waters, it split to reach different embarkation points. Slamat and a smaller troop ship, the 7,513 GRT Khedive Ismail managed by British-India Line, were ordered with the cruiser HMS Calcutta and a number of destroyers to Nauplia and Tolon on the Argolic Gulf in the eastern Peloponnese. The corvette HMS Salvia swept Nauplia Bay for mines before the ships arrived.

Luftwaffe air reconnaissance found AG 14 at noon on 26 April. The invaders had air superiority, and Royal Air Force capacity to resist was being reduced daily. On 24 April the Belfast Steamship Company troop ship Ulster Prince had grounded in the fairway in Nauplia Bay, blocking ship access to the port. The next day an air attack turned the grounded ship into a total loss. Ships would now have to anchor in the bay and tenders would be needed to bring troops and equipment out to them from the shore, so the landing ship, infantry Glenearn (a converted Glen Line merchant ship) was sent to deliver several Landing Craft Assault to Nauplia. However, on 26 April a Junkers Ju 87 Stuka attack disabled Glenearn, so she put her LCAs ashore for use at Monemvasia and was towed to Souda Bay. En route to Nauplia the convoy was attacked by aircraft and a number of bombs hit Slamat, causing heavy damage on B and C decks, destroying two of her lifeboats and wounding one crewman. The Germans recognised that the ships would embark troops overnight and leave early the next morning (27 April), so General der Flieger Wolfram Freiherr von Richthofen, commander of the VIII. Fliegerkorps, planned to attack the ships as they left their various embarkation points.

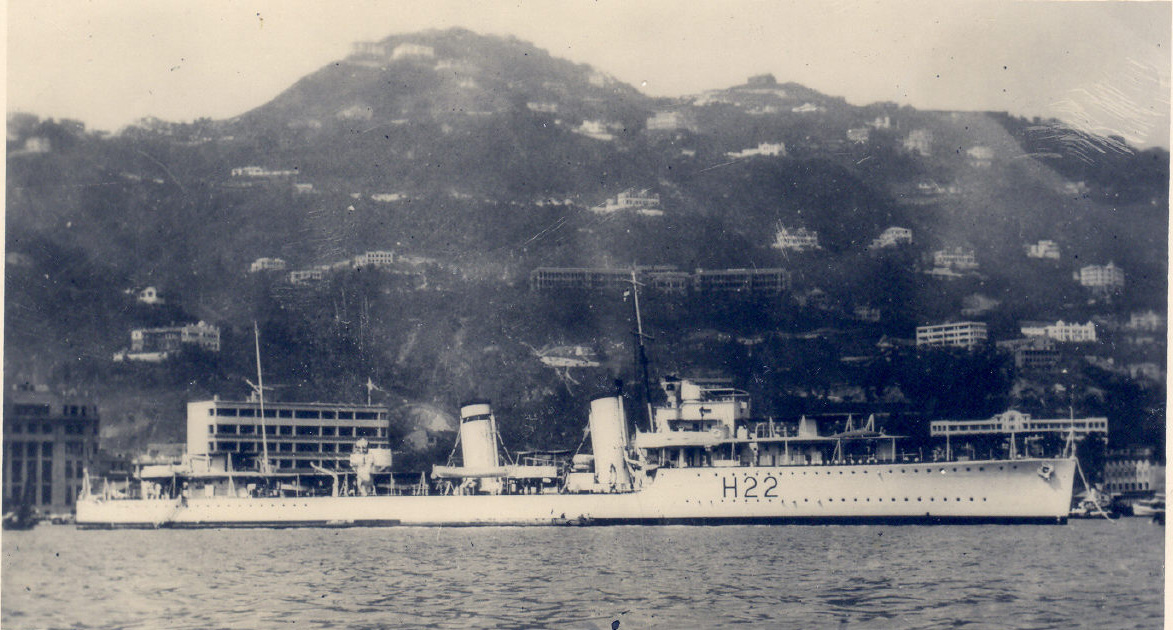
HMS Diamond patrolled against submarines off Nauplia, rescued survivors from Slamat, but was then sunk by aircraft.

At 2340 hrs on 26 April the light cruisers Orion and HMAS Perth joined Khedive Ismail, Slamat, Calcutta and four destroyers in the Bay of Nauplia. The destroyer HMS Diamond patrolled against the risk of submarines while the other ships took turns to embark troops. The only available tenders were landing craft A5, local caïques and the ships' own boats. One caïque, Agios Giorgios, was a large boat with capacity for 600 men. There was a swell and a light wind, and in the dark there were one or two accidents and one ship's whaler capsized. Calcutta and Orion embarked 960 and 600 troops respectively; the destroyers HMS Hotspur and Isis 500 and 408. The slow rate of embarkation meant that Khedive Ismail did not get her turn and did not embark any troops.

At 0300 hrs Calcutta ordered all ships to sail, but Slamat disobeyed and continued embarking troops. Calcutta and Khedive Ismail sailed at 0400 hrs; Slamat followed at 0415 hrs, by which time she had embarked about 500 troops: about half her capacity. An estimated 700–2,000 men were left behind, but Hotspur remained at Nauplia to embark as many of them as possible.

== Loss of Slamat ==
The convoy steamed south down the Argolic Gulf; Calcutta and Khedive Ismail at 12 knots (22 km/h) and Slamat full ahead at 16 knots (30 km/h) to catch up. At 0645 or 0715 hrs Luftwaffe aircraft attacked the convoy off Leonidion near the mouth of the gulf. Three Messerschmitt Bf 109 fighters attacked first, followed by a Staffel of nine Junkers Ju 87 Stuka dive bombers from Sturzkampfgeschwader 77 at Almyros, Junkers Ju 88 and Dornier Do 17 bombers and more Bf 109s. The attackers mainly targeted the troop ships, but anti-aircraft fire from Calcutta and Diamond at first prevented aircraft from hitting Slamat. Then a SC250 250 kg (550 lb) bomb exploded between her bridge and forward funnel, setting the bridge, control room and Master's cabin afire. Her water system became disabled, hampering her crew's ability to fight the fire. Another bomb also hit the ship and she listed to starboard.

Slamat's Master, Tjalling Luidinga, gave the order to abandon ship. The bombing and fire had destroyed some of her lifeboats and life rafts, and her remaining boats and rafts were launched under a second Stuka attack. Hotspur reported seeing four bombs hit Slamat. At least two lifeboats capsized; No. 10 from overloading and No. 4 when, in the midst of transferring survivors, Diamond had to speed away from her to evade an air attack. One Stuka pilot, Bertold Jung, saw "one or two" fellow-pilots machine-gunning survivors in the boats. Jung had served in the German navy, and back at Almyros airfield he complained very strongly that people in lifeboats had suffered enough so in future they should be spared.

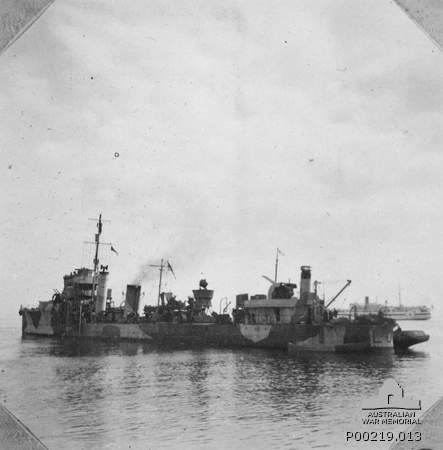
HMS Wryneck came to Diamond's aid, rescued survivors from Slamat but was then sunk along with Diamond.

Orion, Isis and Khedive Ismail kept moving to reach Souda Bay, while Calcutta rescued some survivors and ordered the destroyer Diamond to go alongside Slamat to rescue more. At 0815 hrs Diamond reported that she was still rescuing survivors and still under air attack. At 0916 hrs the destroyers HMAS Vendetta, HMAS Waterhen and HMS Wryneck arrived from Souda Bay in Crete to reinforce the convoy, so Calcutta sent Wryneck to assist Diamond. At 0925 hrs Diamond reported that she had rescued most of the survivors and was proceeding to Souda Bay. She left several people behind on life rafts, where aircraft machine-gunned them. Calcutta's captain said the attack continued until about 1000 hrs. Wryneck reached Diamond about 1000 hrs and signalled a request for aircraft cover at 1025 hrs.

Diamond accompanied by Wryneck returned to Slamat, arriving about 1100 hrs. The destroyers found Slamat's No. 10 and No. 4 lifeboats, both of which had been righted. They rescued 30 troops and two Dutch crew from No. 10 and Slamat's Second Officer and several other survivors from No. 4. Slamat was afire from stem to stern, and Diamond fired a torpedo at her port side that sank her in a coup de grâce. By now Diamond carried about 600 of Slamat's survivors, including Captain Luidinga.

== Loss of Diamond and Wryneck ==
About 1315 hrs a Staffel of between four and nine Ju 87 bombers came out of the sun in a surprise attack on the two destroyers.

One bomb hit Diamond's engine room, stopping her engines and bringing down her funnel, mast and radio aerial. Another exploded in the sea off her port side, holing her hull below her foredeck. Her engine room petty officer, H.T. Davis, had been on deck, but rushed below and released the pressure from her No. 3 boiler to prevent the risk of a boiler explosion. She sank in eight minutes. Both of her lifeboats were destroyed, but her crew launched her three Carley floats.

Three bombs hit Wryneck. The first exploded on her port side and damaged her hull; the second and third hit her engine room and bridge. Her Commissioned Engineer, Maurice Waldron, shut down her boilers and brought on deck a wounded Australian officer whom he had been looking after and put him in a Carley float. Wryneck capsized to port but managed to launch her whaler and three Carley floats before she sank in 10–15 minutes.

Lt Cdr Philip Cartwright, who commanded Diamond, was on a Carley float but gave his place to a sailor who was in the water. Cartwright was not seen again. Several men in the Carley floats died either from wounds or from drowning in the swell. They included Lt Cdr Robert Lane who commanded Wryneck, and Dr G.H. Brand who was the civilian ship's doctor on Slamat.

== Rescues ==
Wryneck's whaler suffered two holes but was repaired. Her occupants were wet through, her compass was damaged and her drinking water contaminated. Her four oars were serviceable, so Commissioned Engineer Waldron took command and she set off east past Cape Maleas, towing two Carley floats and their occupants. In the evening the wind increased, causing the floats to strike the boat, so Waldron reluctantly cast them adrift. Waldron was also nursing a Leading Seaman, George Fuller, who had bullet wounds in his belly and thigh.

At 1900 the cruiser HMS Phoebe and seven destroyers reached Souda Bay and disembarked evacuated troops. The Vice Admiral, Light Forces, Henry Pridham-Wippell, became concerned that Diamond was not among them. Between 1922 and 1955 hrs repeated attempts to radio Diamond drew no reply. Wryneck had been ordered to keep radio silence so no attempt was made to radio her. Instead Phoebe and Calcutta were asked if they had seen her, but their replies at 2235 and 2245 hrs were indefinite.

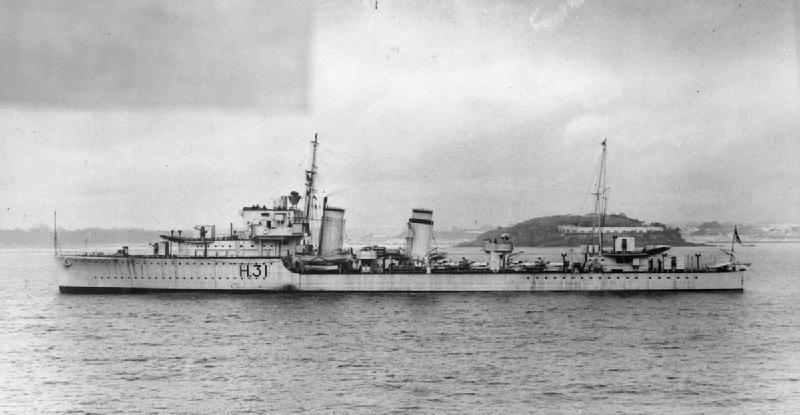
HMS Griffin rescued survivors from Wryneck and Diamond, some of whom were survivors from Slamat. She later took the survivors from Souda Bay to Port Said.

Pridham-Wippell sent the destroyer HMS Griffin to the position in the Argolic Gulf where Slamat had been lost. Griffin found 14 survivors in two Carley floats. At 0240 hrs she reported the rescue, said both destroyers had been sunk about 1330 hrs and she was still looking for Wryneck's whaler. In the morning she found more floats and another four survivors. She took the survivors to Crete.

The last living survivor from Slamat, Royal Army Service Corps veteran George Dexter, states that after Wryneck was sunk he and three other men were rescued by Orion.

On the morning of 28 April the whaler was about 30 nautical miles (56 km) off Milos in the Aegean Sea, so she set course for the island. At noon she sighted Ananes Rock, about 13 nautical miles (24 km) southeast of Milos, so Waldron decided to land there as everyone was exhausted. The rock has a bay, where the whaler found a caïque full of Greek refugees and British soldiers who had set out from Piraeus, were headed for Crete, but were sailing only by night to avoid detection. In the evening the caïque left Ananes and headed south for Crete. As many as possible of the survivors transferred to the caïque, but she was very full so she towed the whaler with five men still in it. On the morning of 29 April the caïque sighted a small landing craft, A6, which had set out from Porto Rafti near Athens. She took aboard everyone from the caïque and whaler, and the next day they reached Souda Bay. After a short stay the survivors from Slamat, Diamond and Wryneck were taken on HMS Hotspur to Port Said, Egypt.

== Casualties ==
Nearly 1,000 people were killed in the loss of Slamat, Diamond and Wryneck. Of the 500 or so soldiers that Slamat embarked, eight survived. Of her complement of 193 crew and 21 Australian and New Zealand DEMS gunners, 11 survived. Of Diamond's 166 complement, 20 survived. Of Wryneck's 106 crew, 27 survived. Slamat had a mixed crew of 84 Goans, 74 Dutch, 24 Chinese, 10 Australians and a Norwegian. The 11 survivors were six Goans, four Dutch and one other.

The bodies of three of Slamat's crew washed ashore far from the wreck: apprentice helmsman J Pille on the Greek island of Stamperia, Second Officer G van der Woude at Alexandria in Egypt, and lamp trimmer J van der Brugge at Gaza in Palestine.

== Controversy ==
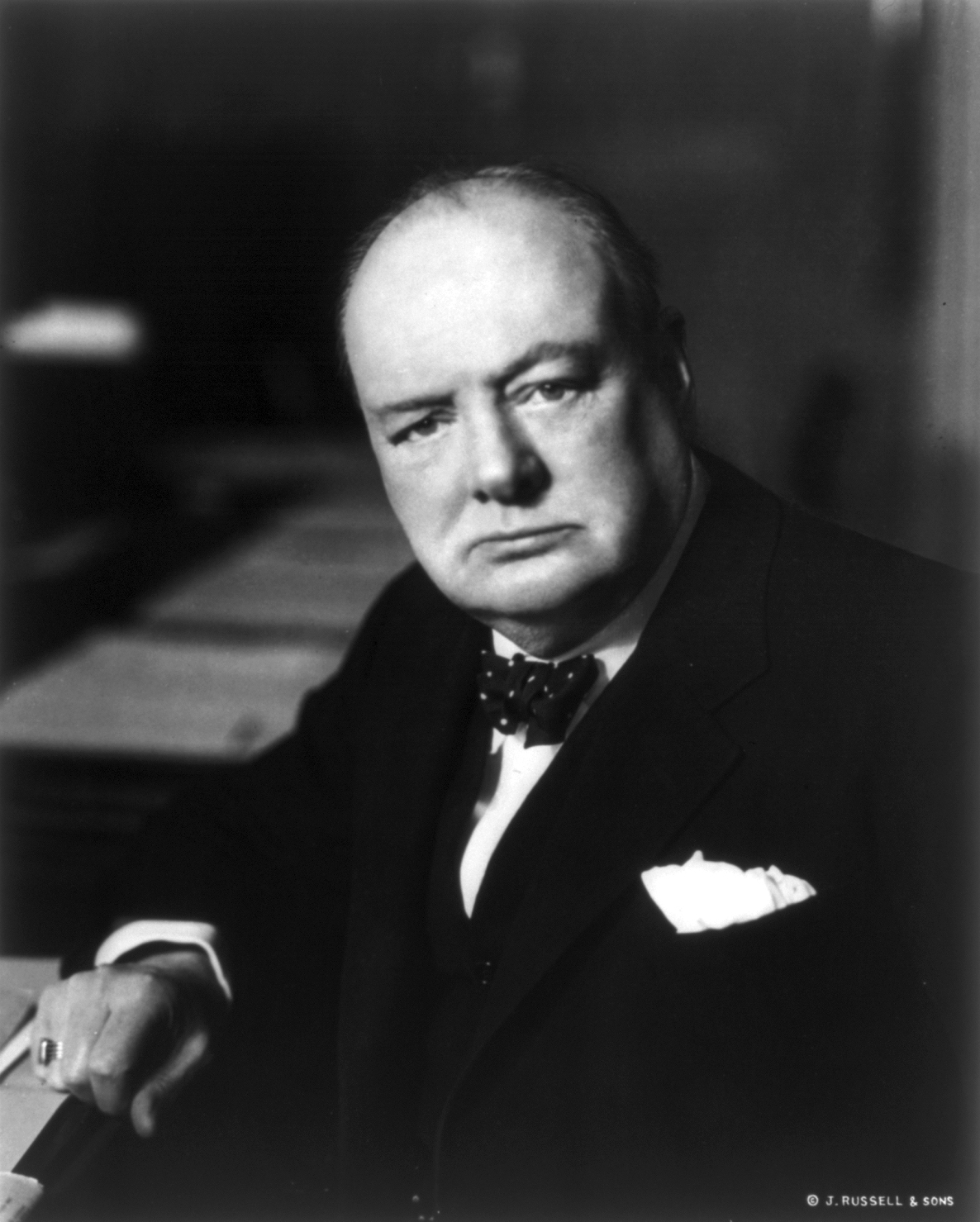
Winston Churchill called Captain Luidinga's delay "gallant but misguided".

Vice Admiral Pridham-Wippell held Slamat chiefly responsible of the disaster, asserting that her failure to depart until 75 minutes after she was ordered "resulted in her being within range of the dive bombers well after dawn." In a volume of his history The Second World War, Winston Churchill wrote "At Navplion there was a disaster. The Slamat, in a gallant but misguided effort to embark the maximum number of men, stayed too long in the anchorage". The Dutch historian Karel Bezemer agreed that had Slamat obeyed orders and left on time, the convoy would not have been attacked.

Frans Luidinga, who in 1995 published a book about his father Tjalling Luidinga, points out that had Slamat left on time, the convoy would have been only 20 nautical miles (37 km) further south at the time of the attack. This was still in range from Jg 77's base at Almyros and unlikely to have given enough advantage to the RAF's diminished fighter cover. The Germans knew the convoy would spend the night of 26–27 April evacuating troops from Nauplia and would not be far beyond the Argolic Gulf by daybreak. Frans Luidinga blames the Royal Navy for including troop ships in the evacuation, asserting that only warships had the speed, manoeuvrability and firepower to return from Nauplia under fire.

Against Luidinga's argument, the troop ship Khedive Ismail survived whereas the destroyers Diamond and Wryneck were sunk. And had the convoy been 20 nautical miles further south, Vendetta, Waterhen and Wryneck could have met it at 0800 instead of 0915 hrs, increasing both its anti-aircraft fire and capacity to rescue survivors. The distance from Almyros allowed the same Stukas to make repeated attack runs, although on the flight back to base one stopped at Corinth to refuel. Increasing their round trip by 40 nautical miles might have marginally reduced the aircraft's ability to attack repeatedly.

The general situation was such that had Slamat left on time as ordered, it would have been more likely only to mitigate an attack rather than avert one. The Admiralty may have been as concerned at the general risk arising from Allied and civilian ships not following Royal Navy orders, as at any direct loss that Luidinga's delay may or may not have caused.

== Awards and monuments ==
In November 1941 Philip Cartwright of HMS Diamond was posthumously made a Companion of the Distinguished Service Order. From HMS Wryneck, Maurice Waldron received the Distinguished Service Cross and George Fuller the Conspicuous Gallantry Medal. The Admiralty took the unusual step of publishing in The London Gazette its citation for Fuller: "who, though badly wounded, fought his gun till the last, and when his ship was sunk, heartened the survivors by his courage and cheerfulness".

In May 1945 the Netherlands were liberated and the Dutch government returned from exile. In August 1946 Queen Wilhelmina of the Netherlands wrote to Captain Luidinga's widow, expressing her sympathy for her husband's death, gratitude for his war service and commending him as een groot zoon van ons zeevarend volk ("a great son of our seafaring people").

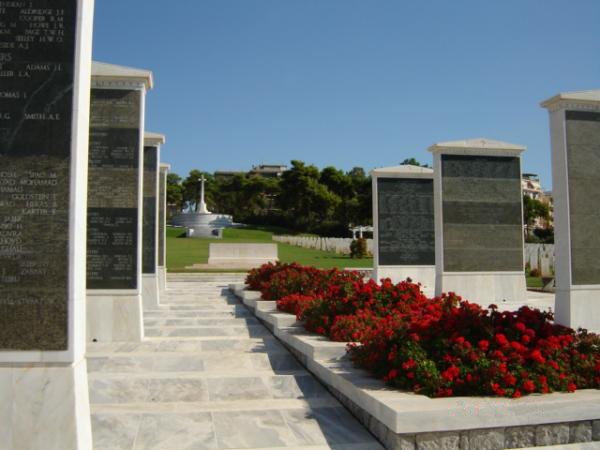
Part of the Athens Memorial in the CWGC's Phaleron Allied War Cemetery

British and Commonwealth troops and naval personnel who were lost in the sinking of Slamat, Diamond and Wryneck are named on the Commonwealth War Graves Commission's Athens Memorial in Phaleron Allied War Cemetery at Palaio Faliro southeast of Athens. Royal Navy personnel are also commemorated in Britain on the Royal Navy monuments at Chatham, Plymouth and Portsmouth. George Dexter commissioned a monument to all the service personnel lost when the three ships were sunk. It is in The Royal British Legion Club, Shard End, Birmingham.

There was no Dutch monument to Slamat until 2011, when one commemorating victims from all three ships was made by the Dutch sculptor Nicolas van Ronkenstein. It was installed in the Sint-Laurenskerk ("St Lawrence Church"), Rotterdam and formally unveiled on the 70th anniversary of the disaster, 27 April.

On 27 June 2012 the current HMS Diamond hosted a wreath-laying ceremony at the position where Slamat was sunk. Participants included Diamond's commander, descendants of some of the dead from the Netherlands and New Zealand, and the Commander in Chief of the Hellenic Navy.

== Sources and further reading ==
- Bezemer, K.W.L. (1987). Geschiedenis van de Nederlandse Koopvaardij in de Tweede Wereldoorlog (in Dutch). Elsevier. ISBN 90-100-6040-3.
- Crabb, Brian James (2021). Operation Demon. The story of the evacuation of British Commonwealth troops from mainland Greece and the tragic loss of the Dutch troopship Slamat and HM destroyers Diamond and Wryneck in April 1941. Angela Young. ISBN 978-1-527271-01-2.
- Luidinga, Frans (1995). Operation Demon. Het Scheepsjournal van Tjalling Luidinga 1890-1941. Gezagvoerder Bij de Rotterdamse Lloyd (in Dutch). self-published. ISBN 978-90-802461-2-6.
