= Slamat =

Slamat may refer to:

== People ==
- Muhammad Alwi Slamat (born 1998), Indonesian footballer
- Muhammad Kassim Slamat (born 1997), Indonesian footballer

== Other uses ==
- Slamat disaster, succession of shipwrecks
- SS Slamat, Dutch ocean liner
