= HMS Diamond (H22) =

D-class destroyer

Coordinates: 36°30′N 23°34′E

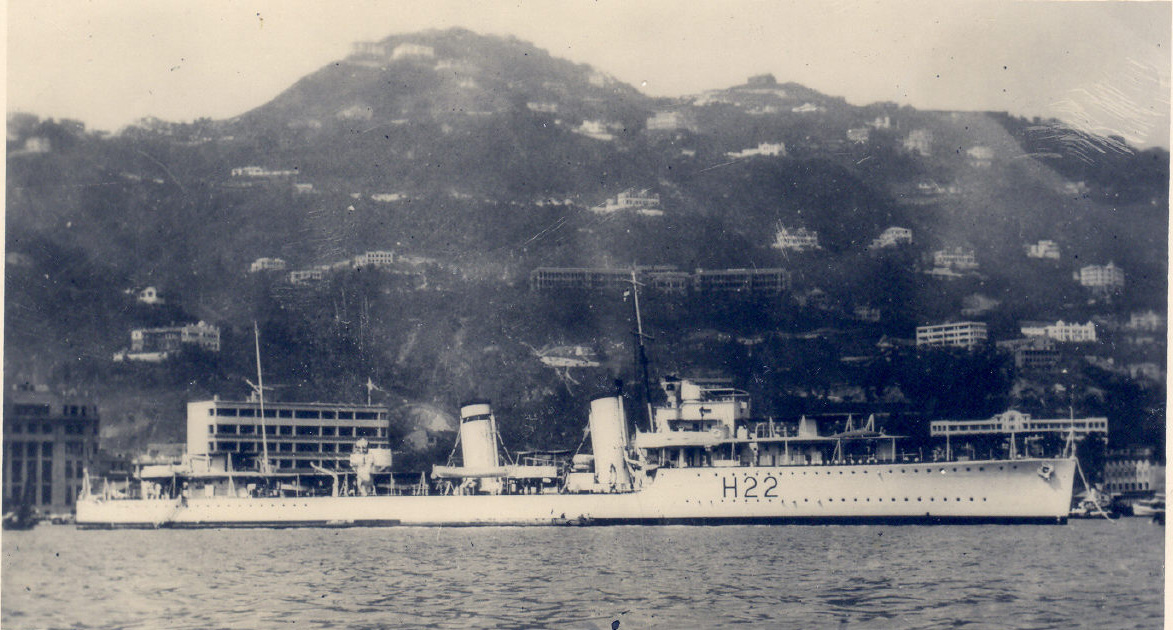
- Diamond anchored at Hong Kong before World War II

History

United Kingdom
- Name: HMS Diamond
- Ordered: 2 February 1931
- Builder: Vickers-Armstrongs, Barrow-in-Furness
- Cost: £223,509
- Laid down: 29 September 1931
- Launched: 8 April 1932
- Completed: 3 November 1932
- Fate: Sunk by air attack, 27 April 1941

General characteristics as built
- Class & type: D-class destroyer
- Displacement: 1,375 long tons (1,397 t) (standard); 1,890 long tons (1,920 t) (deep)
- Length: 329 ft (100.3 m) o/a
- Beam: 33 ft (10.1 m)
- Draught: 12 ft 6 in (3.8 m)
- Installed power: 36,000 shp (27,000 kW)
- Propulsion: 2 × shafts; 2 × Parsons geared steam turbines; 3 × Admiralty 3-drum boilers
- Speed: 36 knots (67 km/h; 41 mph)
- Range: 5,870 nmi (10,870 km; 6,760 mi) at 15 knots (28 km/h; 17 mph)
- Complement: 145
- Sensors & processing systems: ASDIC
- Armament: 4 × 4.7 in (120 mm) Mark IX guns; 1 × 12-pounder (3 in (76.2 mm)) anti-aircraft gun; 2 × 1 – QF 2 pdr (40 mm) Mk II guns; 2 × 4 – 21 inch (533 mm) torpedo tubes; 20 (later 35) × depth charges, 1 rail and 2 throwers

HMS Diamond was a D-class destroyer built for the Royal Navy in the early 1930s. The ship spent the bulk of her career on the China Station. She was briefly assigned to the Mediterranean Fleet in 1939 before she was transferred to West Africa for convoy escort duties. Diamond returned to the Mediterranean Fleet in early 1940 where she generally escorted convoys to and from Malta. The ship participated in the Battle of Cape Spartivento in November. Diamond was sunk by German aircraft on 27 April 1941 whilst evacuating Allied troops from Greece.

== Description ==
Diamond displaced 1,375 long tons (1,397 t) at standard load and 1,890 long tons (1,920 t) at deep load. The ship had an overall length of 329 feet (100.3 m), a beam of 33 feet (10.1 m) and a draught of 12 feet 6 inches (3.8 m). She was powered by Parsons geared steam turbines, driving two shafts, which developed a total of 36,000 shaft horsepower (27,000 kW) and gave a maximum speed of 36 knots (67 km/h; 41 mph). Steam for the turbines was provided by three Admiralty 3-drum boilers. Diamond carried a maximum of 473 long tons (481 t) of fuel oil that gave her a range of 5,870 nautical miles (10,870 km; 6,760 mi) at 15 knots (28 km/h; 17 mph). The ship's complement was 145 officers and men.

The ship mounted four 45-calibre 4.7-inch Mark IX guns in single mounts. For anti-aircraft (AA) defence, Diamond had a single 12-pounder (3-inch (76.2 mm)) gun between her funnels and two 40-millimetre (1.6 in) QF 2-pounder Mark II guns mounted on the side of her bridge. She was fitted with two above-water quadruple torpedo tube mounts for 21-inch torpedoes. One depth charge rail and two throwers were fitted; 20 depth charges were originally carried, but this increased to 35 shortly after the war began.

== Construction and career ==
Diamond was ordered on 2 February 1931 under the 1930 Naval Estimates, and was laid down at Vickers-Armstrongs' yard at Barrow-in-Furness on 29 September 1931. She was launched on 8 April 1932 and completed on 3 November 1933, at a total cost of £223,509, excluding equipment supplied by the Admiralty, such as weapons, ammunition and wireless equipment. The ship was initially assigned to the 1st Destroyer Flotilla in the Mediterranean and made a brief deployment to the Persian Gulf and Red Sea in September–November 1933. Diamond was refitted at Devonport Dockyard between 3 September and 27 October 1934 for service on the China Station with the 8th (later the 21st) Destroyer Flotilla and arrived there in January 1935, where she remained for the next four years.

The ship began a refit at Singapore on 7 August 1939 and she was transferred to the Mediterranean Fleet after it was completed in November. Diamond arrived at Malta on 19 December, but she was transferred to the South Atlantic Station the following month. She departed Malta on 8 January 1940, bound for Freetown where she joined the 20th Destroyer Division for escort duties. In April the ship returned to the Mediterranean where Diamond was assigned to the newly formed 10th Destroyer Flotilla after a short refit at Malta.

She was slightly damaged by air attacks on 11 and 17 June near Malta after the Italians declared war on the Allies on 10 June. Together with her sisters Dainty, Defender, the Australian destroyer Stuart, and the light cruisers Capetown and Liverpool, she escorted Convoy AN.2 from Egypt to various ports in the Aegean Sea in late July. Diamond bombarded the Italian seaplane base at Bomba, Libya on 23 August. A week later she escorted four transports to Malta with Dainty and the destroyers Jervis and Juno as part of Operation Hats. The ship escorted Convoy MB.8 during Operation Collar. After reaching Malta on 26 November, Diamond joined Force D and sailed to rendezvous with Force H, coming from Gibraltar. The next day, after the British forces had combined, they were spotted by the Italians and the inconclusive Battle of Cape Spartivento was fought.

During Operation Excess, Diamond and Defender escorted Convoy MW.5 to Malta in January 1941. In mid-April she escorted a convoy of four freighters from Malta to Alexandria.

=== Loss ===
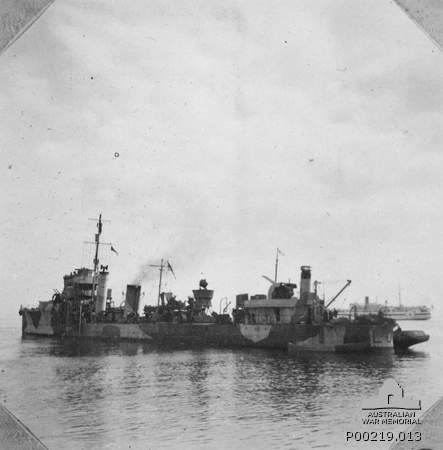
Wryneck came to Diamond's aid, rescued survivors from Slamat but was then sunk along with Diamond

On the evening of 26 April, Diamond was in the Argolic Gulf with three light cruisers, three other destroyers and two troopships. The force began evacuating British, Australian and New Zealand troops from Nauplia. The cruisers HMS Calcutta and HMS Orion and destroyers HMS Hotspur and HMS Isis embarked nearly 2,500 troops and, at 03:00 the next morning, Calcutta ordered the evacuation force to sail. One of the troop ships, the Dutch ocean liner Slamat, disobeyed and continued to embark troops. Slamat embarked 500 troops before she eventually obeyed orders at 04:15, and the convoy sailed for Crete.

Near the mouth of the Argolic Gulf a Staffel of nine Luftwaffe Junkers Ju 87 Stuka dive-bombers from Sturzkampfgeschwader 77 attacked the convoy at either 06:45 or 07:15. Slamat was hit, set afire and began to abandon ship. Calcutta ordered Diamond to go alongside Slamat to rescue survivors while the rest of the convoy continued to try to reach Souda Bay in Crete. At 08:15 Diamond reported that she was still rescuing survivors and still under air attack. By then three destroyers had reinforced the convoy so Calcutta sent one of them, HMS Wryneck, to assist Diamond. Slamat was afire from stem to stern when Diamond fired a torpedo that sank her in a coup de grâce. Diamond reported at 09:25 that she had rescued most of the survivors and was proceeding to Souda Bay. An hour later Wryneck signalled a request for aircraft cover.

At about 13:15, an air attack by German Messerschmitt Bf 109 fighters and Junkers Ju 88 bombers sank both destroyers within minutes. Wryneck launched her whaler, and each destroyer launched her three Carley floats. Survivors in the whaler set off east past Cape Maleas, towing two Carley floats and their occupants. In the evening the wind increased, causing the floats to strike the boat, so Waldron reluctantly cast them adrift.

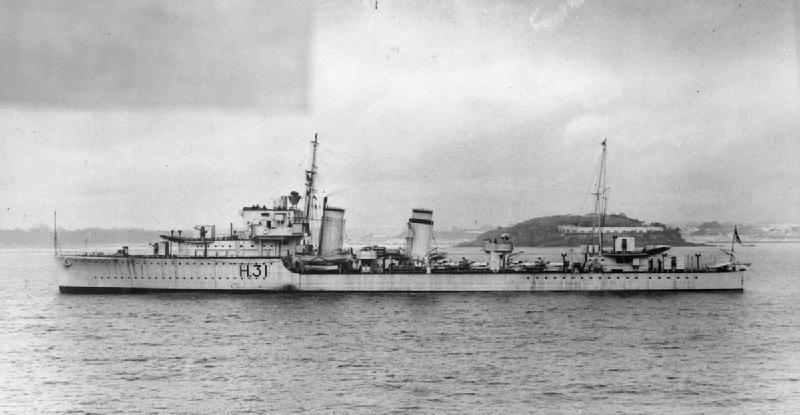
Griffin rescued 50 survivors from Wryneck and Diamond, some of whom were survivors from Slamat

After 1900 hrs on 27 April the Vice Admiral, Light Forces, Henry Pridham-Wippell, became concerned that Diamond had not returned to Souda Bay and was not answering radio signals. Wryneck had been ordered to keep radio silence so no attempt was made to radio her. Pridham-Wippell sent the destroyer HMS Griffin to the position where Slamat had been lost. She found 14 survivors in two Carley floats that night, more floats and another four survivors in the morning, and took the survivors to Crete.

Survivors in Wryneck's whaler reached Crete in three stages. On 28 April they aimed for the island of Milos in the Aegean Sea, but were too exhausted so they landed at Ananes Rock, about 13 nautical miles (24 km) southeast of Milos. There they met a caïque full of Greek refugees and British soldiers evacuated from Piraeus, who were sheltering by day and sailing only by night to avoid detection. In the evening everyone left Ananes and headed south for Crete, with most people in the caïque and five being towed in the whaler. On 29 April the caïque sighted a small landing craft that had left Porto Rafti near Athens. She took aboard everyone from the caïque and whaler, and the next day they reached Souda Bay.
