= HMS Wryneck =

Destroyer of the Royal Navy

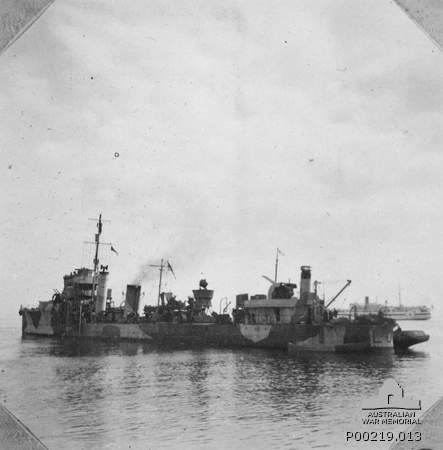
- Wryneck with a tug on her starboard side and a hospital ship in the background. About 1940, probably at Sollum, Egypt.

History

United Kingdom
- Name: HMS Wryneck
- Namesake: Wryneck
- Ordered: 16 December 1916
- Builder: Palmers, Jarrow
- Laid down: April 1917
- Launched: 13 May 1918
- Completed: 11 November 1918
- Motto: Lay on
- Honours and awards: Libya 1941; Mefditerranean – Greece 1941
- Fate: Sunk by aircraft in the Aegean north of Crete, 27 April 1941
- Badge: On a Field Green a Wryneck on a branch all Proper

General characteristics
- Class & type: Admiralty W-class destroyer
- Displacement: 1,100 long tons (1,118 t)
- Length: 312 ft (95 m) o/a; 300 ft (91 m) p/p
- Beam: 26 ft 9 in (8.15 m)
- Draught: 9 ft (2.7 m) standard; 11 ft (3.4 m) deep
- Propulsion: 3 × Yarrow-type water tube boilers; Parsons steam turbines; 27,000 shp (20,000 kW); 2 shafts
- Speed: 34 knots (63 km/h; 39 mph)
- Range: 320-370 tons oil; 3,500 nmi (6,500 km; 4,000 mi) at 15 knots (28 km/h; 17 mph); 900 nmi (1,700 km; 1,000 mi) at 32 knots (59 km/h; 37 mph)
- Complement: 110
- Armament: As built; 4 × QF 4 in Mk.V (102mm L/45) guns, mount P Mk.I; 2 × QF 2 pdr Mk.II "pom-pom" (40 mm L/39) anti-aircraft guns or 1 × QF 3 inch 20 cwt anti-aircraft gun; 6 (2×3) tubes for 21-inch (530 mm) torpedoes; From April 1940; 4 × QF 4 inch L/45 Mark XVI guns in two twin mounts HA/LA Mark XIX; 2 × quadruple Mark III Vickers .50 machine guns; 2 × racks and throwers for depth charges

HMS Wryneck was an Admiralty W-class destroyer of the Royal Navy, which was sunk during the Battle of Greece on 27 April 1941.

== Construction ==
The ship was ordered on 16 December 1916 from Palmers Shipbuilding and Iron Company at Jarrow in the 10th Order of the 1916–17 Programme. She was laid down in April 1917, launched on 13 May 1918, and completed on the last day of the war, 11 November 1918.

== Service history ==
After being accepted in service Wryneck took part in operations in the Baltic against the Bolsheviks. Sailors of the ship took part in the Royal Navy mutiny of 1919. She was part of the 5th Destroyer Flotilla in the Atlantic Fleet in 1921, which was transferred to the Mediterranean Fleet in 1925 as the 1st Destroyer Flotilla.

Wryneck was put into Reserve during the economic crisis of the 1930s and laid up in Gibraltar. In 1938 she was selected for WAIR conversion to a fast escort ship at Gibraltar Dockyard. The work began in September 1939 and was not completed until March 1940. In April 1940, after sea trials, Wryneck was recommissioned for service with the new pennant number L04, and assigned to convoy defence duty based at Alexandria. In December she was detached to support military operations against the Italian army in Egypt.

In January 1941 she resumed convoy defence duties, and in March formed part of the escort of military convoys taking British and Commonwealth troops to Greece as part of "Operation Lustre". In April, with the fall of Greece, Wryneck returned to help the evacuation of Allied troops.

== Loss ==
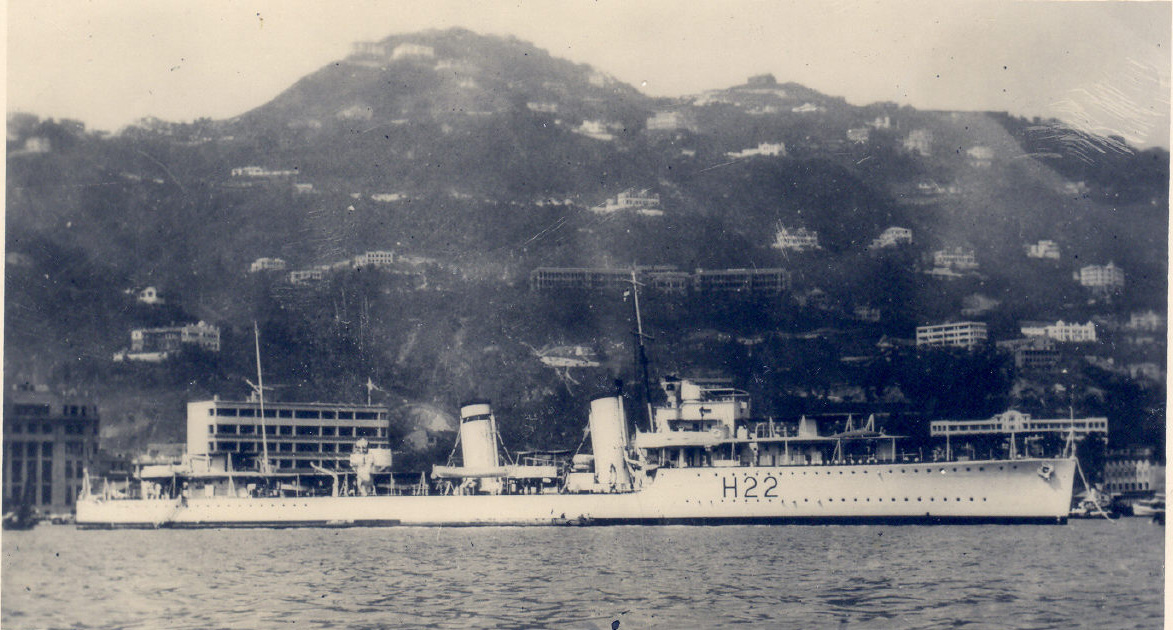
Wryneck was sent to help HMS Diamond rescue survivors from Slamat and fend off Luftwaffe attacks, but both destroyers were sunk.

On the morning of 27 April she was in Souda Bay when a convoy led by the cruiser HMS Calcutta evacuating troops from Nauplia in the Peloponnese came under air attack in the Argolic Gulf. HMAS Vendetta, HMAS Waterhen and Wryneck were ordered from Souda Bay to release the destroyers HMS Hotspur and HMS Isis, which were heavily laden with evacuated troops. By the time Vendetta, Waterhen and Wryneck reached the convoy, the Dutch troop ship Slamat had been disabled and left behind and the destroyer HMS Diamond had been ordered to stay and assist.

At 08:15 Diamond reported that she was still rescuing survivors and still under air attack. By then three destroyers had reinforced the convoy so Calcutta sent Wryneck to assist Diamond. Slamat was afire from stem to stern when Diamond fired a torpedo that sank her in a coup de grâce. Diamond reported at 09:25 that she had rescued most of the survivors and was proceeding to Souda Bay. An hour later Wryneck signalled a request for aircraft cover.

At about 13:15, an air attack by German Messerschmitt Bf 109 fighters and Junkers Ju 88 bombers sank both destroyers within minutes. Wryneck launched her whaler, and each destroyer launched her three Carley floats. Survivors in the whaler set off east past Cape Maleas, towing two Carley floats and their occupants. In the evening the wind increased, causing the floats to strike the boat, so Waldron reluctantly cast them adrift.

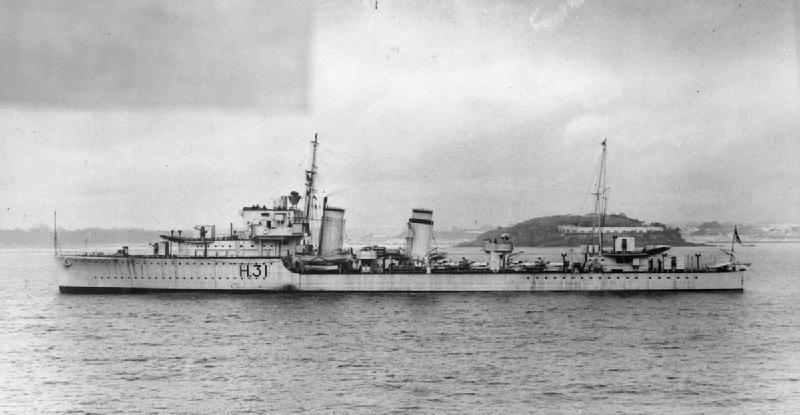
HMS Griffin rescued 50 survivors from Wryneck and Diamond, some of whom were survivors from Slamat

After 1900 hrs on 27 April the Vice Admiral, Light Forces, Henry Pridham-Wippell, became concerned that Diamond had not returned to Souda Bay and was not answering radio signals. Wryneck had been ordered to keep radio silence so no attempt was made to radio her. Pridham-Wippell sent the destroyer HMS Griffin to the position where Slamat had been lost. She found 14 survivors in two Carley floats that night, more floats and another four survivors in the morning, and took the survivors to Crete.

The last living survivor from Slamat, Royal Army Service Corps veteran George Dexter, states that after Wryneck was sunk he and three other men were rescued by the cruiser HMS Orion.

24 survivors in Wryneck's whaler, one of them severely wounded, reached Crete in three stages. On 28 April they aimed for the island of Milos in the Aegean Sea, but were too exhausted so they landed at Ananes Rock about 13 nautical miles (24 km) southeast of Milos after seeing two boys trying to draw their attention using a Union Jack. There they were met by the passengers of a caïque full of Greek refugees and British soldiers evacuated from Piraeus, who were sheltering by day and sailing only by night to avoid detection. They too had been bombed when another caïque carrying them, Irene, had been sighted near Monemvasia (Porto Gerakas) in the daytime when they were resting ashore. Embarking on another hastily bought caique, they sailed on to the Ananes.

Among the passengers were the historian and SOE operative Nicholas Hammond, Major Ian Pirie the leader of the British expedition to Greece together with expatriate and high-ranking SOE operative David Pawson, as well as four Australian privates. The caïque's captain, George Vergos, was also involved in SOE work and was a decorated veteran (OBE) of the Royal Navy from the First World War, also fleeing Greece with his extended family and some other Greeks. Pirie and Pawson together with Dennis Hamson were now charged with evacuating an unknown amount of bullion from the British Embassy in Athens, all lost with the Irene.

In the evening everyone left Ananes and headed south for Crete, with most people in the caïque and four being towed in the whaler. Five of the women and children were placed in a skiff on deck with a tarpaulin over them as the sea spray from a strong southerly wind was washing the deck. The next day all 46 people reached Souda Bay whose jetty was at the time under heavy aerial bombardment. They were making very slow progress in the small caïque so a faster landing craft was sent out to tow them to safety.

Its final resting place is 36.30N 23.34E which is about 20 nautical miles (37 kilometres; 23 miles) east of Cape Maleas, Greece.

== Bibliography ==
- Campbell, John (1985). Naval Weapons of World War II. Annapolis, Maryland: Naval Institute Press. ISBN 0-87021-459-4.
- Carew, Anthony (1981). The Lower Deck of the Royal Navy 1900-39: The Invergordon Mutiny in Perspective. Manchester University Press. ISBN 9780719008412.
- Chesneau, Roger, ed. (1980). Conway's All the World's Fighting Ships 1922–1946. Greenwich, UK: Conway Maritime Press. ISBN 0-85177-146-7.
- Colledge, J. J.; Warlow, Ben (2006) [1969]. Ships of the Royal Navy: The Complete Record of All Fighting Ships of the Royal Navy from the 15th Century to the Present (3rd Rev ed.). London: Chatham Publishing. ISBN 978-1-86176-281-8. OCLC 67375475.
- Crabb, Brian James. Operation Demon. The story of the evacuation of British Commonwealth troops from mainland Greece and the tragic loss of the Dutch troopship Slamat and HM destroyers Diamond and Wryneck in April 1941. Angela Young 2021. ISBN 978-1-527271-01-2.
- Campbell, John (1985). Naval Weapons of World War II. Annapolis, Maryland: Naval Institute Press. ISBN 0-87021-459-4.
- Friedman, Norman (2009). British Destroyers From Earliest Days to the Second World War. Annapolis, Maryland: Naval Institute Press. ISBN 978-1-59114-081-8.
- Gardiner, Robert & Gray, Randal, eds. (1985). Conway's All the World's Fighting Ships 1906–1921. Annapolis, Maryland: Naval Institute Press. ISBN 0-85177-245-5.
- Lenton, H. T. (1998). British & Empire Warships of the Second World War. Annapolis, Maryland: Naval Institute Press. ISBN 1-55750-048-7.
- March, Edgar J. (1966). British Destroyers: A History of Development, 1892–1953; Drawn by Admiralty Permission From Official Records & Returns, Ships' Covers & Building Plans. London: Seeley Service. OCLC 164893555.
- Preston, Antony (1971). 'V & W' Class Destroyers 1917–1945. London: Macdonald. OCLC 464542895.
- Raven, Alan & Roberts, John (1979). 'V' and 'W' Class Destroyers. Man o'War. Vol. 2. London: Arms & Armour. ISBN 0-85368-233-X.
- Rohwer, Jürgen (2005). Chronology of the War at Sea 1939–1945: The Naval History of World War Two (Third Revised ed.). Annapolis, Maryland: Naval Institute Press. ISBN 1-59114-119-2.
- Shores, Christopher; Cull, Brian; Malizia, Nicola (1987). Air War for Yugoslavia, Greece, and Crete. London: Grub Street. ISBN 0-948817-07-0.
- Whinney, Bob (2000). The U-boat Peril: A Fight for Survival. Cassell. ISBN 0-304-35132-6.
- Whitley, M. J. (1988). Destroyers of World War 2. Annapolis, Maryland: Naval Institute Press. ISBN 0-87021-326-1.
- Winser, John de D. (1999). B.E.F. Ships Before, At and After Dunkirk. Gravesend, Kent: World Ship Society. ISBN 0-905617-91-6.
