= James Gornall =

James Gornall may refer to:

- James Gornall (Royal Navy officer) (1899–1983), English cricketer and Royal Navy officer
- James Gornall (racing driver) (born 1984), British racing driver
