= Prasiae (Attica) =

Coordinates: 37°51′55″N 24°02′15″E

Prasiae or Prasiai (Ancient Greek: Πρασίαι) was a deme of ancient Attica on the east coast, between Potamus and Steiria, with an excellent harbour, from which the Theoria or sacred procession used to sail. Here was a temple of Apollo, and also the tomb of Erysichthon of Attica, who died at this place on his return from Delos.

The ruins of the deme are seen on the north-east side of the bay. The harbour, now called Porto Rafti, is the best on the eastern coast of Attica, and is both deep and capacious. The entrance of the harbour is more than a mile in breadth; and in the centre of the entrance there is a rocky islet, upon which is a colossal statue of white marble, from which the harbour has derived its modem name, since it is commonly supposed to bear some resemblance to a tailor (ῥάφτης) at work. The statue evidently belongs to the Roman period, and probably to the first or second century after the Christian era. In the middle of the bay there is a rocky promontory with ruins of the middle ages upon it, which promontory Ludwig Ross supposes to be the Coroneia of Stephanus of Byzantium.
