= Steiria (Attica) =

Ancient Athenian deme

Coordinates: 37°53′53″N 24°00′39″E

Steiria (Ancient Greek: Στείρια) was a deme of ancient Attica on the east coast, between Prasiae and Brauron, which belonged to the phyle of Pandionis. Stiris in Phocis is said to have been founded by the inhabitants of this deme. The road from Attica to Steiria and the harbour of Prasiae was called the Στειριακὴ ὁδός. Steiria, located west of Porto Rafti, was the deme of Theramenes and Thrasybulus.

== People ==
- Theramenes (d. 404 BCE), Athenian statesman
- Thrasybulus (c. 440 – 388 BCE), Athenian general
