= Muhammad Kassim Slamat =

Indonesian footballer

Kassim Slamat
Personal information
- Full name: Muhammad Kassim Slamat
- Date of birth: August 8, 1997 (age 29)
- Place of birth: Ambon, Indonesia
- Height: 1.66 m (5 ft 5 in)
- Positions: Defender; midfielder

Senior career*
Years	Team	Apps	(Gls)
2014–2015	PS Mojokerto Putra	6	(0)
2017–2019	Persikabo	34	(0)
2020–2021	Persiraja	0	(0)
2021	PSPS Riau	10	(0)
2022	Putra Delta Sidoarjo	1	(0)
- * Club domestic league appearances and goals as of 27 September 2022

Muhammad Kassim Slamat (born 8 August 1997), or simply known as Kassim Slamat, is an Indonesian professional footballer who plays as a defender or midfielder. Previously, he played for Persikabo. He is also a member of Indonesian Army.

== Club career ==
=== TIRA-Persikabo ===
As a member of Indonesian Army, he joined the club which is owned by the Indonesian National Armed Forces, TIRA-Persikabo (now: Persikabo 1973), in 2017 to play in Liga 1. He spent his time at TIRA-Persikabo for 3 seasons.

=== Persiraja ===
The newly promoted club, Persiraja Banda Aceh, confirmed that Muhammad Kassim Slamat will play for them to compete in 2020 Liga 1. This season was suspended on 27 March 2020 due to the COVID-19 pandemic. The season was abandoned and was declared void on 20 January 2021.

=== PSPS Riau ===
In 2021, Kassim signed a contract with Indonesian Liga 2 club PSPS Riau. He made his league debut on 6 October against Semen Padang at the Gelora Sriwijaya Stadium, Palembang.

== Career statistics ==
As of match played 27 September 2022

Club	Season	League			Cup		Continental		Other		Total	
Club	Season	Division	Apps	Goals	Apps	Goals	Apps	Goals	Apps	Goals	Apps	Goals
PS Mojokerto Putra	2014	Premier Division	6	0	0	0	-	-	-	-	6	0
TIRA-Persikabo	2017	Liga 1	21	0	-	-	-	-	-	-	21	0
TIRA-Persikabo	2018	Liga 1	8	0	-	-	-	-	-	-	8	0
TIRA-Persikabo	2019	Liga 1	5	0	-	-	-	-	-	-	5	0
TIRA-Persikabo	Total		34	0	0	0	0	0	0	0	34	0
Persiraja	2020	Liga 1	0	0	0	0	-	-	-	-	0	0
Persiraja	2021	Liga 1	0	0	-	-	-	-	2 (Note: Appearances in Menpora Cup)	0	2	0
PSPS Riau	2021	Liga 2	10	0	0	0	-	-	-	-	10	0
Putra Delta Sidoarjo	2022	Liga 2	1	0	0	0	-	-	-	-	1	0
Career total			51	0	0	0	0	0	2	0	53	0
