= James Gornall (Royal Navy officer) =

English cricketer

Captain James Gornall DSO
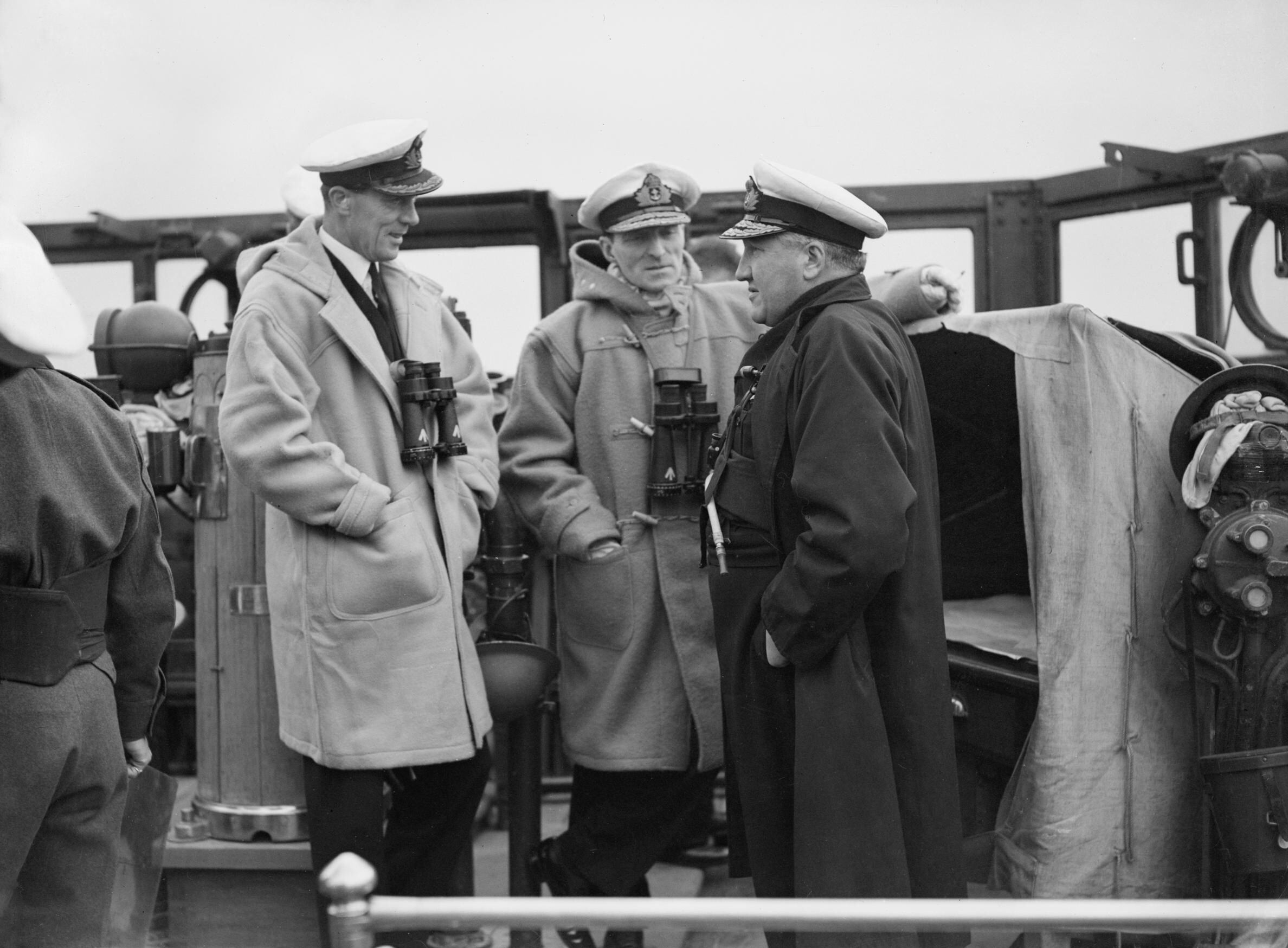
- Captain J. P. Gornall (left) on his ship HMS Orion
- Born: James Parrington Gornall; 22 September 1899; Farnborough, Hampshire, England
- Died: 13 November 1983 (aged 84); Lower Froyle, Hampshire, England
- Cricket career

Cricket information
- Batting: Right-handed
- Bowling: Right-arm medium

Domestic team information
- Years: Team
- 1923: Hampshire

Career statistics
Competition	First-class
Matches	4
Runs scored	149
Batting average	18.62
100s/50s	–/–
Top score	33
Balls bowled	36
Wickets	0
Bowling average	–
5 wickets in innings	–
10 wickets in match	–
Best bowling	–
Catches/stumpings	1/–
- Source: Cricinfo, 9 January 2010

James Parrington Gornall DSO (22 September 1899 – 13 November 1983) was an English first-class cricketer and Royal Navy officer, who captained the Royal Navy Leander-class light cruiser HMS Orion during the Second World War, from 1943 to 1945.

== Early life and naval career ==
Gornall was born at Farnborough in September 1899. He was educated at Christ's Hospital, where he played for the school cricket team. Gornall joined the Royal Navy in September 1917, serving in the final year of the First World War. Following the war, he was promoted to lieutenant in October 1920, before matriculating to the University of Cambridge where he studied at Corpus Christi College, Cambridge in 1921, Described by Wisden as "a good club batsman", Gornall made his debut in first-class cricket for the Royal Navy against the British Army cricket team at Lord's in 1921. He remained enlisted in the Royal Navy whilst at Cambridge, allowing him to play in the same fixture in 1923. Gornall appeared for Hampshire in the 1923 County Championship at Portsmouth, before making a final first-class appearance for the Royal Navy against the Army at Lord's in 1924. In four first-class matches, Gornall scored 149 runs at an average of 18.62, with a highest score of 33.

In the Navy, he was promoted to lieutenant commander in October 1928, before being promoted to commander in December 1934.

== WWII service and later life ==
Gornall served in the Second World War, being appointed executive officer aboard HMS Shropshire a month prior to the start of the war. He was appointed Shropshire's commanding officer in March 1941, before being transferred to the shore establishment HMS Kestrel as its commanding officer the following month. Whilst commanding Kestrel, Gornall was promoted to captain in December 1941. His appointment at Kestrel lasted until October 1943, after which he briefly undertook duties aboard HMS Victory and the shore establishment HMS President. At the beginning of 1941, he was placed in command of the Leander-class light cruiser HMS Orion in the Mediterranean Sea, taking part in the Operation Shingle landings which were a prelude to the wider Battle of Anzio. Orion later took part in the Normandy landings in June 1944, and following the landings carried out an effective bombardment in the vicinity of Tilly-sur-Seulles on 10 June. Orion returned to the Mediterranean in 1945, with Gornall hosting Winston Churchill aboard Orion as he awaited the arrival of U.S. President Franklin D. Roosevelt aboard the USS Quincy into the Grand Harbour in Malta, prior to their departure to the Yalta Conference. He was mentioned in dispatches in July and November 1944, and was made a Companion of the Distinguished Service Order in the 1945 Birthday Honours.

Following the war, Gornall was appointed an aide-de-camp to George VI in July 1950, prior to his retirement in January 1951. Gornall died in November 1983 at Lower Froyle, Hampshire.
