= HMS Griffin (H31) =

G-class destroyer, built for the Royal Navy in the mid-1930s

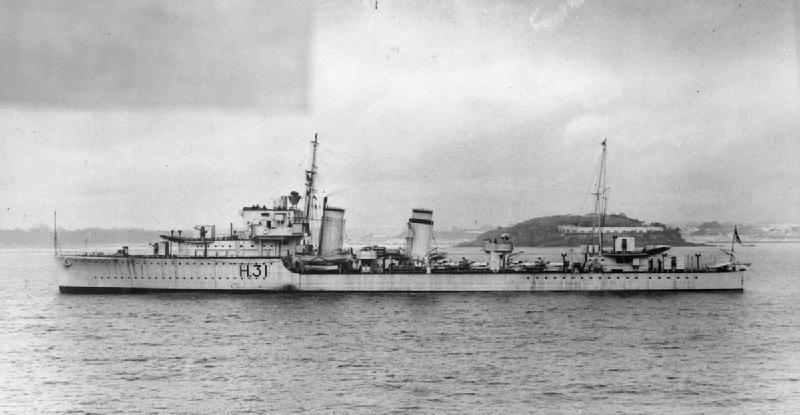
- Griffin in 1936

History

United Kingdom
- Name: Griffin
- Namesake: Griffin
- Builder: Vickers-Armstrongs, Barrow-in-Furness, UK
- Cost: £248,518
- Laid down: 20 September 1934
- Launched: 15 August 1935
- Commissioned: 6 June 1936
- Motto: Dentibus ac rostro; (Latin : "With teeth and beak")
- Fate: Transferred to Canada, 1 March 1943

Canada
- Name: Ottawa
- Namesake: Ottawa River
- Acquired: By purchase, 1 March 1943; Gifted, 15 June 1943
- Commissioned: 7 April 1943
- Decommissioned: May 1945
- Identification: Pennant number: H31
- Honours and awards: Atlantic, 1939-45; Normandy, 1944; English Channel, 1944; Biscay, 1944
- Fate: Sold for scrap, August 1946

General characteristics (as built)
- Class & type: G-class destroyer
- Displacement: 1,350 long tons (1,370 t) (standard); 1,883 long tons (1,913 t) (deep load)
- Length: 323 ft (98.5 m)
- Beam: 33 ft (10.1 m)
- Draught: 12 ft 5 in (3.8 m)
- Installed power: 3 Admiralty 3-drum boilers; 34,000 shp (25,000 kW)
- Propulsion: 2 shafts, 2 geared steam turbines
- Speed: 36 knots (67 km/h; 41 mph)
- Range: 5,530 nmi (10,240 km; 6,360 mi) at 15 knots (28 km/h; 17 mph)
- Complement: 137 (peacetime), 146 (wartime)
- Armament: 4 × single 4.7 in (120 mm) guns; 2 × quadruple 0.5 in (12.7 mm) machine guns; 2 × quadruple 21 in (533 mm) torpedo tubes; 20 × depth charges, 1 rail and 2 throwers

HMS Griffin (H31) was a G-class destroyer, built for the Royal Navy in the mid-1930s. In World War II she took part in the Norwegian Campaign of April–May 1940 and the Battle of Dakar in September before being transferred to the Mediterranean Fleet in November. She generally escorted larger ships of the Mediterranean Fleet as they protected convoys against attacks from the Italian Fleet. Griffin took part in the Battle of Cape Matapan in March 1941 and the evacuations of Greece and Crete in April–May 1941. In June she took part in the Syria-Lebanon Campaign and was escorting convoys and the larger ships of the Mediterranean Fleet until she was transferred to the Eastern Fleet in March 1942.

Griffin saw no action in the Japanese Indian Ocean raid in April, but was escorting convoys for most of her time in the Indian Ocean. In June she returned to the Mediterranean to escort another convoy to Malta in Operation Vigorous. Beginning in November 1942, she was converted to an escort destroyer in the United Kingdom and was transferred to the Royal Canadian Navy on 1 March 1943. The ship, now renamed HMCS Ottawa, was assigned to escort convoys in the North Atlantic until she was transferred in May 1944 to protect the forces involved with the Normandy Landings. Working with other destroyers, Ottawa sank three German submarines off the French coast before she returned to Canada for a lengthy refit. After the end of the European war in May 1945 she was used to bring Canadian troops until she was paid off in October 1945. Ottawa was sold for scrap in August 1946.

== Description ==
Griffin displaced 1,350 long tons (1,370 t) at standard load and 1,883 long tons (1,913 t) at deep load. She had an overall length of 323 feet (98.5 m), a beam of 33 feet (10.1 m) and a draught of 12 feet 5 inches (3.8 m). She was powered by Parsons geared steam turbines, driving two shafts, which developed a total of 34,000 shaft horsepower (25,000 kW) and gave a maximum speed of 36 knots (67 km/h; 41 mph). Steam for the turbines was provided by three Admiralty 3-drum boilers. Griffin carried a maximum of 470 long tons (480 t) of fuel oil that gave her a range of 5,530 nautical miles (10,240 km; 6,360 mi) at 15 knots (28 km/h; 17 mph). Her complement was 137 officers and men in peacetime, but in increased to 146 in wartime.

The ship mounted four 45-calibre 4.7-inch (120 mm) Mark IX guns in single mounts. For anti-aircraft (AA) defence, Griffin had two quadruple Mark I mounts for the 0.5 inch Vickers Mark III machine gun. She was fitted with two above-water quadruple torpedo tube mounts for 21-inch (533 mm) torpedoes. One depth charge rail and two throwers were fitted; 20 depth charges were originally carried, but this increased to 35 shortly after the war began.

Beginning in mid-1940, her anti-aircraft armament was increased although when exactly the modifications were made is not known. The rear set of torpedo tubes was replaced by a 3-inch (76.2 mm) (12-pounder) AA gun and the quadruple .50-calibre Vickers mounts were replaced by 20-millimetre (0.8 in) Oerlikon autocannon. Two more Oerlikon guns were also added in the forward superstructure.

== Service history ==
Griffin was laid down by Vickers-Armstrongs Naval Construction Works at Barrow-in-Furness on 20 September 1934, launched on 15 August 1935, and completed on 6 March 1936. Excluding government-furnished equipment such as armament, she cost £248,518. Griffin joined her sisters and was assigned to the 1st Destroyer Flotilla of the Mediterranean Fleet upon commissioning. She escorted the ocean liner SS Strathnaver between Malta and Alexandria in the Munich Crisis in September 1938. She then escorted the light cruiser Arethusa on her voyage to Aden. She collided with the target destroyer Shikari on 2 February 1939 and her repairs were completed five days later.

=== With the Royal Navy, 1939–1942 ===
On 3 September 1939 Griffin was in Alexandria and still assigned to the 1st Destroyer Flotilla. In October she was transferred to home waters. On 7 October she was escorting the 7,289 GRT troop ship Mohamed Ali El-Kebir from Avonmouth bound for Gibraltar when the German submarine U-38 torpedoed the troop ship in the Western Approaches about 230 nautical miles (430 km) west of Bloody Foreland in Ireland. 96 people were killed but Griffin attacked and chased away the submarine with depth charges and then rescued 766 survivors, whom she landed at Greenock on the Firth of Clyde on 9 October.

She rejoined her flotilla at Harwich in November, where they patrolled the North Sea and escorted local convoys. She rescued survivors from her sister Gipsy after that ship struck a mine off Harwich on 21 November. She was damaged the same month and was under repair until 6 December. On 19 January 1940, Griffin was taking part in a patrol east of Harwich with sister ship Grenade and the destroyer leader Grenville when Grenville struck a mine and quickly sank. Griffin and Grenade rescued survivors from Grenville. On 9 March 1940, Griffin was attacked and strafed by a German Heinkel He 111 bomber, with one crewmember, a cook, killed. In preparation for the Norwegian Campaign, Griffin was transferred to the Home Fleet at Scapa Flow in April 1940.Griffin escorted the capital ships of the Home Fleet as they sortied into the North Sea on 7 April and continued that duty for the next several weeks.

On 26 April, Griffin and the destroyer Acheron captured the German trawler Schiff 26, bound for Narvik with a cargo that included guns, mines and ammunition. She was disguised as the Dutch Polares and armed with one gun and two torpedo tubes. Crewmen aboard the trawler failed to properly dispose of some of her code documents when she was boarded from Griffin. The recovered material allowed Bletchley Park to retrospectively break 6 days of naval Enigma codes. Whilst not operationally useful, this was the first break of the code and gave Alan Turing essential information on how Enigma was used, so allowing methods to be developed for future breaks. This was the first of several similar captures that were essential for the continued Allied breaking of the naval Enigma codes.

Griffin evacuated British and French troops from Namsos, and rescued survivors from the destroyer Afridi after she was sunk by Junkers Ju 87 Stuka dive bombers on 3 May. The Stukas also attacked Griffin, without success. Griffin was then transferred to the 13th Destroyer Flotilla of the North Atlantic Command at Gibraltar. She escorted the capital ships of Force H in the Battle of Dakar on 23 September, but was not engaged. On 20 October, with her sisters Gallant and Hotspur, she sank the Italian submarine Lafolè off Melilla. Griffin escorted the battleship Barham and the cruisers Berwick and Glasgow in Operation Coat in early November as they joined the Mediterranean Fleet. Griffin herself was transferred to the 14th Destroyer Flotilla in Alexandria and took part in the inconclusive Battle of Cape Spartivento on 27 November in Operation Collar.

In Operation Excess, Gallant struck a mine off Pantellaria on 10 January 1941 and Griffin rescued most of the survivors. In February 1941 she was transferred to the Red Sea where she escorted the aircraft carrier Formidable in the latter's operations in support of the military offensive in Italian Somaliland ("Operation Canvas"). Griffin escorted the capital ships of the Mediterranean Fleet in the Battle of Cape Matapan on 28–29 March. With her sister Greyhound, she attacked some of the Italian destroyers, but lost them when they passed through their own smokescreen. Griffin, the Australian destroyer Stuart, and the gunboat Gnat bombarded Axis positions near Sollum in northwestern Egypt on 15 April.

She took part in the evacuation of British, Australian and New Zealand troops from Greece at the end of April. On 25 April a German air attack crippled the Dutch troop ship Pennland, which Griffin had been escorting to Megara to evacuate Allied troops. Griffin rescued about 300 survivors, sank Pennland by gunfire, and took the survivors to Crete. On 27 April Griffin rescued 50 survivors from the destroyers Diamond and Wryneck, which had been sunk by German aircraft in the Sea of Crete.

Griffin again escorted the capital ships of the Mediterranean Fleet as they covered a convoy from Alexandria to Malta on 8 May. In the evacuation of Crete at the end of May, Griffin evacuated 720 men from Souda Bay.

During Operation Exporter, the ship escorted the Australian light cruiser Perth as she bombarded Vichy French positions in Lebanon on 2 July. Griffin escorted convoys to and from Tobruk from July to November. On 25 November she was escorting the battleships of the Mediterranean Fleet when Barham was torpedoed by German submarine U-331. She escorted the light cruiser Naiad when that ship bombarded Derna in early December and was transferred to the 2nd Destroyer Flotilla later that month. Griffin escorted convoys to Malta in January and February 1942. until she was transferred to the Eastern Fleet in the Indian Ocean in late February. Griffin was assigned to Force A of the fleet in the Indian Ocean raid by the Japanese in early April 1942. She returned to the Mediterranean to take part in Operation Vigorous, another convoy from Alexandria to Malta, in June. She rejoined the Eastern Fleet afterwards and escorted convoys there until ordered home to begin conversion to an escort destroyer in September.

=== Refit and transfer to Canada, 1942–1946 ===
Work on the conversion began on 2 November in Southampton and included the removal of two 4.7-inch guns and the 12-pounder AA gun, and their replacement with a Hedgehog anti-submarine mortar forward and additional depth charges aft. Type 286 and 271 radar sets were fitted, as well as additional 20 mm Oerlikon AA guns. While still refitting, on 1 March 1943, Griffin was transferred to the Royal Canadian Navy, and commissioned on 20 March, four days before her conversion was finished. The ship was renamed Ottawa on 10 April to commemorate an earlier HMCS Ottawa which had been sunk. After working up at Tobermory, she sailed for Canada, and was gifted to the Canadians on 15 June. Ottawa became the senior ship of Escort Group C5 which worked between St. John's, Newfoundland, and Derry, Northern Ireland until May 1944 when she became the senior ship of the 11th Escort Group. The 11th consisted of the Canadian destroyers Kootenay, Chaudière, Gatineau, and St. Laurent and were tasked to protect the invasion forces for D-Day. On 6 July 1944, Ottawa, Kootenay, and the British frigate Statice sank U-678 off Beachy Head, Sussex. Ottawa and Chaudière sank U-621 on 16 August near La Rochelle and two days later they sank U-984 west of Brest.

Ottawa was refitted in St. John's between 12 October 1944 and 26 February 1945. On 11 March she collided with the Canadian minesweeper Stratford off Halifax and was under repair until 30 April. After the end of the war in May she ferried Canadian troops back to Canada until she was paid off on 31 October. Ottawa was sold to the International Iron and Metal Company in August 1946 and subsequently broken up.
