= Porto Rafti =

Porto Rafti (Limin Markopoulou) Πόρτο Ράφτη (Λιμήν Μαρκοπούλου)
- Settlement
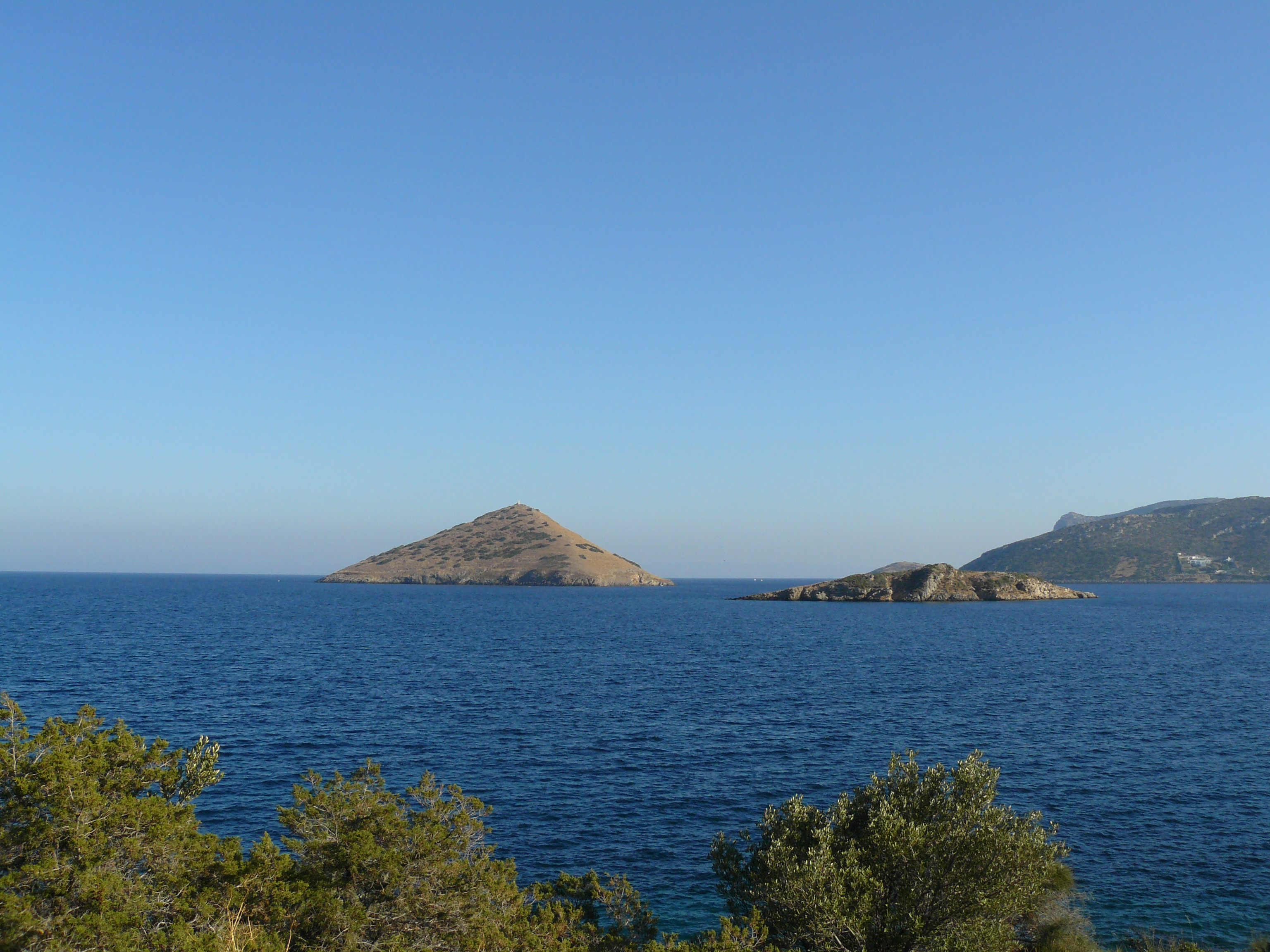
- View of Raftis Island and Raftopoula

- Location within Greece
- Coordinates: 37°53′13″N 24°00′15″E
- Country: Greece
- Administrative region: Attica
- Regional unit: East Attica
- Municipality: Markopoulo Mesogaias
- Elevation: 5 m (16 ft)

Population (2021)
  - Total: 10,526
- Time zone: UTC+2 (EET)
  - Summer (DST): UTC+3 (EEST)
- Postal code: 190 23
- Area code: 22990
- Vehicle registration: Z
- Website: www.markopoulo.gr

Porto Rafti (Greek: Πόρτο Ράφτη), officially named Limin Markopoulou (Λιμήν Μαρκοπούλου), is a seaside resort town located in East Attica, Greece.

Porto Rafti's main source of income is tourism and winemaking. It is part of the municipality of Markopoulo Mesogaias. In the 2011 census data, its permanent population was 9,686. Today, the permanent population is believed to be closer to 15,000, peaking at 100,000 every year during the summer season.

== Geography ==
The town of Porto Rafti stretches amphitheatrically around the Rafti Bay, a bay of the Aegean Sea, on the east coast of the Attica peninsula. It is surrounded by pine-cladded hills, the tallest of which is Merenta, 613 m above sea level. It is 5 km south of Vravrona, 6 km east of Markopoulo and 26 km southeast of the center of Athens.

== Climate ==
Porto Rafti has a hot-summer Mediterranean climate (Köppen climate classification: Csa). Porto Rafti experiences hot, dry summers and mild winters.

Climate data for Porto Rafti
Month	Jan	Feb	Mar	Apr	May	Jun	Jul	Aug	Sep	Oct	Nov	Dec	Year
Mean daily maximum °C (°F)	12.79 (55.02)	13.27 (55.89)	15.44 (59.79)	20.13 (68.23)	25.31 (77.56)	30.39 (86.70)	32.76 (90.97)	32.49 (90.48)	28.97 (84.15)	23.54 (74.37)	18.33 (64.99)	14.82 (58.68)	22.35 (72.23)
Daily mean °C (°F)	9.82 (49.68)	10.09 (50.16)	11.69 (53.04)	15.86 (60.55)	20.89 (69.60)	25.79 (78.42)	28.20 (82.76)	27.84 (82.11)	23.80 (74.84)	19.28 (66.70)	14.87 (58.77)	11.57 (52.83)	18.34 (65.01)
Mean daily minimum °C (°F)	6.66 (43.99)	6.72 (44.10)	7.80 (46.04)	10.84 (51.51)	14.44 (57.99)	19.29 (66.72)	21.73 (71.11)	21.57 (70.83)	18.87 (65.97)	14.90 (58.82)	11.52 (52.74)	8.42 (47.16)	13.80 (56.84)
Average precipitation mm (inches)	52.56 (2.07)	50.75 (2.00)	60.91 (2.40)	32.37 (1.27)	13.53 (0.53)	5.47 (0.22)	6.83 (0.27)	6.10 (0.24)	7.89 (0.31)	47.83 (1.88)	66.30 (2.61)	71.01 (2.80)	421.55 (16.60)
Mean monthly sunshine hours	129.37	134.15	174.88	219.70	283.14	343.84	352.03	334.73	271.39	198.73	130.33	107.54	2,705.5
Source: Hellenic National Meteorological Service

== History ==
The port was a major trading place until the collapse of the Roman Empire. The names of the ancient villages around the bay of Porto Rafti were Steiria, Prasiai, and Koroni. They belonged to the paraktia (seaside) Pandionis phyle, according to the division of the Ancient Athenian Democracy by Clisthenes in the early 5th century BCE. The port of Porto Rafti is no longer in use as a commercial harbor due to environmental concerns, but it has an organized marina for smaller recreational vessels with seaside restaurants and cafes. This port was the scene of the allied troops' evacuation after the German invasion in Greece at the end of April 1941.

== Name ==
A newer theory has developed around the name Rafter, which is associated with the worship of the goddess Rhea throughout Eastern Attica, and owes its origin to this root from which the name derives, see Ρ[ε]α-[εαυτής]φτης(R[ea]-[herself]ftis. K.Christodoulatos (2020)

== Churches ==
"St. Spiridonos Church" Greek Orthodox Church which is situated on south end of Piratis Mountain, just on the coast of a major beach, Agios Spyridonas, that is named after the church. It is one of the oldest churches in the area.

"Saint Marina" Church Greek Orthodox Church is another scenic seaside church, on the other side of Porto Rafti. Again, the beach, Agia Marina, is named after the church. An inscription on the front of the church mentions it was established on June 20, 1949.

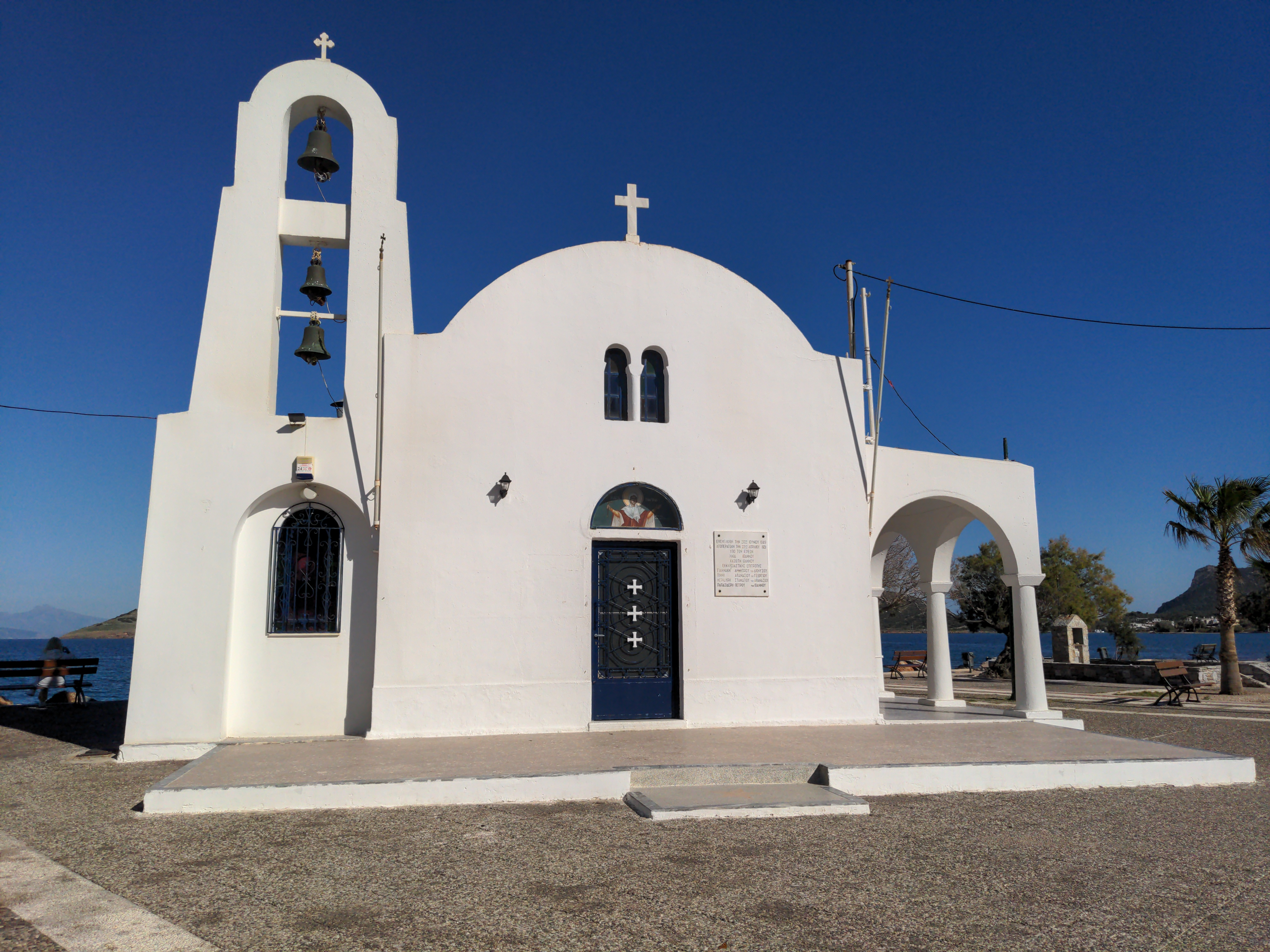
Front of Agia Marina Church

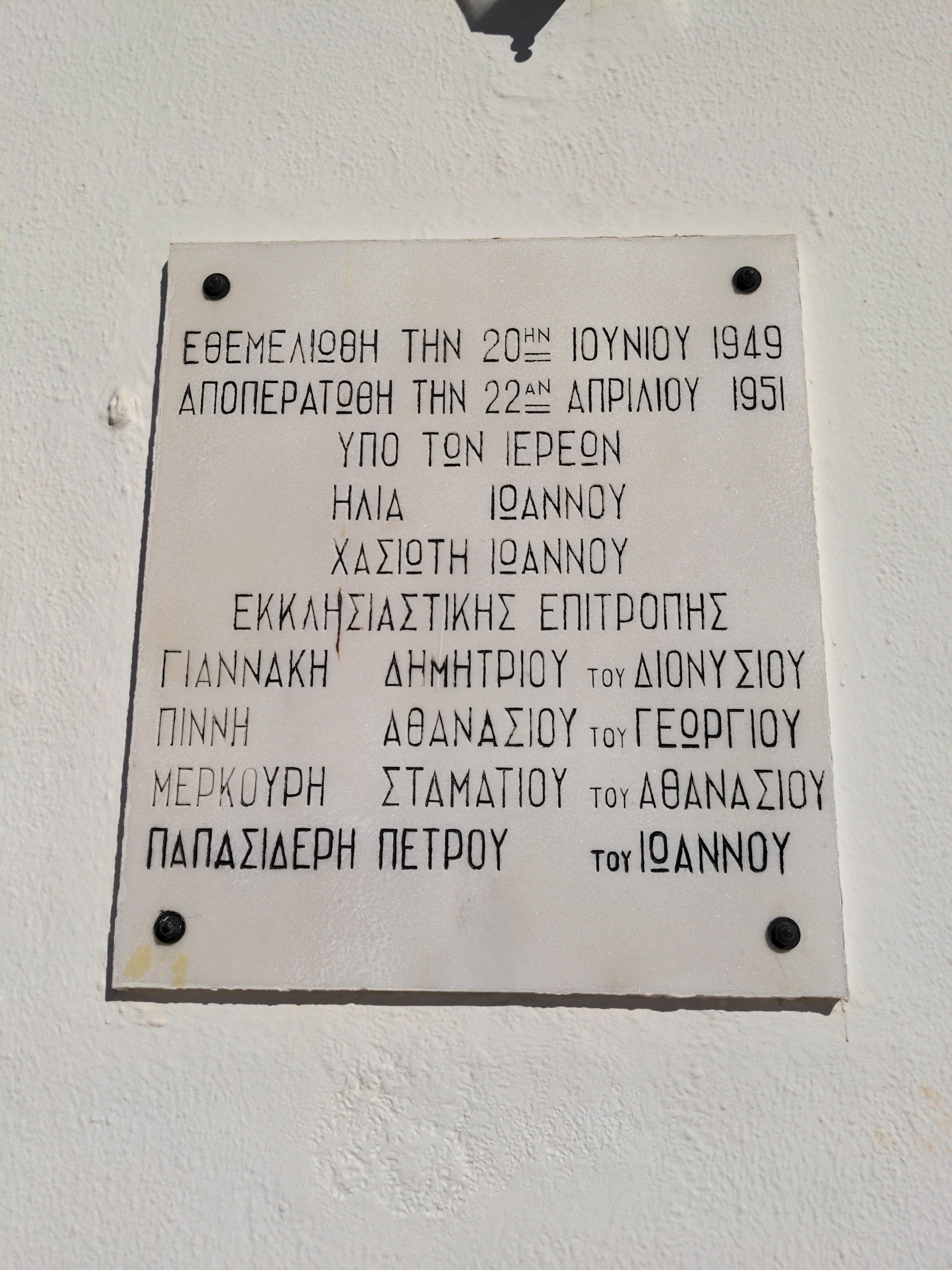
Inscription on the front of Agia Marina Church

== Tourism ==
Porto Rafti attracts visitors as a seaside resort, with beaches at Agios Spyridonas, Erotospilia and Avlaki, and an organized municipal beach at Avlaki.

== Historic population ==
Historical population
Year	Pop.	±%
1991	2,244	—
2001	5,148	+129.4%
2011	9,686	+88.2%
2021	10,526	+8.7%
