= HMS Isis (D87) =

Destroyer of the Royal Navy

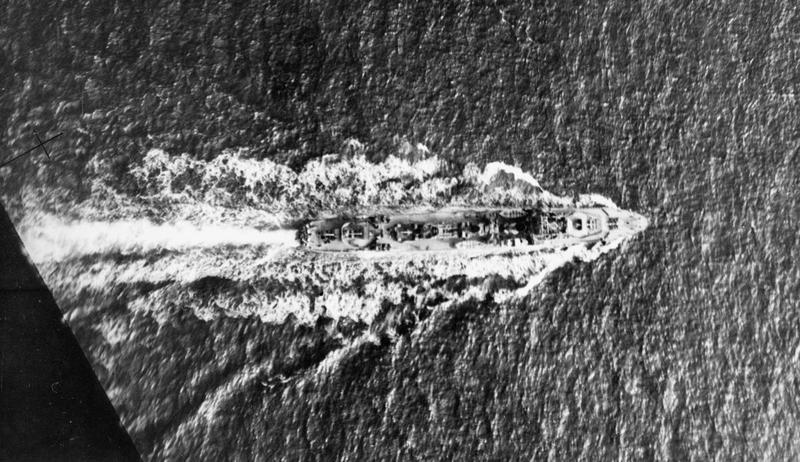
- An aerial view of HMS Isis underway during the Second World War

History

United Kingdom
- Name: Isis
- Namesake: Isis
- Builder: Yarrow Shipbuilders
- Laid down: 6 February 1936
- Launched: 12 November 1936
- Commissioned: 2 June 1937
- Identification: Pennant number: D87, I87
- Fate: Sunk by a mine off Normandy, 20 July 1944

General characteristics (as built)
- Class & type: I-class destroyer
- Displacement: 1,370 long tons (1,390 t) (standard); 1,888 long tons (1,918 t) (deep load)
- Length: 323 ft (98.5 m)
- Beam: 33 ft (10.1 m)
- Draught: 12 ft 6 in (3.8 m)
- Installed power: 3 Admiralty 3-drum boilers; 34,000 shp (25,000 kW)
- Propulsion: 2 shafts, 2 geared steam turbines
- Speed: 35.5 knots (65.7 km/h; 40.9 mph)
- Range: 5,500 nmi (10,200 km; 6,300 mi) at 15 knots (28 km/h; 17 mph)
- Complement: 145
- Sensors & processing systems: ASDIC
- Armament: 4 × single 4.7 in (120 mm) guns; 2 × quadruple 0.5-inch (12.7 mm) machine guns; 2 × quintuple 21 in (533 mm) torpedo tubes; 1 × rack and 2 throwers for 16 depth charges

Service record
- Operations: Battle of Greece (1941)
- Victories: Sank German submarine U-562 (1943)

HMS Isis was one of nine I-class destroyers built for the Royal Navy during the 1930s.

== Description ==
The I-class ships were improved versions of the preceding H-class. They displaced 1,370 long tons (1,390 t) at standard load and 1,888 long tons (1,918 t) at deep load. The ships had an overall length of 323 feet (98.5 m), a beam of 33 feet (10.1 m) and a draught of 12 feet 6 inches (3.8 m). They were powered by two Parsons geared steam turbines, each driving one propeller shaft, using steam provided by three Admiralty three-drum boilers. The turbines developed a total of 34,000 shaft horsepower (25,000 kW) and were intended to give a maximum speed of 35.5 knots (65.7 km/h; 40.9 mph). Isis reached a speed of 35.3 knots (65.4 km/h; 40.6 mph) from 33,849 shp (25,241 kW) during her sea trials. The ships carried enough fuel oil to give them a range of 5,500 nautical miles (10,200 km; 6,300 mi) at 15 knots (28 km/h; 17 mph). Their crew numbered 145 officers and ratings.

The ships mounted four 4.7-inch (120 mm) Mark IX guns in single mounts, designated 'A', 'B', 'X' and 'Y' from bow to stern. For anti-aircraft (AA) defence, they had two quadruple mounts for the 0.5 inch Vickers Mark III machine gun. The I class was fitted with two above-water quintuple torpedo tube mounts amidships for 21-inch (533 mm) torpedoes. One depth charge rack and two throwers were fitted; 16 depth charges were originally carried, but this increased to 35 shortly after the war began. The I-class ships were fitted with the ASDIC sound detection system to locate submarines underwater.

== Construction and career ==
Isis, named for the Egyptian goddess, was laid down by the Yarrow and Company, at Scotstoun in Glasgow on 6 February 1936, launched on 12 November 1936 and commissioned on 2 June 1937. Isis took part in the evacuation of Greece in April 1941. On 19 February 1943 she and the escort destroyer HMS Hursley and a Vickers Wellington medium bomber attacked and sank the German submarine U-562 in the Mediterranean Sea north-east of Benghazi.

Isis was hit in 1941 off Beirut, Lebanon after the Battle of Crete. She pursued two Vichy French destroyers which escaped. A Junkers Ju 88 aircraft then attacked and severely damaged her. Hero attempted to tow her to Haifa, Palestine. The tow rope snapped, however the engines were restarted and she successfully reached Haifa.

Isis struck a mine and sank on 20 July 1944 at the position 49°27′N 0°41′W in channel 'T' off the western sector of the Normandy landing beaches. She was the last interwar standard destroyer lost in the war, with eleven officers and 143 ratings lost.

== Bibliography ==
- Colledge, J. J.; Warlow, Ben (2006) [1969]. Ships of the Royal Navy: The Complete Record of All Fighting Ships of the Royal Navy from the 15th Century to the Present (3rd Rev ed.). London: Chatham Publishing. ISBN 978-1-86176-281-8. OCLC 67375475.
- English, John (1993). Amazon to Ivanhoe: British Standard Destroyers of the 1930s. Kendal, England: World Ship Society. ISBN 0-905617-64-9.
- Friedman, Norman (2006). British Destroyers & Frigates: The Second World War and After. Annapolis, Maryland: Naval Institute Press. ISBN 1-86176-137-6.
- Hodges, Peter & Friedman, Norman (1979). Destroyer Weapons of World War 2. Greenwich: Conway Maritime Press. ISBN 978-0-85177-137-3.
- Lenton, H. T. (1998). British & Empire Warships of the Second World War. Annapolis, Maryland: Naval Institute Press. ISBN 1-55750-048-7.
- March, Edgar J. (1966). British Destroyers: A History of Development, 1892-1953; Drawn by Admiralty Permission From Official Records & Returns, Ships' Covers & Building Plans. London: Seeley Service. OCLC 164893555.
- Rohwer, Jürgen (2005). Chronology of the War at Sea 1939–1945: The Naval History of World War Two (Third Revised ed.). Annapolis, Maryland: Naval Institute Press. ISBN 1-59114-119-2.
- Whitley, M. J. (1988). Destroyers of World War Two: An International Encyclopedia. Annapolis, Maryland: Naval Institute Press. ISBN 0-87021-326-1.
