= HMS Orion (85) =

Leander-class cruiser

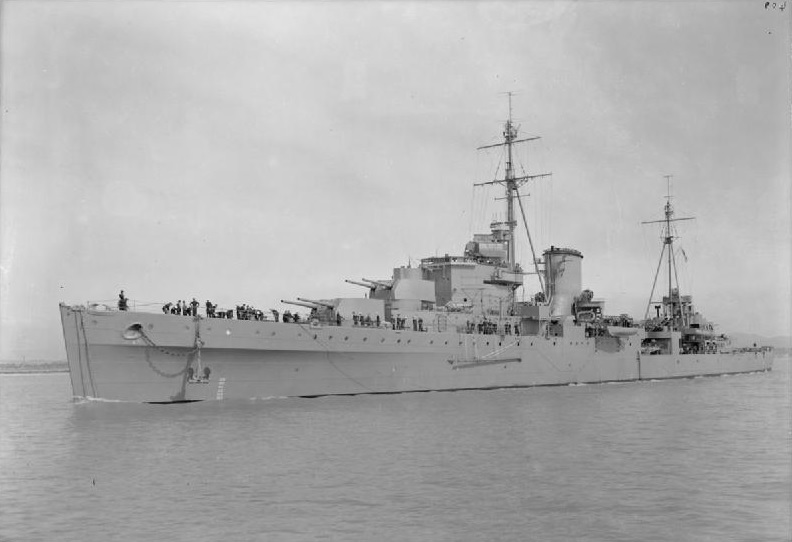
- HMS Orion

History

United Kingdom
- Name: HMS Orion
- Builder: Devonport Dockyard
- Laid down: 26 September 1931
- Launched: 24 November 1932
- Commissioned: 18 January 1934
- Decommissioned: 1947
- Identification: Pennant number: 85
- Fate: Sold for scrap 19 July 1949

General characteristics
- Class & type: Leander-class light cruiser
- Displacement: 7,270 tons standard; 9,740 tons full load
- Length: 554.9 ft (169.1 m)
- Beam: 56 ft (17 m)
- Draught: 19.1 ft (5.8 m)
- Installed power: 72,000 shaft horsepower (54,000 kW)
- Propulsion: Four Parsons geared steam turbines; Six Admiralty 3-drum oil-fired boilers; Four shafts
- Speed: 32.5 knots (60 km/h)
- Range: 5,730 nm at 13 knots
- Complement: Peacetime 550; Wartime 680
- Sensors & processing systems: type 284/286 air search radar; type 273/271 surface search; type 285 6 inch (152 mm) fire control; type 282 40 mm fire control
- Armament: Original configuration: 8 × BL 6 inch Mk XXIII naval guns; 4 × 4-inch (102 mm) guns; 12 × 0.5 in machine guns; 8 × 21 in torpedo tubes; In 1945: 8 × 6 in (152 mm); 8 × 4 in (102 mm); 16 × 40 mm; 8 × 21 inch (533 mm) torpedo tubes (quadruple mounts)
- Armour: 4 in (102 mm) main belt; 2.5 in (64 mm) ends; 1.25 to 2 in (32 to 51 mm) deck; 1 in (25 mm) turrets
- Aircraft carried: One catapult-launched aircraft; Original type was a Fairey Seafox (K8571 shown in a 1937 photograph, and K8573 in a 1938 photograph); Catapult and aircraft later replaced with Supermarine Walrus

HMS Orion was a Leander-class light cruiser which served with distinction in the Royal Navy during the Second World War. She received 13 battle honours, a record only exceeded by HMS Warspite and matched by two others.

== History ==
Orion was built by Devonport Dockyard in Plymouth with machinery from Vickers-Armstrongs in Newcastle-on-Tyne. Orion was commissioned on 18 January 1934, for service with the Home Fleet but she was transferred to the America and West Indies Station, based at the Royal Naval Dockyard on Ireland Island, in the Imperial fortress colony of Bermuda, in 1937 where she was with the 8th Cruiser Squadron. She arrived at Bermuda on the 3rd of September, 1937. Around 19:15 on the 21st of September, while exercising off Bermuda, Orion was ordered, in response to a request from the United States Consul for assistance, to make its way towards the position of the sail training ship USS Annapolis, four hundred miles from Bermuda at 35 degrees North and 54 degrees West.

Cadet Robert Hugh Quinn, aboard Annapolis, required an immediate operation for appendicitis and the 7 knot speed of Annapolis would not enable it to reach Bermuda in time. The two ships were in sight of each other by 0858 on the 22nd of September. After Captain Hines of the Annapolis came aboard to meet with the captain of Orion, HRG Kinahan, Orion set off for Bermuda by 1038 with the American cadet, entering through the Narrows channel at night and arriving at the dockyard at 0246 on the 23rd of September, from where Quinn was delivered to the Royal Naval Hospital.

On the 27th of October, 1937, the Flag of the America and West Indies Station was transferred to Orion when HMS York was sent to Trinidad due to civil unrest there, leaving the Commander-in-Chief at Admiralty House, Bermuda. Orion remained temporary flagship until HMS York returned on the 21st of November, 1937. On the 15th of November, the ocean liner MV Reina del Pacifico, which operated between Liverpool and Valparaíso, Chile, via Bermuda, the West Indies and the Panama Canal, stopped at Bermuda on its way to Chile with the body of former Prime Minister Ramsay MacDonald who had died aboard on the 9 November. MacDonald's body was transferred to the navy for return to Plymouth. All of the cruisers of the station were away from Bermuda at that moment except for Orion and HMS Apollo. As Apollo was undergoing a refit at the dockyard, it would have fallen to Orion to deliver MacDonald's body, but as flagship she could not leave the station. Apollo was consequently hurried through her refit instead.

Orion was tasked with the memorial service for MacDonald, whose body was taken aboard the Royal Navy tug Sandboy once the Reina del Pacifico was in Bermudian waters and landed on Front Street in the City of Hamilton along with the dockyard Chaplain, the Orion's Chaplain, an Honour Guard, sentries and coffin bearers. MacDonald's coffin was borne on a gun carriage to the Church of England's Cathedral of the Most Holy Trinity, in a procession that included the ship's company of Orion and a detachment of the Sherwood Foresters (Nottinghamshire and Derbyshire Regiment), serving in the Bermuda Garrison and based at Prospect Camp. At the cathedral, Arthur Browne, the Bishop of Bermuda, conducted the memorial service, which was followed by a lying in state. The following day, the procession was repeated back to the Sandboy which bore MacDonald's body to Apollo at the dockyard, which departed Bermuda for Plymouth at 1100, also carrying MacDonald's daughter, Miss Sheila MacDonald. Orion conveyed the ashes of Lord Tweedsmuir, Governor General of Canada, back to England in February 1940.

In June 1940 she was transferred to the Mediterranean, where she was with the 7th Cruiser Squadron as John Tovey's flagship. She took part in the bombardment of Bardia, and the Battle of Calabria in July 1940. Late in that month, she sank the small Greek freighter Ermioni which was ferrying supplies to the Italian-held Dodecanese islands. During the rest of 1940 she escorted Malta convoys and transported troops to Greece. In the early part of 1941 she was in the Crete and Aegean areas and was also at the Battle of Cape Matapan in March 1941.

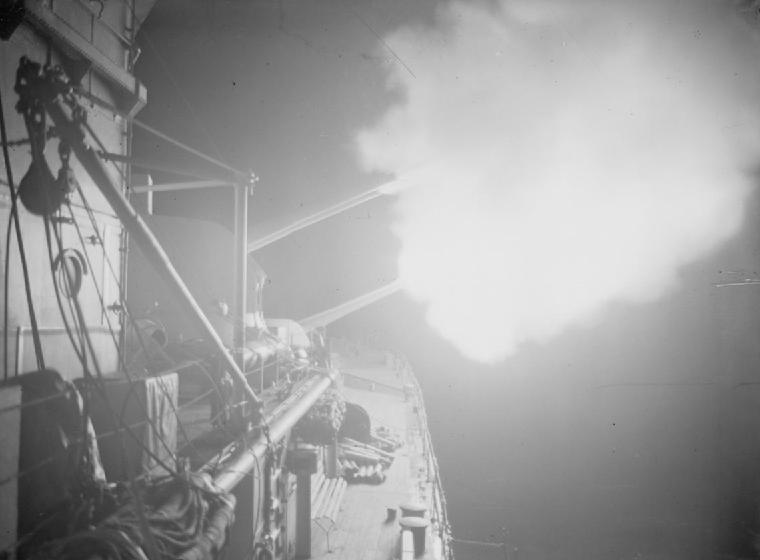
Flashes from the 6-inch guns of Orion can be seen against the darkness during a night bombardment of enemy positions on the Garigliano River.

During an attack on a German convoy headed for Crete on 22 May, she was damaged in a duel with its escort, the Italian torpedo boat Lupo. On 29 May 1941, during the evacuation of Crete, she was bombed and badly damaged while transporting 1900 evacuated troops. Around 360 people died, of whom 100 were soldiers. Orion reported damage from friendly fire as the cruisers tried to hit Lupo. After extensive damage control had been undertaken she limped to Alexandria at 12 knots (22 km/h; 14 mph), providing a spectacular sight in the harbour with the mast wedged into the ship's funnel and significant battle damage. On 29 June Orion sailed for passage to Simonstown, South Africa via Aden for temporary repairs and then sent to the Mare Island Naval Shipyard in Vallejo, California for major repairs.

Orion's repairs were completed in March 1942 and she returned initially to Plymouth where new radar was installed. During mid 1942, she was widely employed, in home waters and on convoy escort duties to Africa and the Indian Ocean.

Orion returned to the Mediterranean in October 1942. This time she was with the 15th Cruiser Squadron. She was involved in convoy escort duties and supported the army in the invasion of Sicily. She spent most of the rest of the war around the Mediterranean. James Gornall the former English first-class cricketer, promoted to Captain in 1941 was placed in command of her in 1943. She also took part in the Normandy Landings in June 1944, where she fired the first shell.

=== Corfu Channel Incident ===
Orion was involved in the Corfu Channel Incident in 1946, a conflict between Britain and Albania involving the navigation of British ships in the channel between the Greek island of Corfu and the Albanian coast.

=== Fate ===
Orion ended service in 1947, was sold for scrap to Arnott Young (Dalmuir, Scotland) on 19 July 1949 and was scrapped in August 1949.

== Battle honours ==
- Atlantic 1939;
- Calabria 1940, Mediterranean 1940-43-44;
- Malta Convoys 1941, Matapan 1941, Greece 1941, Crete 1941;
- Sicily 1943, Salerno 1943;
- Aegean 1944, Anzio 1944, Normandy 1944, South France 1944.

Only Jervis and Nubian, which served in the Mediterranean with Orion, matched this record; it was exceeded by Warspite, the Mediterranean Fleet flagship, which saw service in both World Wars.
