= Fort Lisse =

WW2-era fort on the Metaxas Line in Greece

Coordinates: 41.306°N 23.858°E

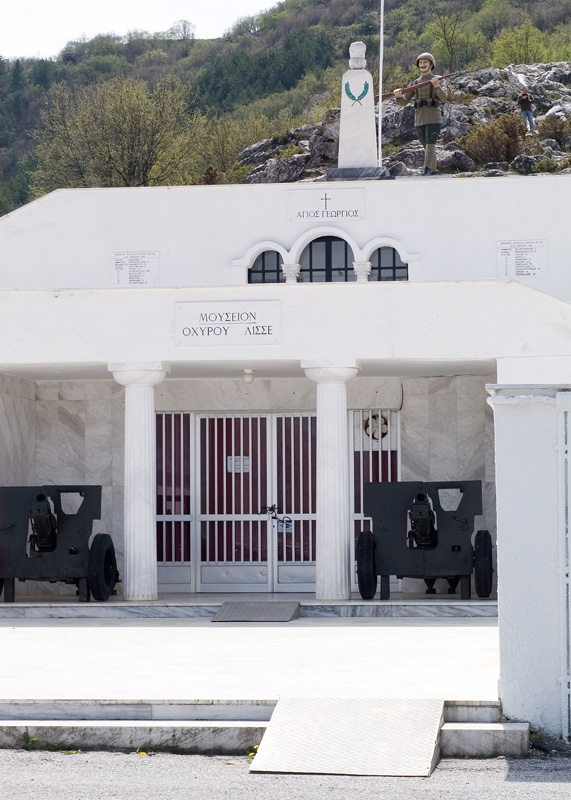
External view

Fort Lisse (Greek: Οχυρό Λίσσε) is one of the World War II-era fortifications of the Metaxas Line, along Greece's northern border in Eastern Macedonia. It is a short distance from the village of Ochyro, some 2 km from the town of Kato Nevrokopi. At this fort the Greek army held out bravely against attacks by German divisions on 6–7 April 1941, during the German invasion of Greece. In memory of this battle a memorial has been erected and a small museum has been built. This museum has recently been renovated and re-opened its doors to the public in 2002.

The museum’s exhibits include firearms (revolvers, pistols, rifles, machine-guns, hand grenades etc.) belonging to the Greek and German armies, uniforms, medals, various personal belongings of soldiers and officers, and a 1941 map detailing the Battle of the Forts. In the courtyard there is artillery that was used to defend the forts.

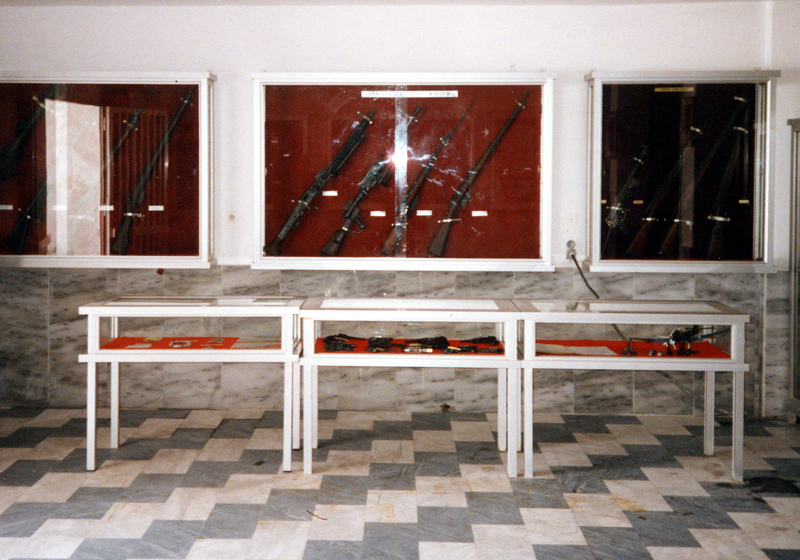
Interior view 1

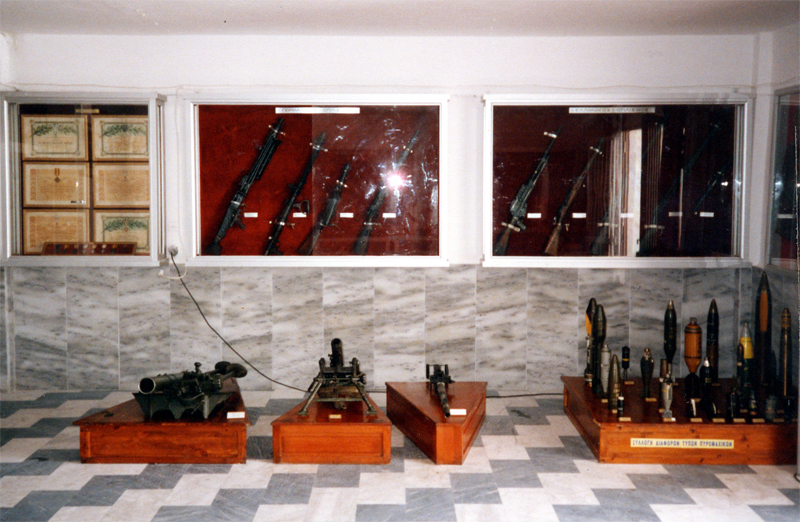
Interior view 2

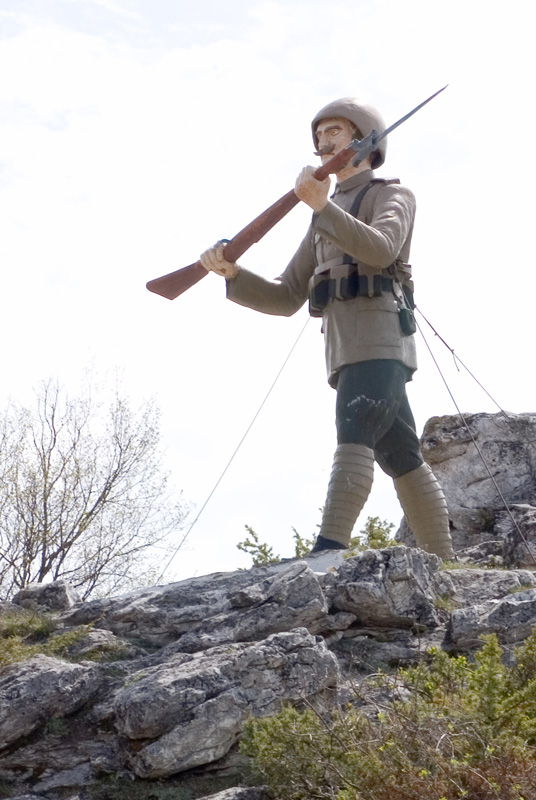
Metal statue of Greek soldier

== Sources ==
- The original version of this article was taken from the corresponding article at the Museums of Macedonia website, commissioned by the Macedonian Heritage foundation, written by Vlasis Vlasidis, and published under a CC-BY-SA-3.0 license.
