= Fort Roupel =

Border fortress in northern Greece

Coordinates: 41.346°N 23.371°E

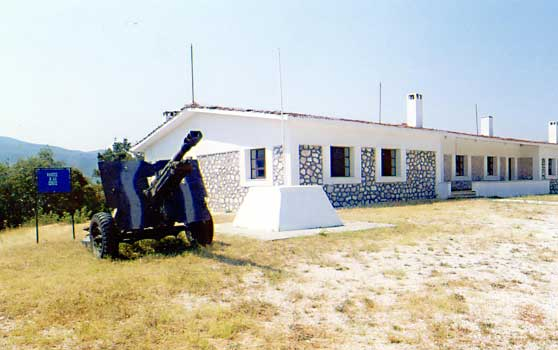
External view

Fort Roupel (Greek: Οχυρό Ρούπελ) is a fortress at the north border of Central Macedonia, Greece, built in 1914. It became part of the fortifications of the Metaxas Line in the 1930s and became famous for its defence during the German invasion of Greece in April 1941.

The Roupel fortifications are not far from the Serres-Promachonas national road, which leads to the Greek-Bulgarian border. They are just a short distance from the border in the narrow Roupel Gorge, through which the Strymon River flows. This place is strategically important for entry to Greek or Bulgarian territory and was fortified in 1914.

During World War I, on 23 May 1916, the royal Greek government of Athens permitted the surrender of the fortress to the Germans and their Bulgarian allies as a counterbalance to the Allied forces that had been established in Thessaloniki. The German-Bulgarian troops then proceeded to occupy most of eastern Macedonia without resistance. This act led to the outbreak of a revolt of Venizelist Army officers in Thessaloniki and the establishment of the Provisional Government of National Defence under Entente auspices there, opposed to the official government of Athens and King Constantine I, cementing the so-called "National Schism". The Entente regarded the unconditional surrender of the fort as a violation of Greek neutrality, contrary to what the king advocated. They pressured him to supply war materials equal in value to what had been lost through the surrender. However, the king's refusal to comply led to brief skirmish in Athens, known as the Noemvriana, followed by a food embargo on the city that continued until his abdication.

The Battles at the Forts of Rupel and Beles, 6–9 April 1941

The fort also became famous during World War II, when the advance of the German armies on that front sector was halted here. On the eve of World War II, Fort Roupel was incorporated into the Metaxas Line, a new line of defence that was built to repel an invasion of Greece from Bulgaria. For three days, the fort held out against German attack and was abandoned by its men only after the surrender of the Greek army in Thessaloniki.

Today one of the fortification's galleries is open to visitors, as is a small museum and pavilion for visitors, the observatory and the memorial of fallen soldiers. In the gallery, the visitor has the opportunity to feel the moments of the battle. Walking the wards and in the side aisles, some dioramas depict the Greek fighters' battle forts – gunner, doctors caring for the injured, the sergeant in his office and the office of the captain, and more.

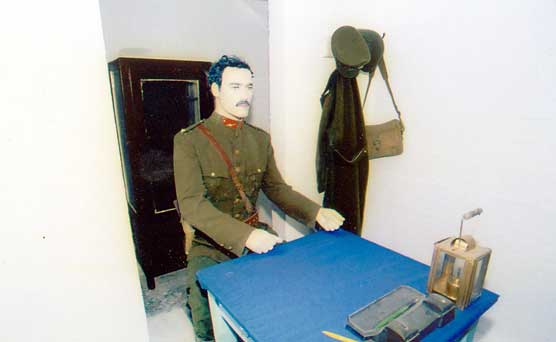
Model of a sergeant

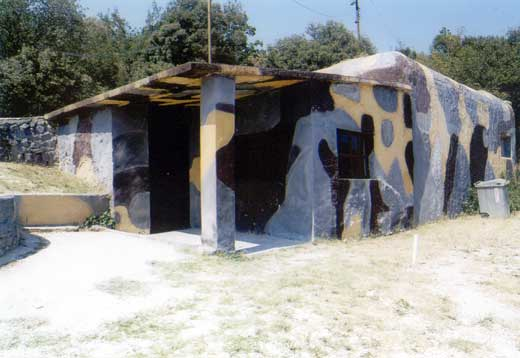
Entrance of visitable tunnel

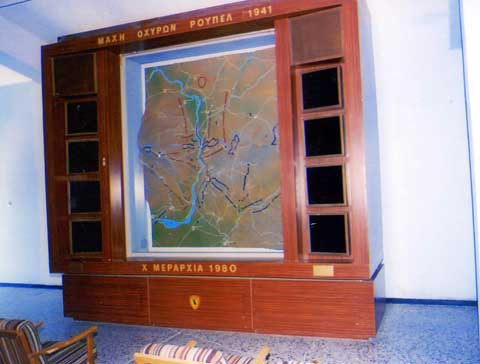
Map of the battle for the fort in April 1941

== Sources ==
- Koliopoulos, John S.; Veremis, Thanos M. [in Greek] (2009). Modern Greece A History Since 1821. Oxford: Wiley-Blackwell. ISBN 978-1-4443-1483-0.
- The original version of this article was taken from the corresponding article at the Museum of Roupel.
