= Metaxas Line =

Former fortifications on the Greco-Bulgarian border

- Northeastern Greece
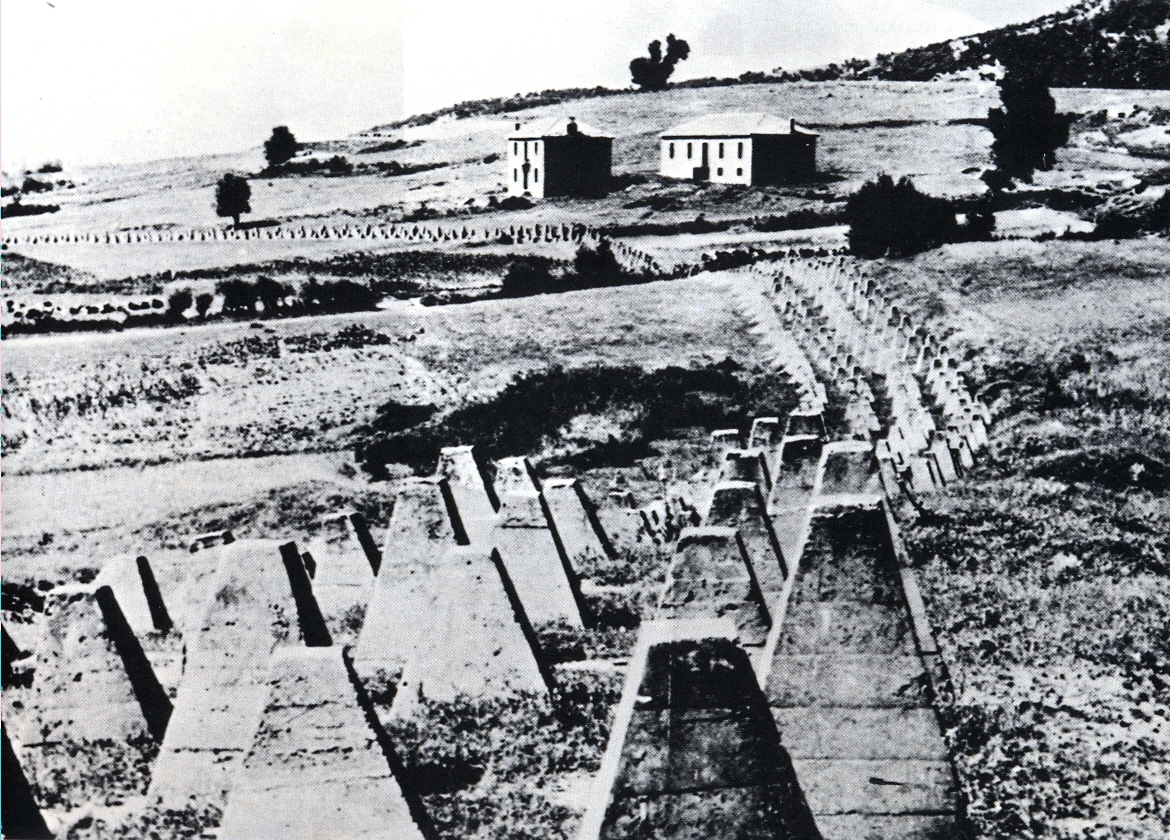
- Dragon's teeth along the Metaxas line, near the Greek–Bulgarian border

Site information
- Type: Defensive line
- Controlled by: Greece
- Open to the public: Yes

Site history
- Built: 1936–1941
- In use: 1936–1945
- Materials: Concrete and steel
- Battles/wars: Battle of Greece in World War II: Battle of the Metaxas Line (1941)

The Metaxas Line (Greek: Γραμμή Μεταξά, Grammi Metaxa) was a chain of fortifications constructed along the line of the Greco-Bulgarian border, designed to protect Greece in case of a Bulgarian invasion after the rearmament of Bulgaria. It was named after Ioannis Metaxas, then Prime Minister of Greece, and chiefly consists of tunnels that led to observatories, emplacements and machine gun nests. The constructions are so sturdy that they survive to this day, some of which are still in active service. Some of them are open to the public.

The Metaxas Line consists of 21 independent fortification complexes, the largest of which is Fort Roupel as it covers 6.1 out of the 155 km of the full line and had been constructed at a height of 322 m. Illumination was initially mostly provided by oil-lamps, although generators were also installed. Currently, the fortifications are supplied with public electricity, but they are also equipped with generators. Ventilation was achieved both naturally and artificially. Water was supplied via water-mains. The fortification works lasted four years and their cost at the time reached 100,400,000 drachmas.

== List of fortification complexes ==
The following 21 forts make up the Metaxas Line, ordered from West to East along the Greco-Bulgarian border.

1. Popotlivitsa (Ποποτλίβιτσα)
2. Istimpei (Ιστίμπεη)
3. Kelkagia (Κελκαγιά)
4. Arpalouki (Αρπαλούκι)
5. Paliouriones (Παληουριώνες)
6. Roupel (Ρούπελ)
7. Karatas (Καρατάς)
8. Kali (Κάλη)
9. Persek (Περσέκ)
10. Mpampazora (Μπαμπαζώρα)
11. Maliagka (Μαλιάγκα)
12. Perithori (Περιθώρι)
13. Partalouska (Παρταλούσκα)
14. Ntasavli (Ντάσαβλη)
15. Lisse (Λίσσε)
16. Pyramidoeides (Πυραμιδοειδές)
17. Kastilo (Καστίλο)
18. Agios Nikolaos (Άγιος Νικόλαος)
19. Mpartiseva (Μπαρτίσεβα)
20. Echinos (Εχίνος)
21. Nymfaia (Νυμφαία)

== History ==
Before the outbreak of World War II, the additions made to the Roupel Fortress were considered to be too weak. Thus, it was decided that further fortifications should be constructed, not only in that particular region, but also along the entire northern Greek borderline. The plans were drawn up in 1935 and work began at Kerkini in 1936. The original intention was that the full fortifications' line reach as far along the border as Ormenion. Greece, however, became involved in World War II in 1940, thus preventing completion. At the war's outbreak, the fortification line had only reached Komotini, Thrace and was 155 km long.

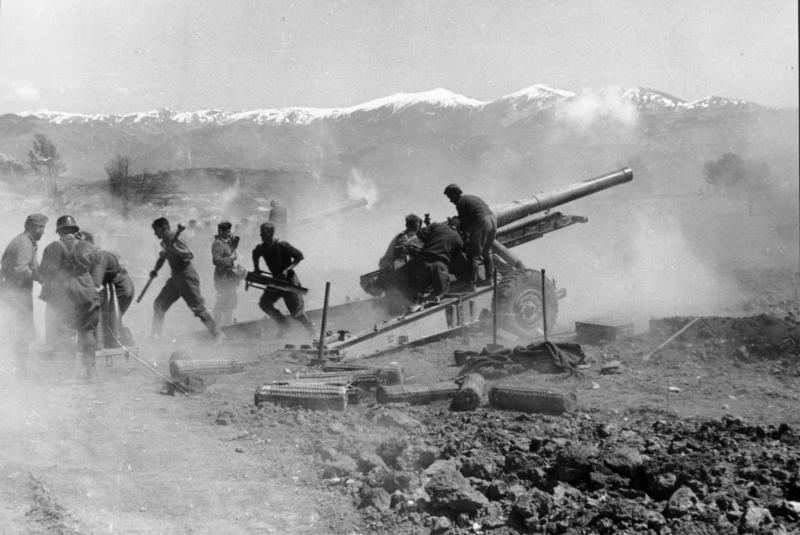
German artillery shelling the Metaxas Line.

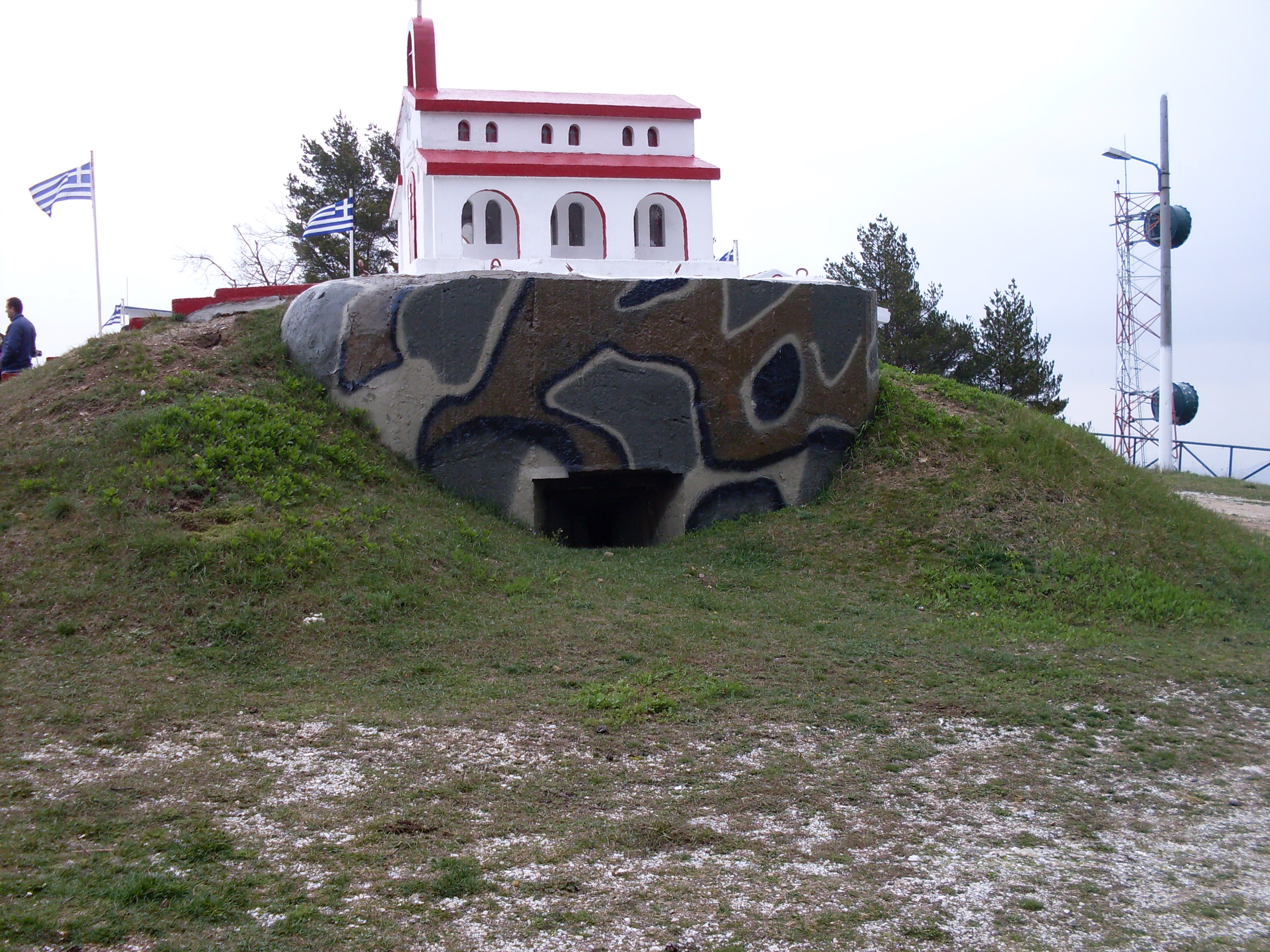
Istimpei fortification, Metaxas Line, machine gun post

The Battles at the Forts of Rupel and Beles, 6–9 April 1941

Like the Maginot Line on the Franco-German border, the Metaxas Line was outflanked by German forces specifically when the Germans invaded Greece in April 1941 through Yugoslavia. The German XVIII Mountain Corps and XXX Army Corps attacked the Metaxas Line before dawn on 6 April, but they encountered fierce resistance under the leadership of Brig. General Konstantinos Th. Bakopoulos, and after three days of fighting they had only limited successes. The 2nd Panzerdivision XVIII Mountain Corps with an enveloping move crossed the Yugoslavian borders, overcame Yugoslav and Greek resistance and captured Thessaloniki on 9 April. The capture of Thessaloniki forced the Greek East Macedonia Army Section to surrender on 10 April and the Metaxas Line battle was over.

German General Wilhelm List, who led the attack against the Metaxas Line, admired the bravery and courage of these soldiers. He refrained from taking the Greek soldiers prisoner and declared that the army was free to leave with their war flags, on condition that they surrender their arms and supplies. He also ordered his soldiers and officers to salute the Greek soldiers (Beevor 2005, p. 20). There were few troops to defend the line as most of the Greek Army was fighting against the Italians on the Albanian front.

== See also ==
- Greco-Italian War
- 4th of August Regime
