= Fort Istimpei =

Border fortress in northern Greece

- Part of the Metaxas Line

Site information
- Type: Fort
- Owner: Greek Army
- Controlled by: Greece

Location
- Location within Greece
- Coordinates: 41.340°N 23.231°E

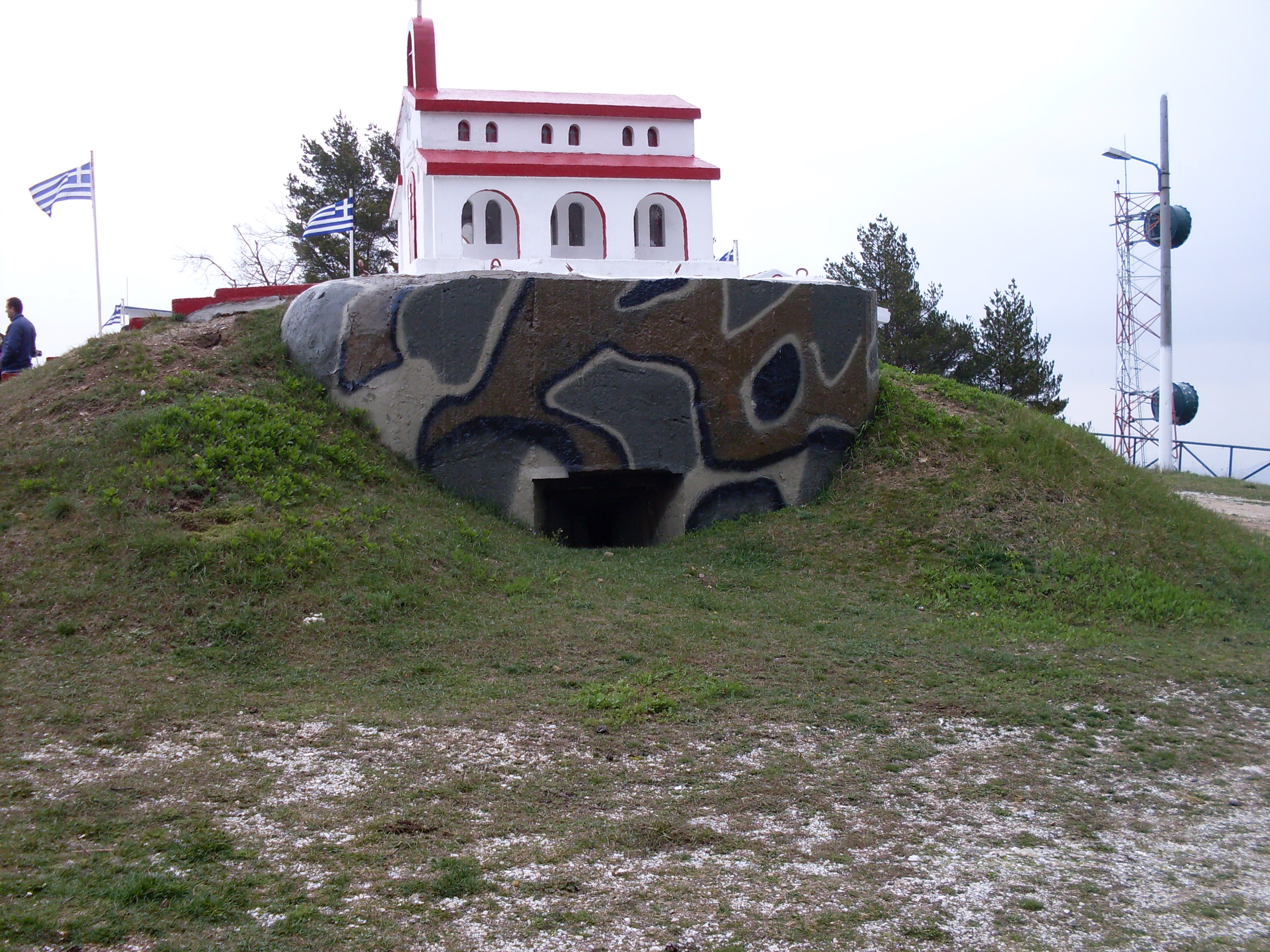
Istibey fortification, machine gun post

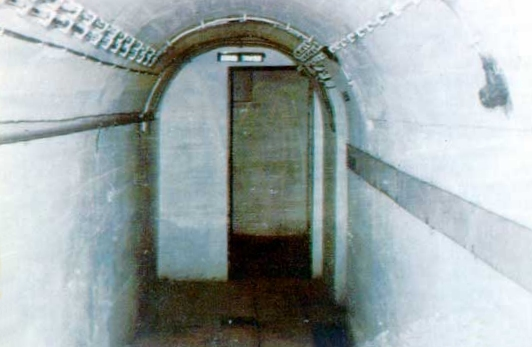
Entrance of the fortress

Fort Istimpei (Greek: Οχυρό Ιστίμπεη) is a fortress on Mount Beles, Central Macedonia, on Greece's northern border with Bulgaria, that was built to help defend Greece during World War II.

It became part of the fortifications of the Metaxas Line, a chain of fortifications along the Greek-Bulgarian border that was built in the 1930s and named after Ioannis Metaxas, then Prime Minister of Greece.

It is situated 16 km north of the village of Neo Petritsi at an altitude of 1,339 meters.

The main mission of the fort was to prevent entrance to the country from Bulgaria. It housed 13 officers and 350 soldiers. Its commander in chief was Ksanthos Pikoulakis.

The fort was active until April 1941, when it was forced to surrender to German troops.

In 1991 the Panhellenic Association of Combatants and Friends of the Forts of Macedonia and Thrace funded the construction of a small museum on this site in commemoration of its role in the Battle of the Forts in April 1941 against invading German forces.

Access to the museum is restricted: permission must be obtained from the military unit stationed at Neo Petritsi, which is four kilometres west off the Serres-Promachonas National road A25 (Kilkis junction). Foreign nationals must obtain a special permit from the Hellenic Army General Staff.

The battles around the Fort Istibey , 6-9 April 1941

The museum contains firearms (rifles, revolvers, pistols and machine-guns) belonging to the Greek and German armies, army uniforms of the time, various personal belongings of the defenders, as well as a map detailing the Battle of the Forts. During visits a film is also shown that tells the story of the battle at Fort Istimpei.

== Sources ==
- The original version of this article was taken from the corresponding article at the Museums of Macedonia website, commissioned by the Macedonian Heritage foundation, written by Vlasis Vlasidis, and published under a CC-BY-SA-3.0 license.
