= Italian auxiliary cruiser Barletta =

History

Italy
- Name: Barletta
- Laid down: March 1931
- Launched: 12 September 1931
- Completed: November 1931
- Fate: Scrapped January 1965

General characteristics
- Armament: 2 × 102 mm (4 in) /45 Mod. 1917 guns; 4 × 13.2 mm (0.52 in) machine-guns; 60 × naval mines

Barletta was an Italian cargo liner built during the 1930s and later became an auxiliary cruiser of the Regia Marina (Royal Navy) during World War II.

== History ==
Built between March and November 1931 in the Cantieri Riuniti dell'Adriatico of Monfalcone (construction and assembly number 248, completion number 208) together with her sister ships Adriatico, Brindisi, Brioni, Zara, Lero and Monte Gargano, the ship was originally a mixed motor vessel of 1,975 gross register tons (GRT) and 1069 net tonnage. Four holds with a capacity of 1,722 cubic metres (60,800 cu ft) allowed a deadweight of 1231 (or 1220, or 1240) tons, and the cabins had a capacity of 82 passengers (for other sources 68, or 22 in first class, 24 in second and 22 in third). Two FIAT diesel engines, with a total power of 3,300 metric horsepower (2,400 kW) (according to other sources 2,200 or 2,800 metric horsepower (1,600 or 2,100 kW)), consuming 11.5 tons of fuel (with a total stock of 1250 tons) per day, powered two propellers (according to other sources only one) allowing a speed of 14.5 knots (26.9 km/h; 16.7 mph) (according to other sources 14 or 15.8 knots (25.9 or 29.3 km/h; 16.1 or 18.2 mph)).

=== Civilian career ===
Registered with serial number 57 at the Maritime Compartment of Bari, the ship initially belonged to the Puglia Società anonima di Navigazione a Vapore (based in Bari). On 21 March 1932, the Puglia company merged with some other Adriatic shipping companies, to become the San Marco Navigation Company, based in Venice, which on 4 April of the same year became Compagnia Adriatica di Navigazione. The company later changed its name for the last time on 1 January 1937, to Adriatica Società Anonima di Navigazione. Barletta then followed these changes of owner, finally becoming part of the Adriatica fleet.

In her first years the ship was used for the transport of passengers and goods on the line n. 42, between the Italian Adriatic coast, Dalmatia and Albania.

The ship operated on behalf of Adriatica until 1936, when she was requisitioned by the Regia Marina (Royal Navy), armed for use as an auxiliary cruiser. According to some sources, however, the service continued until 7 March 1937. On 20 April 1937 the ship was deployed to Palma de Mallorca with the task of patrolling the Iberian coast, as part of the Spanish Civil War, alternating in this role with her sister Adriatico. On 24 May, while she was moored in Mallorca, Barletta was hit by a bomb during an air attack by the Republican Air Force; killing six wounding three others.

A few days later, at the end of May, the ship was escorted to La Spezia (where she arrived on 28 May) and underwent the necessary repairs. In August, she received the false name of Rio and, under Spanish flag, was deployed to Favignana, to prevent ships carrying supplies for the Spanish Republican troops to cross the Strait of Sicily.

As part of this task, on 31 August 1937, Barletta/Rio left her patrol area and intercepted and captured, the British-flagged Greek oil tanker SS Burlington north of the Strait of Messina and then her delivered to Francoist ships. On 21 September 1937, the ship ended her patrols in the Sicilian channel and from 10 November, was based at Tobruk to control the transit of Republican ships in the eastern basin of the Mediterranean. During the Spanish war, Barletta/Rio carried out a total of four surveillance/interception missions.

In 1938 the ship was returned to the Adriatica company and resumed the civil service, sailing on the lines 43 and 43 B, which linked the ports of Venice, Bari, Rhodes, and Smyrna, along with various cities in Greece, Albania, and Turkey.

From January to March 1939, Barletta was again requisitioned (or chartered) by the Regia Marina for use as a transport to Spain. She made six voyages (three from La Spezia to Cádiz and three from Genoa to Barcelona) and carrying a total of 857 men and 2172 tons of provisions for the civilian population.

On 25 March 1939 the ship resumed the service of transporting goods and passengers, but only for a short time; already on 6 April, she was again requisitioned for naval service. She left Brindisi for Durazzo and participated as a command ship in the operations for the occupation of Albania.

On 2 August of the same year the ship returned in civil service on the route Venice-Trieste-Brindisi-Bari-Lero-Calino-Coo-Rodi-Alessandria of Egypt.

=== World War II ===
==== 1940 ====
On 12 May 1940 Barletta was again requisitioned by the Regia Marina while in Durazzo. Enrolled on the same date in the role of the auxiliary naval ship of the state as an auxiliary cruiser, the vessel received the code D 16 and was converted for naval service, including an armament composed of two 102 mm (4 in) /45 Mod. 1917 guns, four 13.2 mm (0.52 in) machine-guns and ferroguides for the transport and the laying of 60 mines. The ship received the name code of Berlina.

On 6 June 1940, after the completion of the conversion works, the unit was employed as minelayer and carried out the laying of minefields off Gallipoli, Santa Maria di Leuca and Durazzo. On 10 June, date of Italy's entry in the Second World War, the Barletta was framed, as a minelayer, in the Gruppo Navi Ausiliarie Dipartimentali del Dipartimento Militare Marittimo "Jonio e Basso Adriatico", based in Taranto. Between 6 June and the beginning of July the Barletta, together with the minelayer Vieste, the elderly cruiser Taranto and the old destroyers Carlo Mirabello and Augusto Riboty, participated in the laying of 37 minefields for a total of 2335 mines, including 28 anti-submarine mines, in the waters of the Gulf of Taranto, the Lower Adriatic and Albania. On 7 July the ship left Brindisi and, sent to Libya, began laying new minefields, this time in the waters of Benghazi and Tripoli, returning to Italy on 12 August. During these operations (especially in Tobruk) the ship, together with the destroyers Turbine, Nembo, Euro and Aquilone, laid 14 minefields for a total of 540 devices.

On 20 August the ship was assigned to the newly formed Commando Superiore Traffico Albania (Maritrafalba) and was tasked to escort troop convoys to Albania.

Starting from 5 September 1940, Barletta began to escort convoys; at first she was employed on the Bari-Durazzo route with occasional escorts to Tobruk and Benghazi in North Africa, the auxiliary cruiser was then used also in the waters of Greece and the Aegean Sea.

On 24 December, the ship left Brindisi and, along with the torpedo boat Andromeda, escorted a convoy of the troop ships Firenze, Argentina, and Italia and the transport Narenta to Vlora. At 12:25 the convoy, which was about twenty miles from Saseno, was attacked by the Greek submarine Papanikolis. She launched a torpedo against Barletta, which, having sighted the weapon in time, was able to avoid it by quickly turning to port. At 13:20, however, Firenze was torpedoed by Papanikolis in position 40°34' N and 19°02' E and began to sink a dozen miles west/northwest of Saseno. Barletta recovered 874 men, and Andromeda saved another 29, out of a total of 996 embarked aboard Firenze; fatalities amounted to 93 men. Barletta reported some damage to nine ships during the rescue operations, while Firenze, abandoned adrift, sank in the night of 24/25 December.

==== 1941 ====
Barletta went into dock for repairs to damage sustained during the convoy before returning to active service in January 1941. That month, she got underway for another operation but accidentally collided with the steamer Merano. On 4 May, she joined the escort for another convoy, along with the torpedo boats Aretusa, Altair, and Antares. The escort group left Brindisi and escorted the convoy, which landed the Italian expeditionary force at Argostoli (Cefalonia).

In September 1941, Barletta was redeployed in Piraeus, Greece, to escort the merchant ships sailing in the Aegean Sea. During this period, she also carried out two missions to Tobruk. In mid-September, she escorted a convoy from Suda to Piraeus that included the transports Città di Livorno and Città di Marsala and the destroyers Francesco Crispi and Quintino Sella. While on the way on 19 September, the ships encountered the British submarine HMS Torbay. At 15:10, Torbay launched a spread of four torpedoes at a distance of about 3,600 m (11,800 ft), but five minutes later, lookouts aboard Crispi spotted the torpedo wakes and alerted the other ships, allowing them to evade the attack. The destroyers launched depth charges against Torbay but failed to inflict any damage.

On the afternoon of 19 October 1941, Barletta and the torpedo boats Lupo, Altair, and Monzambano sailed from Piraeus as escort for a convoy of four merchant ships (Città di Agrigento, Città di Marsala, Salzburg, Tagliamento) directed to Candia. That evening, at 19:30, Altair struck a mine in the Saronic Gulf that had been laid eleven days before by the British submarine Rorqual. Altair had her bow blown off and caught fire and was forced to stop. Barletta and Monzambano continued on with the rest of the convoy, while Lupo went alongside Altair and took off her surviving crew (124 men out of a total of 139). Lupo attempted to take Altair under tow, but at 02:47 on 20 October, Altair sank. Earlier on the 19th, the torpedo boat Aldebaran had left Piraeus to rescue Altair was mined and sank in the same minefield.

In December 1941, Barletta ran aground west of Euboea in the Gulf of Salonika.

==== 1942 ====
On 17 January 1942, the ship left Piraeus to escort a convoy that consisted of the Italian transports Città di Savona and Città di Alessandria and the German vessel Livorno to Suda. The rest of the escort group included the torpedo boats Lupo and Cassiopea and the German vessel Drache. The following day, the submarine HMS Porpoise attacked the convoy without success.

Barletta and the German minelayer Bulgaria laid a minefield off Zylakes, Greece, from 2 to 3 July 1942. They were escorted by Lupo and Cassiopea and the German destroyer Hermes.

She joined the torpedo boats Calatafimi and Monzambano to escort the German transport Wachtfels, which was torpedoed and sunk by the submarine HMS Proteus off Crete on 7 August.

Barletta was used as a transport on 16 September; carrying a load of gasoline in drums, she left Suda in company with the destroyer Nicoloso da Recco, bound for Tobruk in North Africa. The following day, the British submarine HMS Taku attempted unsuccessfully to torpedo Barletta, and she arrived in Tobruk undamaged later that morning.

The ship made another voyage to North Africa, this time from Palermo to Bizerta on 22–23 November. She was escorted by the torpedo boat Groppo, and she again came under attack by a British submarine, HMS Utmost, shortly before she reached Bizerta. She reached harbor without incident and later proceeded to Tunis.

Between 29 and 30 November, Barletta and the destroyer Antonio da Noli laid two sections of the minefields S 91 and S 92, with 172 and 154 mines respectively.

On 12 December 1942, the ship returned to Taranto. Based in the Apulian port, the unit was employed for a short time in the escort of traffic to and from Tunisia, before being subjected to work in the Taranto Arsenal.

==== 1943 ====
On 3 April 1943, once the work was completed, Barletta was again sent to the Aegean, carrying out both convoy escort missions and the laying of minefields off Apulia and the Ionian Islands.

Between 19 July and 4 September 1943, while an Anglo-American landing on the Italian coast was becoming more and more probable, Barletta, together with the auxiliary cruiser Francesco Morosini and the light cruisers Luigi Cadorna and Scipione Africano, participated in the laying of eleven minefields, for a total of 1591 mines, in the Gulf of Taranto.

The announcement of the Armistice of Cassibile on 3 September surprised the ship in its eponymous city, which remained under the control of Italian and Allied troops, thus avoiding its loss.

On 8 October 1943 the Barletta was part of the first Italian convoy on behalf of the Allies, which left from Augusta and headed for Algiers. Upon return from this mission, the auxiliary cruiser returned to Taranto on 17 October. Eight days later, on 25 October, Barletta was struck off the rolls of the auxiliary state fleet.

On the evening of 2 December 1943, the ship was at anchor near the old breakwater of Bari when, starting at around 19:15, the port was subjected to a heavy bombardment by about fifty Junkers Ju 88 bombers of the Luftwaffe, which sank or damaged irreparably between 17 and 28 ships (one of which, SS John Harvey, was loaded with mustard gas bombs, which exploded and released toxic gases in the port area). A first salvo of bombs fell forward of Barletta, causing a fire at the bow, near the ammunition magazine, then, at about 19:45, the ship was hit by several bombs especially on the side facing the sea. The crew, led by the chief engineer, tried to suppress the flames which were seriously threatening the magazine in the bow, but at 21:15 a nearby vessel exploded, inflicting further damage on Barletta. The magazine eventually caught fire and exploded, fatally damaging Barletta, which around nine o'clock in the morning of 3 December rolled over on her side and sank. A total of forty men were killed and another forty-four were wounded.

=== Postwar ===
The recovery of the wreck, which lay heeling 87° in twelve meters of water, began in May 1945 and ended in September 1948.

In the October 1948 the wreck of the refloated Barletta, was towed to Trieste to be rebuilt. On 25 September 1949 the ship was again in service as a cargo liner, with a gross tonnage of 1966 gt, a net tonnage of 1060 gt, a deadweight capacity of 1240 dwt and a capacity of 82 passengers (32 in first class, 24 in second class and 26 in third class), starting again the regular service for Adriatica: the first voyage, on the route Trieste-Venice-Bari-Piraeus-Istanbul-Smirne, started on 1 October 1949.

In 1951 the Adriatica S.A. di Navigazione became Adriatica S.p.A. di Navigazione. In 1956 the Barletta was assigned to another line, which touched Trieste, Venice, Dalmatia, Piraeus, Heraklion and Calamata.

On 9 (or 18) September 1962 the old motor vessel was laid up in the port of Trieste and in 1965 was dismantled by the company SIDEMAR.

== Bibliography ==
- Freivogel, Zvonimir & Rastelli, Achille (2015). Adriatic Naval War 1940–1945. Zagreb: Despot Infinitus. ISBN 978-953-7892-44-9.
- Naval War College Review. Newport: Naval War College. 1990. OCLC 1779130.
- Rohwer, Jürgen (2005). Chronology of the War at Sea 1939–1945 – The Naval History of World War Two. London: Chatham Publishing. ISBN 978-1-59114-119-8.
- Willmott, H. P. (2010). The Last Century of Sea Power: From Washington to Tokyo, 1922–1945. Bloomington: Indiana University Press. ISBN 978-0-253-35214-9.
