= Italian destroyer Turbine (1927) =

Destroyer of the Regia Marina

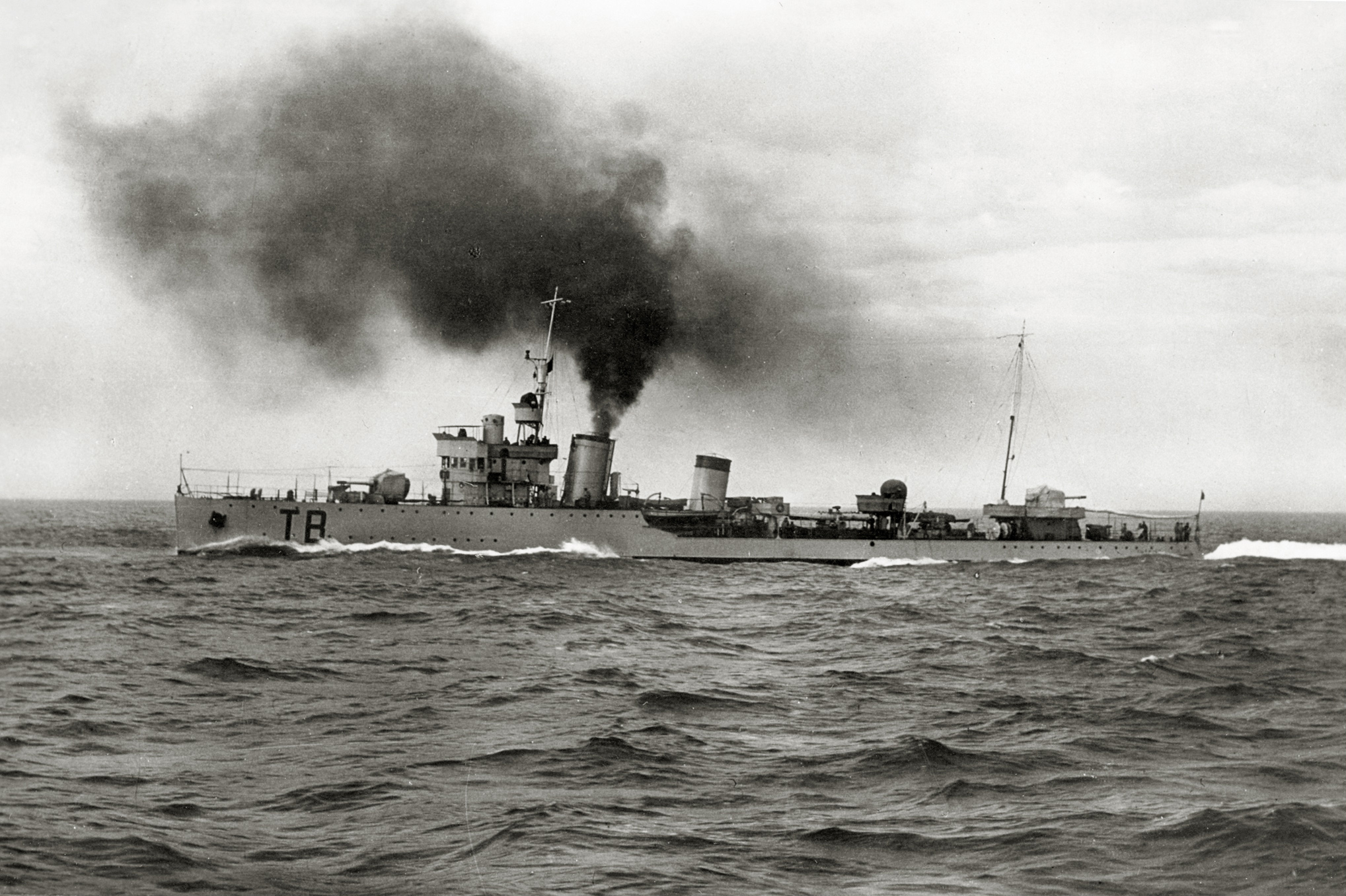
- Turbine at sea

History

Kingdom of Italy
- Name: Turbine
- Namesake: Whirlwind
- Builder: Odero, Sestri Ponente
- Laid down: 24 March 1925
- Launched: 21 April 1927
- Sponsored by: Ada Ravano
- Completed: 27 August 1927
- Identification: TR
- Fate: Captured, 9 September 1943

Nazi Germany
- Name: TA14
- Acquired: 9 September 1943
- Commissioned: 28 October 1943
- In service: 28 October 1943
- Fate: Sunk, 16 September 1944

General characteristics (as built)
- Class & type: Turbine-class destroyer
- Displacement: 1,090 t (1,070 long tons) (standard); 1,700 t (1,670 long tons) (full load)
- Length: 93.2 m (305 ft 9 in)
- Beam: 9.2 m (30 ft 2 in)
- Draught: 3 m (9 ft 10 in)
- Installed power: 3 Thornycroft boilers; 40,000 shp (30,000 kW)
- Propulsion: 2 shafts; 2 geared steam turbines
- Speed: 33 knots (61 km/h; 38 mph)
- Range: 3,200 nmi (5,900 km; 3,700 mi) at 14 knots (26 km/h; 16 mph)
- Complement: 179
- Armament: 2 × twin 120 mm (4.7 in) guns; 2 × single 40 mm (1.6 in) AA guns; 1 × twin 13.2 mm (0.52 in) machine guns; 2 × triple 533 mm (21 in) torpedo tubes; 52 mines

Turbine was the lead ship of her class of eight destroyers built for the Regia Marina (Royal Italian Navy) during the 1920s. Her name means whirlwind.

== Design and description ==
The Turbine-class destroyers were enlarged and improved versions of the preceding Sauro class. They had an overall length of 93.2 meters (306 ft), a beam of 9.2 meters (30 ft 2 in) and a mean draft of 3 meters (9 ft 10 in). They displaced 1,090 metric tons (1,070 long tons) at standard load, and 1,700 metric tons (1,670 long tons) at deep load. Their complement was 12 officers and 167 enlisted men.

The Turbines were powered by two Parsons geared steam turbines, each driving one propeller shaft using steam supplied by three Thornycroft boilers. The turbines were rated at 40,000 shaft horsepower (30,000 kW) for a speed of 33 knots (61 km/h; 38 mph) in service, although Turbine reached a speed of 39.6 knots (73.3 km/h; 45.6 mph) during her sea trials while lightly loaded. They carried enough fuel oil to give them a range of 3,200 nautical miles (5,900 km; 3,700 mi) at a speed of 14 knots (26 km/h; 16 mph).

Their main battery consisted of four 120-millimeter (4.7 in) guns in two twin-gun turrets, one each fore and aft of the superstructure. Anti-aircraft (AA) defense for the Turbine-class ships was provided by a pair of 40-millimeter (1.6 in) AA guns in single mounts amidships and a twin-gun mount for 13.2-millimeter (0.52 in) machine guns. They were equipped with six 533-millimeter (21 in) torpedo tubes in two triple mounts amidships. The Turbines could carry 52 mines.

== Construction and career ==
Turbine was laid down by Odero-Terni-Orlando at their Genoa-Sestri Ponente shipyard on 24 March 1925, launched on 21 April 1927 and completed on 27 August. Upon completion, Turbine, together with Nembo, Aquilone and Euro was assigned to the 2nd Squadron of the I Destroyer Flotilla based at La Spezia. Between 1929 and 1932 the destroyer carried out a number of training cruises in the Mediterranean. In 1931 Turbine together with Ostro, Aquilone and Borea as well as older Daniele Manin, Giovanni Nicotera and Pantera formed 1st Destroyer Flotilla, part of II Naval Division. In 1934 after another reorganization Turbine as well as Aquilone, Nembo and Euro were again reunited, now forming the 8th Destroyer Squadron, part of II Naval Division. Together with Nembo she was temporarily deployed to the Red Sea to conduct training in tropical climate in 1934.

=== Spanish Civil War ===
After the Civil War started in Spain in July 1936, both Italy and Nazi Germany supported the Nationalists of General Franco, whereas Soviet Union was actively supporting the Republicans. During the first year of the war, the Soviets used the Republican controlled ports of Bilbao and Santander in the North of Spain adjacent to the French border, but after their fall in the summer of 1937, the USSR was forced to use ports in the Mediterranean to continue supplying the Republicans. Both Italy and Germany deployed their submarines in the Mediterranean in early 1937 to interdict with Republican shipping, but without much success. On 3 August 1937 Franco made an urgent plea with Mussolini to use the Italian fleet to prevent the passage of a large Soviet transport convoy, which just departed from Odessa. Originally, only submarines were supposed to be used, but Mussolini was convinced by Franco to use Italian surface ships too against the Soviets. The Italian blockade was put into effect immediately, with two light cruisers, Armando Diaz and Luigi Cadorna, eight torpedo boats and eight destroyers, including Turbine, being deployed in and around the Strait of Sicily and Strait of Messina. At the time Turbine was under command of captain Virgilio Rusca.

On 17 August Turbine and Leone Pancaldo while on patrol off the African coast sighted Republican steamer Aldecoa sailing under the British flag. The freighter, however, managed to escape her pursuers by entering French territorial waters, and continuing close to the coast until she reached the port of Algiers.

On 30 August 1937 Turbine was on patrol together with Ostro, when they encountered the Soviet cargo ship Timiryazev around 16:00. The destroyers continued shadowing the ship until darkness fell, and around 21:00 Turbine launched two torpedoes at the Soviet vessel, and Ostro launched one. The cargo ship was hit by two torpedoes in quick succession and rapidly sank in the position 36°57′N 03°58′E, approximately 74 miles east of Algiers. Two lifeboats with all 29 survivors were towed to Dellys by local fishing boats, and successfully reached the shore at 01:00 on 31 August. The Soviet steamer was not a blockade runner, and was transporting 2,834 tons of coal from Cardiff to Port Said.

In September 1937 the Nyon Conference was called by France and Great Britain to address the "underwater piracy" conducted against merchant traffic in the Mediterranean. On 14 September an agreement was signed establishing British and French patrol zones around Spain (with a total of 60 destroyers and airforce employed) to counteract aggressive behavior by submarines. Italy was not directly accused, but had to comply with the agreement and suspend the maritime operations.

=== World War II ===
At the time of Italy entry into World War II Turbine together with Euro, Nembo and Aquilone formed 1st Destroyer Squadron based in Tobruk. Initially, she was assigned escort and anti-submarine duties.

On 6 June 1940, in preparation for hostilities, the ships of 1st Destroyer Squadron together with the auxiliar cruiser Bartletta laid fourteen minefields (540 mines) around Tobruk.

During her first war patrol she was on an anti-submarine mission in the Gulf of Taranto together with Strale. At 23:21 pm on 13 June 1940, Strale sighted an enemy submarine (HMS Odin) at the entrance of the Gulf of Taranto, and proceeded to attack her with gunfire and attempted to ram the submarine. Odin managed to get away with some damage, however, she was later that night sunk by Italian destroyer Baleno.

After an air reconnaissance revealed a large number of ships present in Tobruk harbor, including several destroyers, British command ordered an air attack on Tobruk on 12 June. The air strike was carried out by Blenheims from 45, 55, 113 and 211 Squadrons in the early morning hours of 12 June. British bombers were intercepted by CR.32s from 92nd, 93rd and 94th Squadriglias, forcing some bombers to turn away, or drop their bombs prematurely. Several bombers managed to get through and bombed the harbor between 04:52 and 05:02 causing only negligible damage.

In response the Italian command ordered a bombardment of Sollum. The raid was carried out both by Regia Aeronautica and Regia Marina, with twelve SM.79 bombers dropping bombs in the early morning of 15 June, while destroyers Turbine, Nembo and Aquilone shelled the town from 03:49 to 04:05, firing 220 shells of their main caliber, but dealing negligible damage to the installations due to thick fog present at the time of attack. Another bombardment of Sollum was performed between 05:35 and 06:18 on 26 June by the same destroyer group "with considerable effectiveness" expending 541 shells in the process.

On 19 June 1940 while conducting another anti-submarine mission Turbine, about 25 miles north of Tobruk, detected and attacked with depth charges another British submarine, Orpheus, and sank her in the approximate position 32°30′N 24°00′E.

On 5 July 1940 there were seven Turbine-class destroyers berthed in Tobruk harbor, including Turbine, together with four torpedo boats, six freighters and several auxiliary vessels. Between 10:00 to 11:15 a Short Sunderland reconnaissance plane overflew the harbor at an altitude of 1,500-2,000 meters and despite the anti-aircraft fire opened against it, confirmed the presence of numerous ships in the harbor. In the late afternoon a group of nine Fairey Swordfish torpedo bombers of 813 Naval Air Squadron took off from the airfield in Sidi Barrani and headed towards Tobruk. The air alarm was sounded at 20:06 but the Italians failed to detect the Allied aircraft until they were already over the harbor at 20:20. Destroyers had most of their personnel on board steamers Liguria and Sabbia with exception of dedicated air defense crews. The attack commenced a few minutes later, and lasted only seven minutes and resulted in five Italian ships being sunk or damaged. Not encountering any aerial opposition, British torpedo bombers attacked from low altitude (around 100 feet), and released their torpedoes from 400–500 meters away, almost point-blank. Zeffiro was attacked first by a plane piloted by Nicholas Kennedy, whose torpedo hit the destroyer in the bow, around the ammunition depot, between the bridge and a 120 mm cannon. The explosion broke the ship into two and sank it half an hour later. Freighter Manzoni was also hit, capsized and sank, while Euro and steamer Serenitas were hit, and had to be beached, and the ocean liner Liguria was hit and damaged. Two planes also attacked other destroyers, including Turbine, but failed to launch their torpedoes due to intense anti-aircraft fire. The air alarm was canceled at 21:31, and by that time all nine British planes were far away.

On 19 July 1940 British command, believing that the light cruiser Giovanni delle Bande Nere, damaged during the Battle of Cape Spada, had taken refuge in Tobruk, decided to launch a new bomber attack against the base. Turbine was berthed deeper in the harbor, in the port itself, close to the wreck of Euro which was beached after the 5 July raid. Most personnel was on board steamers Liguria and Sabbia with exception of dedicated air defense crews. Around 17:00 twelve Bristol Blenheim bombers from 55 Squadron and 211 Squadron RAF bombed the northern part of the harbor, slightly damaging an anti-aircraft battery and the port's facilities, and losing one aircraft. At 18:56 a seaplane from the 700 Naval Air Squadron launched by the British battleship Warspite appeared to investigate results of the bombing. The seaplane was immediately targeted by anti-aircraft batteries, and shot down. At 21:54 Tobruk was put on alert again after receiving reports from the Bardia and Sidi Belafarid advanced listening stations. Around 22:30 six Fairey Swordfish torpedo bombers from the 824 Naval Air Squadron RAF appeared in the skies above Tobruk harbor and were met with strong anti-aircraft fire. This forced the planes to make several passes over the area trying to avoid the fire, and also to acquire the targets, the situation exacerbated by a fairly cloudy night. The British finally managed to sort out their objectives by about 01:30 on 20 July and assumed attack formation at low altitude. At 01:32 steamer Sereno was struck in the stern by a torpedo, launched from a plane piloted by squadron commander F. S. Quarry, causing her to slowly sink. At 01:34 Ostro was hit in her stern ammunition depot by a torpedo launched from another plane, causing the ship to go ablaze and sink ten minutes later. Nembo was hit by a torpedo from a plane piloted by E. S. Ashley at 01:37 and sank. The British lost one plane in the attack which crash-landed on the way back in Italian controlled territory.

Following this attack the Italian Command considered Tobruk to be too vulnerable to enemy air attacks, and decided to shift deliveries to Benghazi. The cargo was then carried along the coast of Libya by coastal convoys of 1-2 ships, sometimes accompanied by escorts. Turbine along with other destroyers and torpedo boats were relocated to Benghazi as well. During the months of August and early September 1940 the destroyer conducted patrols outside the Benghazi harbor and some coastal escorting missions.

On 13 September 1940 the Italian Army invaded Egypt and captured Sollum. A convoy was sighted travelling east along the Libyan coast on 15 September by a Short Sunderland flying boat from 230 Squadron. In attempt to help their ground force, the Royal Navy designed attacks on Italian bases, in particular, Benghazi. During the day on 16 September, British forces consisting of the battleship Valiant, the heavy cruiser Kent, anti-aircraft cruisers Calcutta and Coventry, seven destroyers and the aircraft carrier Illustrious sortied from Alexandria.

In the evening of 16 September 1940 Turbine together with destroyers Borea and Aquilone was berthed in Benghazi harbor. At 19:30 steamers Maria Eugenia and Gloria Stella escorted by Fratelli Cairoli arrived from Tripoli bringing the total number of vessels present in the harbor to 32. During the night of 16–17 September, nine Swordfish bombers of 815 Squadron RAF carrying bombs and torpedoes, and six from 819 Squadron RAF armed with mines took off from Illustrious and approximately at 00:30 arrived undetected over Benghazi harbor. The anti-aircraft defenses opened fire but were unable to stop the attack. After passing over the harbor to determine their targets, Swordfish bombers made their first attack at 00:57 hitting and sinking Gloria Stella and severely damaging torpedo boat Cigno, harbor tug Salvatore Primo and an auxiliary vessel Giuliana. The bombers then conducted a second assault at 1:00 striking and sinking Maria Eugenia and destroyer Borea. While torpedo bombers attacked the harbor, six Swordfish aircraft armed with mines laid them undetected about 75 meters outside the harbor entrance. Neither Turbine nor Aquilone were targeted in this raid probably due to them being further away from the rest of the ships.

Next morning, the Libyan Naval Command (Comando Marilibia) fearing new attacks by the British aircraft decided to empty Benghazi harbor. At 11:38 on 17 September the first cargo ship Francesco Barbaro departed Benghazi for Tripoli escorted by an old torpedo boat Generale Antonino Cascino. As soon as the freighter left the harbor she hit a mine, and had to be towed back into port. The area was dredged to clear potential mines, and all ships were ordered to follow the cleared channel out of the harbor.

Turbine and Aquilone also received an order to leave Benghazi and departed from port at 20:15, with Turbine leading. At around 20:45 while about a mile outside the dredged area, Aquilone struck two magnetic mines, one in the middle and one by her stern, forcing the destroyer to immediately start veering to the left, towards the coast. The explosions threw many men overboard, and caused the depth charges to drop into water, but due to shallow depth, 40–45 feet, they did not go off. In the darkness, it was unclear what happened, and the harbor anti-aircraft weapons started firing, while Turbine accelerated and started zigzagging trying to protect herself from non-existent air threat. Turbine was then ordered to leave the area, not approach Aquilone, and proceed to Tripoli on her own. With her rudder stuck, Aquilone was flooded quickly, and sank in about 5 minutes. Despite quick sinking, rough weather and darkness, the ship was abandoned in order limiting the number of casualties, with 4 people killed, 9 missing and 20 wounded. The port of Benghazi was temporarily closed until the arrival from Italy of a minesweeper with electromagnetic sweeping gear to conduct proper demining.

On 8 February 1941 Turbine together with torpedo boats Orsa, Generale Antonio Cantore and Giuseppe Missori departed Naples escorting German vessels Ankara, Arcturus and Alicante carrying elements of the German 5th Light Division, part of the Afrika Korps, for Tripoli. The convoy had to stop at Palermo on 9 February to wait out a possible sortie by British Force H, and departed it next day arriving in Tripoli at 15:00 on 11 February 1941. Turbine then returned to Naples on 15 February.

On 19 February 1941 Turbine along with Saetta and Freccia departed from Naples to Tripoli escorting the third German Afrika Korps convoy consisting of ships Arta, Heraclea, Menes and Maritza and successfully reached Tripoli on 21 February.

On 8 March 1941 Turbine together with destroyers Fulmine and Baleno sailed from Naples for Tripoli escorting another German Afrika Korps convoy consisting of steamers Alicante, Arcturus, Wachtfels and Rialto carrying among other supplies the first tanks for the German 5th Light Division. The convoy successfully arrived in Tripoli on 12 March without incident.

On 2 April 1941 Turbine along with Saetta and torpedo boat Orsa departed from Naples for Tripoli escorting a supply convoy for the Afrika Korps consisting of German steamers Alicante, Maritza, Santa Fé and Italian vessels Procida and Tembien. The convoy arrived in Tripoli on 5 April without any incidents. On 7 April Alicante, Maritza, Santa Fé and Italian steamer Procida departed Tripoli on their return trip to Naples escorted by Turbine, Scirocco, Saetta and torpedo boats Orsa and Pegaso safely arriving in Italy on 11 April.

On 21 April 1941 Turbine together with Saetta, Strale and Folgore departed from Naples for Tripoli escorting another Afrika Korps convoy consisting of German ships Castellon, Arcturus, Leverkusen and Italian steamer Giulia. The convoy arrived at Tripoli on 24 April without any incidents.

On 1 May 1941 Turbine together with Saetta, Strale and Folgore departed Tripoli for return trip to Italy escorting German ships Castellon, Arcturus, Leverkusen, Wachtfels and Italian steamer Giulia. At 11:08 Upholder sighted the convoy in an approximate position 34°38′N 11°39′E, about 20 nmi (37 km; 23 mi) south-east of Kerkennah, and commenced an attack at 11:32. Arcturus was hit by two torpedoes and sank, while Leverkusen was struck by another torpedo and seriously damaged. Leverkusen had to turn around and head back to Tripoli, escorted by Turbine. Upholder was counter-attacked by the destroyers, forcing the submarine to dive and withdraw for about three hours but caused her no damage. Leverkusen was observed again by the submarine at 14:45 sailing slowly towards Tripoli with Turbine standing by. Upholder dove for another attack at 17:30 and launched another attack against Leverkusen at 19:01 with two torpedoes. Both torpedoes struck the freighter causing her to sink about 45 minutes later in approximate position 34°45′N 11°42′E, about 21 nmi (39 km; 24 mi) miles east of Kerkennah. The whole crew was saved by Turbine without loss. The rest of the convoy sailed into Trapani to wait out any further attacks.

On 16 May 1941 Turbine together with Folgore, Fulmine, Strale and Euro departed Naples escorting a German-Italian convoy consisting of freighters Preussen, Sparta, Capo Orso, Castelverde and Motia and tanker Panuco. The convoy proceeded to Palermo where tanker Superga joined in. At 11:30 on 19 May the convoy was attacked in the Sicilian Strait by British submarine Urge forcing ships to take evasive action. As a result, steamer Preussen and tanker Panuco collided, but were able to continue on to Tripoli. On 20 May Urge attempted another attack, targeting steamer Capo Orso and tanker Superga in the position 35°46′N 11°56′E but the attack proved to be unsuccessful. The convoy arrived at Tripoli on 21 May 1941.

On 24 May 1941 Turbine together with Folgore and Fulmine left Tripoli for Naples escorting German steamers Duisburg and Preussen and Italian ships Bosforo, Bainsizza and tankers Panuco and Superga. The convoy had to return to Tripoli and departed again on 26 May reaching Naples and Palermo safely on 31 May.

On 30 June 1941 Turbine together with Freccia, Strale and Dardo departed Naples for Tripoli escorting convoy consisting of Italian ships Francesco Barbaro, Sebastiano Veniero, Andrea Gritti, Rialto, Barbarigo and German steamer Ankara. The convoy successfully reached Tripoli on 2 July.

On 27 July 1941 Turbine together with Freccia, Strale and Dardo left Naples for Tripoli escorting Afrika Korps convoy consisting of Italian ships Bainsizza, Amsterdam, Col di Lana and German freighter Spezia. After safely arriving in Libya and unloading the same convoy departed Tripoli on 29 July 1941, safely arriving in Italy on 31 July.

On 4 August 1941 Turbine together with Freccia, Strale and Malococello left Tripoli for return trip to Italy escorting ships Bainsizza, Amsterdam, Col di Lana and Maddalena Odero. The convoy was unsuccessfully attacked on 5 August by British aircraft.

On 20 November 1941 Turbine, together with Perseo, left Naples for Tripoli escorting supply convoy C consisting of steamers Napoli and Vettor Pisani, with cruisers Gorizia, Trieste and Trento providing distant cover. At 00:23 on 21 November the covering cruiser force was detached from convoy C and returned to Naples. At 00:38 on 22 November Fairey Swordfish torpedo bombers from 830 Squadron attacked the covering force and torpedoed cruiser Luigi di Savoia Duca degli Abruzzi, blowing off her stern. The damaged cruiser was able to proceed under her own power to Messina accompanied by Giuseppe Garibaldi, Turbine, Perseo and several other destroyers. The British continued their attacks but failed to cause any more damage. At 01:00 the ships of convoy C were escorted by destroyer Geniere to Taranto to wait out any further air attacks. Turbine together with destroyers Corazziere and Carabiniere then continued on to Reggio.

On 13 December 1941 Turbine and Strale departed Argostoli escorting steamers Capo Orso and Iseo on their trip to Benghazi. Some time on 14 December Capo Orso and Iseo collided, putting themselves out of action. Turbine then returned to Argostoli and transported the survivors from Calitea to Patras on 14 December.

On 13 April 1942 Turbine and Freccia departed from Taranto for Tripoli escorting one of three supply convoys consisting of one merchant vessel, a part of Operation Aprilia.

On 5 May 1942 Turbine together with Ugolino Vivaldi and torpedo boats Pegaso and Enrico Cosenz departed Naples for Benghazi escorting three merchant ships. On 7 May British submarine Thorn tried to intercept the convoy, but the attack was unsuccessful.

On 22 June 1942 Turbine together with Folgore and torpedo boats Partenope, Castore and Orsa departed from Palermo for Benghazi escorting Italian merchant ships Nino Bixio and Mario Roselli. On 23 June the convoy was attacked by British aircraft that damaged the Mario Roselli. As a precaution, the convoy was put into Taranto, with Nino Bixio and Castore arriving there on 24 June. Mario Roselli was towed in by Orsa escorted by torpedo boats Antares and Aretusa on 25 June.

On 3 July 1942 Turbine together with Giovanni da Verrazzano, Euro and torpedo boats Antares, Pegaso, Castore, San Martino and Polluce departed from Taranto for Libya escorting cargo ships Ankara, Nino Bixio and Monviso. The convoy was attacked by British aircraft on several occasions and British submarines Thrasher and Turbulent but unsuccessfully.

Between 3 and 5 August 1942 Turbine together with destroyers Grecale, Freccia, Corsaro, Folgore and Legionario and torpedo boats Partenope and Calliope escorted three ship convoy consisting of Nino Bixio, Ankara and Sestrieri to Libya. The convoy carried 92 tanks, 340 automobiles, 3 locomotives, a crane, 292 soldiers, 4,381 tons of fuel and lubricants and 5,256 tons of other cargo. The ships reached their target destination without an incident despite heavy air attacks by Allied aircraft. On her return trip Turbine together with Grecale escorted the tanker Rondine and the cargo ship Citta di Savona from Tobruk to Greece. On 6 August British submarine Thorn attacked and missed Rondine. On 7 August Thorn attempted to attack steamer Istria but missed and was counterattacked and sunk by Pegaso. On 7 August Rondine was once again unsuccessfully targeted by another British submarine, the Proteus

Turbine was then brought back to Italy for maintenance and re-armament. Her anti-aircraft defenses were strengthened with the removal of the remaining 40 mm/39 pom-pom anti-aircraft guns and installation of extra 20mm/65 Breda anti-aircraft cannons bringing their total number to 7 (two in twin and 3 in single mounts). At the same time 2 depth charge throwers were installed.

Following the Axis' defeat at El Alamein, the success of Operation Torch, and the fall of Tripoli on 23 January 1943, Turbine was mostly involved in escort and anti-submarine operations in the Aegean for the remainder of the conflict. On 22 April 1943 Turbine opened fire on and captured two motor sailboats off Cape Vasilina, in the straits of Artemisium. The vessels carried two British officers who were operating as liaison agents with Greek partisans. On 24 April, the Italian destroyer bombarded a partisan camp at Gardiki. and on 28 April it sank a third motor sailboat loaded with ammunition in the same area. All these operations were made possible after the Italian intelligence broke the Greek partisan codes used to make contact with the British Middle East Command in Egypt.

=== In German service ===
At the time of Italy's signing of Armistice of Cassibile on 8 September 1943 Turbine was in Piraeus and was ordered by the Italian Command in Greece to surrender the vessel to the Germans. The order was obeyed and Turbine was transferred to Kriegsmarine on 9 September 1943, with most of the crew opting to leave the destroyer and being then sent to POW camps in Germany and Poland as "italian military internees". Turbine was renamed TA14 and became a part of 9. Torpedobootsflottille operating in the Aegean. The ship also received a significant anti-aircraft protection upgrade, as three torpedo tubes were removed and several 37mm and 20mm anti-aircraft cannons were added instead. TA14 was officially commissioned into the Kriegsmarine on 28 October 1943 and was used as an escort throughout her German service.

Ships sunk or captured by Turbine
Date	Ship	Flag	Tonnage	Ship Type	Aftermath
30 August 1937	Timiryazev	Soviet Union	2,109 GRT	Freighter	sunk
22 April 1943	Unknown	Greece United Kingdom	ca 300	Motor sailboat	seized
22 April 1943	Unknown	Greece United Kingdom	ca 300	Motor sailboat	seized
24 April 1943	Unknown	Greece United Kingdom	ca 300	Motor sailboat	sunk
Total:			ca 3,000 GRT		

== Bibliography ==
- Brescia, Maurizio (2012). Mussolini's Navy: A Reference Guide to the Regina Marina 1930–45. Annapolis, Maryland: Naval Institute Press. ISBN 978-1-59114-544-8.
- Fraccaroli, Aldo (1968). Italian Warships of World War II. Shepperton, UK: Ian Allan. ISBN 0-7110-0002-6.
- Greene, Jack & Massignani, Alessandro (1998). The Naval War in the Mediterranean, 1940–1943. London: Chatham Publishing. ISBN 1-86176-057-4.
- Gustavsson, Hakan (2010). Desert Prelude 1940-41: Early Clashes. Casemate Publishers. ISBN 978-8389450524.
- McMurtrie, Francis E., ed. (1937). Jane's Fighting Ships 1937. London: Sampson Low. OCLC 927896922.
- O'Hara, Vincent P. (2009). Struggle for the Middle Sea: The Great Navies at War in the Mediterranean Theater, 1940–1945. Annapolis, Maryland: Naval Institute Press. ISBN 978-1-59114-648-3.
- Roberts, John (1980). "Italy". In Chesneau, Roger (ed.). Conway's All the World's Fighting Ships 1922–1946. New York: Mayflower Books. pp. 280–317. ISBN 0-8317-0303-2.
- Rohwer, Jürgen (2005). Chronology of the War at Sea 1939–1945: The Naval History of World War Two (Third Revised ed.). Annapolis, Maryland: Naval Institute Press. ISBN 1-59114-119-2.
- Whitley, M. J. (1988). Destroyers of World War 2: An International Encyclopedia. Annapolis, Maryland: Naval Institute Press. ISBN 1-85409-521-8.
- Brown, David (2013). The Royal Navy and the Mediterranean: Vol.I: September 1939 – October 1940. Routledge. ISBN 978-1135281540.
- Bertke, Donald; Smith, Gordon; Kindell, Don (2012). World War II Sea War, Volume 3: The Royal Navy is Bloodied in the Mediterranean. Bertke Publications. ISBN 978-1937470012.
