= Italian destroyer Aquilone (1927) =

Destroyer of the Regia Marina

Coordinates: 32°06′28″N 20°01′30″E

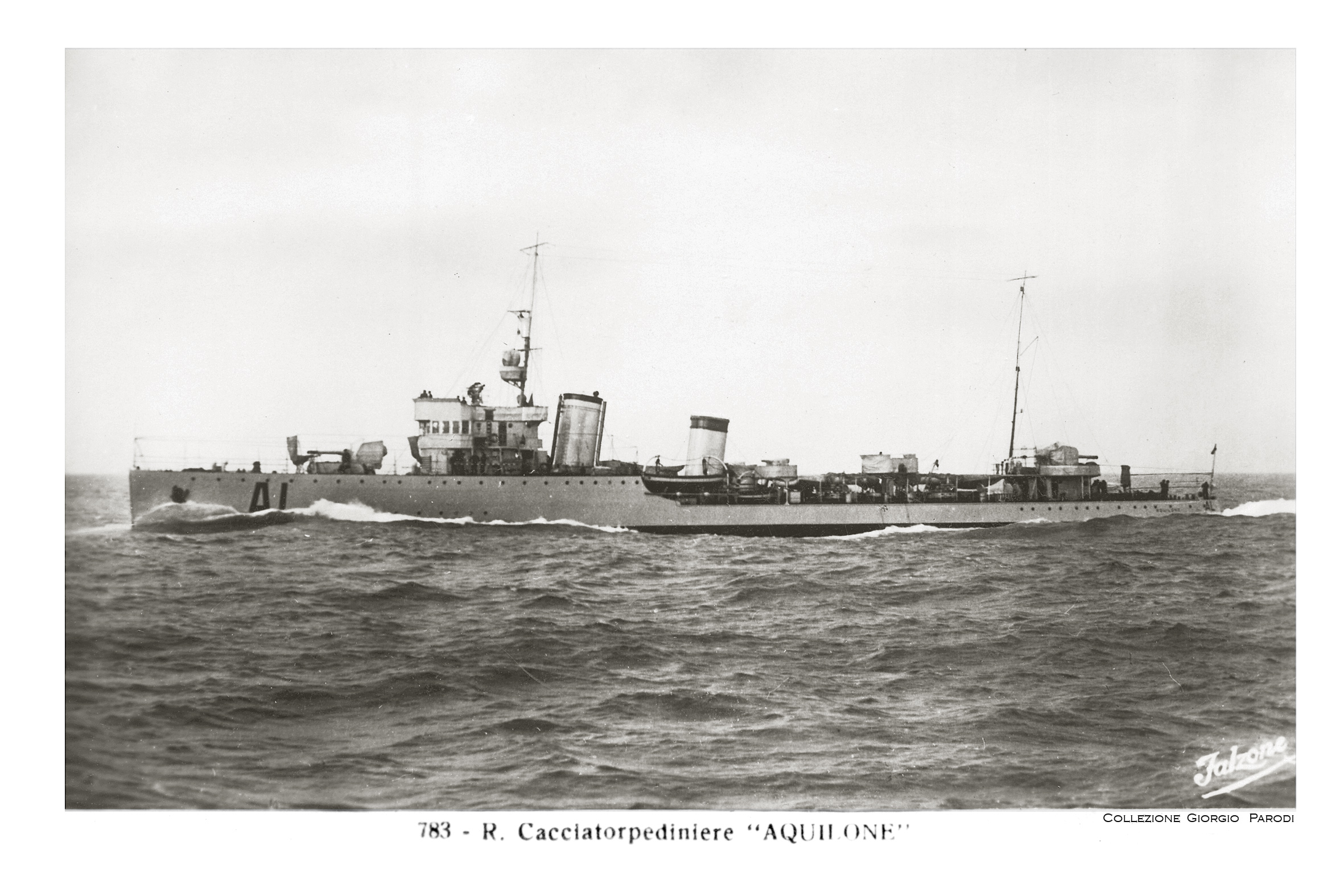
- Aquilone under way (mid 1930s)

History

Kingdom of Italy
- Name: Aquilone
- Namesake: Aquilone, a northerly wind
- Builder: Odero-Terni-Orlando, Genoa-Sestri Ponente
- Laid down: 18 May 1925
- Launched: 3 August 1927
- Completed: 3 December 1927
- Identification: AL
- Fate: Sunk, 17 September 1940

General characteristics (as built)
- Class & type: Turbine-class destroyer
- Displacement: 1,090 t (1,070 long tons) (standard); 1,700 t (1,670 long tons) (full load)
- Length: 93.2 m (305 ft 9 in)
- Beam: 9.2 m (30 ft 2 in)
- Draught: 3 m (9 ft 10 in)
- Installed power: 3 Thornycroft boilers; 40,000 shp (30,000 kW)
- Propulsion: 2 shafts; 2 geared steam turbines
- Speed: 33 knots (61 km/h; 38 mph)
- Range: 3,200 nmi (5,900 km; 3,700 mi) at 14 knots (26 km/h; 16 mph)
- Complement: 179
- Armament: 2 × twin 120 mm (4.7 in) guns; 2 × single 40 mm (1.6 in) AA guns; 1 × twin 13.2 mm (0.52 in) machine guns; 2 × triple 533 mm (21 in) torpedo tubes; 52 mines

Aquilone was one of eight Turbine-class destroyers built for the Regia Marina (Royal Italian Navy) during the late 1920s. She was named after Aquilone, a cold northerly wind.

== Design and description ==
The Turbine-class destroyers were enlarged and improved versions of the preceding Sauro class. They had an overall length of 93.2 meters (306 ft), a beam of 9.2 meters (30 ft 2 in) and a mean draft of 3 meters (9 ft 10 in). They displaced 1,090 metric tons (1,070 long tons) at standard load, and 1,700 metric tons (1,670 long tons) at deep load. Their complement was 12 officers and 167 enlisted men.

The Turbines were powered by two Parsons geared steam turbines, each driving one propeller shaft using steam supplied by three Thornycroft boilers. The turbines were rated at 40,000 shaft horsepower (30,000 kW) for a speed of 33 knots (61 km/h; 38 mph) in service, although Aquilone reached a speed of 39.5 knots (73.2 km/h; 45.5 mph) during her sea trials while lightly loaded. They carried enough fuel oil to give them a range of 3,200 nautical miles (5,900 km; 3,700 mi) at a speed of 14 knots (26 km/h; 16 mph).

Their main battery consisted of four 120-millimeter (4.7 in) guns in two twin-gun turrets, one each fore and aft of the superstructure. Anti-aircraft (AA) defense for the Turbine-class ships was provided by a pair of 40-millimeter (1.6 in) AA guns in single mounts amidships and a twin-gun mount for 13.2-millimeter (0.52 in) machine guns. They were equipped with six 533-millimeter (21 in) torpedo tubes in two triple mounts amidships. The Turbines could carry 52 mines.

== Construction and career ==
Aquilone was laid down by Odero-Terni-Orlando at their Genoa-Sestri Ponente shipyard on 18 May 1925, launched on 3 August 1927 and completed on 3 December. Upon her completion, Aquilone, together with Turbine, Nembo and Euro was assigned to the 2nd Squadron of the I Destroyer Flotilla based at La Spezia. Between 1929 and 1932 she carried out several training cruises in the Mediterranean. In 1932 during the training exercises she launched and accidentally hit Zeffiro with a torpedo, but fortunately no damage was done as torpedo proved to be defective. In 1931 Aquilone together with Turbine, Ostro and Borea as well as older Daniele Manin, Giovanni Nicotera and Pantera formed 1st Destroyer Flotilla, part of II Naval Division. In 1934 after another reorganization Aquilone as well as Nembo, Euro and Turbine were again reunited, now forming the 8th Destroyer Squadron, part of II Naval Division.

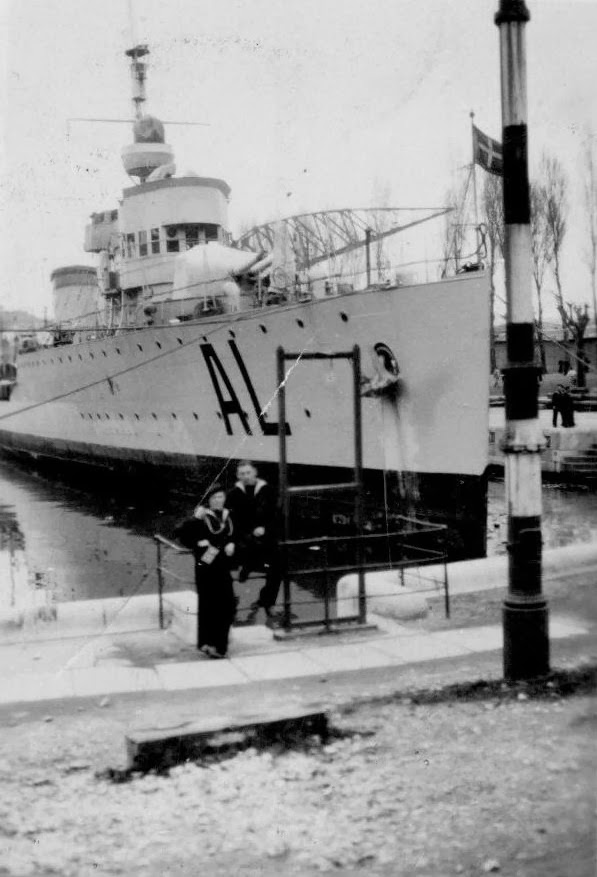
Aquilone in port, 1931

Early in 1938 the ship was moved to Brindisi and from there she departed for Tobruk in Libya which became her new base in March 1938. Aquilone conducted many exploratory and training cruises in the eastern Mediterranean throughout 1938 and part of 1939, visiting Albania, Greece and the island of Crete. She also escorted Italian submarines to Port Said on their voyage to the Italian East Africa. During these cruises the destroyer went through significant storms on several occasions resulting in damage. In November 1939 Aquilone returned to Brindisi to unload all the ammunition and proceeded immediately to Fiume for repairs. In March 1940 the repairs were finished and Aquilone sailed to Brindisi to load ammunition, and from there continued on to Tobruk arriving there in April 1940. With the war drawing closer, the destroyer was ordered to conduct daily exercises, and on May 20 received an order to lay protective minefields around ports of Tripoli, Benghazi, Tobruk and a few others. The minelaying operations continued through the months of June and July as well.

At the time of Italy entry into World War II on June 10, 1940, Aquillone together with Turbine, Euro and Nembo formed 1st Destroyer Squadron based in Tobruk. The destroyer was under command of Captain Alberto Agostini.

After an air reconnaissance revealed large number of ships present in Tobruk harbor, including several destroyers, British command ordered an air attack on Tobruk on June 12. The air strike was carried out by Blenheims from 45, 55, 113 and 211 Squadrons in the early morning hours of June 12. British bombers were intercepted by CR.32s from 92nd, 93rd and 94th Squadriglias, forcing some bombers to turn away, or drop their bombs prematurely. Several bombers managed to get through and bombed the harbor between 04:52 and 05:02 causing only negligible damage. Aquilone was not hit directly, but one of the bombs exploded nearby wounding her radio-operator.

In response the Italian command ordered a bombardment of Sollum. The raid was carried out both by Regia Aeronautica and Regia Marina, with twelve SM.79 bombers dropping bombs in the early morning of June 14, while destroyers Aquilone, Nembo and Turbine shelled the town from 03:49 to 04:05, firing 220 shells of their main caliber, but dealing negligible damage to the installations due to thick fog present at the time of attack. Another bombardment of Sollum was performed between 05:35 and 06:18 on June 26 by the same destroyer group "with considerable effectiveness" expending 541 shells in the process.

On June 29 Aquilone was sent to look for survivors of Espero sunk the previous day in the battle against British cruisers. Despite her best efforts, she could not locate anyone, but during the search she was spotted and attacked by a British flying boat. The bombs dropped by the aircraft exploded 50–60 meters away from the destroyer's stern, forcing the ship to withdraw at maximum speed, zigzagging and shooting from her anti-aircraft guns. Aquilone arrived at Tobruk in the evening of the same day.

On July 5, 1940, there were seven Turbine-class destroyers berthed in Tobruk harbor, including Aquilone, together with four torpedo boats, six freighters and several auxiliary vessels. Between 10:00 to 11:15 a Short Sunderland reconnaissance plane overflew the harbor at an altitude of 1,500-2,000 meters and despite the anti-aircraft fire opened against it, confirmed the presence of numerous ships in the harbor. In the late afternoon a group of nine Fairey Swordfish torpedo bombers of 813 Naval Air Squadron took off from the airfield in Sidi Barrani and headed towards Tobruk. The air alarm was sounded at 20:06 but the Italians failed to detect the Allied aircraft until they were already over the harbor at 20:20. Destroyers had most of their personnel on board steamers Liguria and Sabbia with exception of dedicated air defense crews. The attack commenced a few minutes later, and lasted only seven minutes and resulted in five Italian ships being sunk or damaged. Not encountering any aerial opposition, British torpedo bombers attacked from low altitude (around 100 feet), and released their torpedoes from 400 to 500 meters away, almost point-blank. Zeffiro was attacked first by a plane piloted by Nicholas Kennedy, whose torpedo hit the destroyer in the bow, around the ammunition depot, between the bridge and a 120 mm cannon. The explosion broke the ship into two and sank it half an hour later. Freighter Manzoni was also hit, capsized and sank, while Euro and steamer Serenitas were hit, and had to be beached, and the ocean liner Liguria was hit and damaged. Two planes also attacked other destroyers, including Aquilone, but failed to launch their torpedoes due to intense anti-aircraft fire.

On 19 July 1940 British command, believing that the light cruiser Giovanni delle Bande Nere, damaged during the Battle of Cape Spada, had taken refuge in Tobruk, decided to launch a new bomber attack against the base. Aquilone along with Nembo and Ostro were berthed at the same location as during the July 5 raid. Most personnel was on board steamers Liguria and Sabbia with exception of dedicated air defense crews. Around 17:00 twelve Bristol Blenheim bombers from 55 Squadron and 211 Squadron RAF bombed the northern part of the harbor, slightly damaging an anti-aircraft battery and the port's facilities, and losing one aircraft. At 18:56 a seaplane from the 700 Naval Air Squadron launched by the British battleship Warspite appeared to investigate results of the bombing. The seaplane was immediately targeted by anti-aircraft batteries, and shot down. At 21:54 Tobruk was put on alert again after receiving reports from the Bardia and Sidi Belafarid advanced listening stations. Around 22:30 six Fairey Swordfish torpedo bombers from the 824 Naval Air Squadron RAF appeared in the skies above Tobruk harbor and were met with strong anti-aircraft fire. This forced the planes to make several passes over the area trying to avoid the fire, and also to acquire the targets, the situation exacerbated by a fairly cloudy night. The British finally managed to sort out their objectives by about 01:30 on July 20 and assumed attack formation at low altitude. At 01:32 steamer Sereno was struck in the stern by a torpedo, launched from a plane, piloted by squadron commander F.S. Quarry, causing her to slowly sink. At 01:34 Ostro was hit in her stern ammunition depot by a torpedo launched from another plane, causing the ship to go ablaze and sink ten minutes later. Aquilone who was moored about sixty meters away from Ostro, was showered by burning debris but suffered no damage. Nembo was hit by a torpedo at 01:37 and sank. The British lost one plane in the attack which crash-landed on the way back in the Italian controlled territory.

Following this attack the Italian Command considered Tobruk to be too vulnerable to enemy air attacks, and decided to shift deliveries to Benghazi. The cargo was then carried along the coast of Libya by coastal convoys of 1–2 ships, sometimes accompanied by escorts. Aquilone along with other destroyers and torpedo boats were relocated to Benghazi as well. During the months of August and early September 1940 the destroyer conducted patrols outside the Benghazi harbor and some coastal escorting missions.

On September 13, 1940, the Italian Army invaded Egypt and captured Sollum. A convoy was sighted travelling east along the Libyan coast on September 15 by a Short Sunderland flying boat from 230 Squadron. In attempt to help their ground force, the Royal Navy designed attacks on Italian bases, in particular, Benghazi. During the day on September 16, British force consisting of the battleship Valiant, the heavy cruiser Kent, the anti-aircraft cruisers Calcutta and Coventry, seven destroyers and the aircraft carrier Illustrious sortied from Alexandria.

In the evening of September 16, 1940 Aquilone together with destroyers Borea and Turbine was berthed in Benghazi harbor. At 19:30 steamers Maria Eugenia and Gloria Stella escorted by Fratelli Cairoli arrived from Tripoli bringing the total number of vessels present in the harbor to 32. During the night of September 16 and 17, nine Swordfish bombers of 815 Squadron RAF carrying bombs and torpedoes, and six from 819 Squadron RAF armed with mines took off from Illustrious and approximately at 00:30 arrived undetected over Benghazi harbor. The anti-aircraft defenses opened fire but were unable to stop the attack. After passing over the harbor to determine their targets, Swordfish bombers made their first attack at 00:57 hitting and sinking Gloria Stella and severely damaging torpedo boat Cigno, harbor tug Salvatore Primo and an auxiliary vessel Giuliana. The bombers then conducted a second assault at 1:00 striking and sinking Maria Eugenia and destroyer Borea. Aquilone opened fire from her anti-aircraft guns, and was nearly missed by a bomb that fell 5–6 meters away. She was not damaged in the attack, and gathered survivors from Borea. While torpedo bombers attacked the harbor, six Swordfish aircraft armed with mines laid them undetected about 75 meters outside the harbor entrance.

=== Sinking ===
Next morning, the Libyan Naval Command (Comando Marilibia) fearing new attacks by the British aircraft decided to empty Benghazi harbor. At 11:38 on September 17 the first cargo ship Francesco Barbaro departed Benghazi for Tripoli escorted by an old torpedo boat Generale Antonino Cascino. As soon as the freighter left the harbor she hit a mine, and had to be towed back into port. The area was dredged to clear potential mines, and all ships were ordered to follow the cleared channel out of the harbor.

Aquilone and Turbine also received an order to leave Benghazi and departed from port at 20:15, with Turbine leading. At around 20:45 while about a mile outside the dredged area, Aquilone struck two magnetic mines, one in the middle and one by her stern, forcing the destroyer to immediately start veering to the left, towards the coast. The explosions threw many men overboard, and caused the depth charges to drop into water, but due to shallow depth, 40–45 feet, they did not go off. In the darkness, it was unclear what happened, and the harbor anti-aircraft weapons started firing, while Turbine accelerated and started zigzagging trying to protect herself from non-existent air threat. Turbine was then ordered to leave the area, not approach Aquilone, and proceed to Tripoli on her own. With her rudder stuck, Aquilone was flooded quickly, and sank in about 5 minutes. Despite quick sinking, rough weather and darkness, the ship was abandoned in order limiting the number of casualties, with 4 people killed, 9 missing and 20 wounded. The port of Benghazi was temporarily closed until the arrival from Italy of a minesweeper with electromagnetic sweeping gear to conduct proper demining.

== Bibliography ==
- Brescia, Maurizio (2012). Mussolini's Navy: A Reference Guide to the Regina Marina 1930–45. Annapolis, Maryland: Naval Institute Press. ISBN 978-1-59114-544-8.
- Fraccaroli, Aldo (1968). Italian Warships of World War II. Shepperton, UK: Ian Allan. ISBN 0-7110-0002-6.
- Greene, Jack & Massignani, Alessandro (1998). The Naval War in the Mediterranean, 1940–1943. London: Chatham Publishing. ISBN 1-86176-057-4.
- Gustavsson, Hakan (2010). Desert Prelude 1940-41: Early Clashes. Casemate Publishers. ISBN 978-8389450524.
- McMurtrie, Francis E., ed. (1937). Jane's Fighting Ships 1937. London: Sampson Low. OCLC 927896922.
- O'Hara, Vincent P. (2009). Struggle for the Middle Sea: The Great Navies at War in the Mediterranean Theater, 1940–1945. Annapolis, Maryland: Naval Institute Press. ISBN 978-1-59114-648-3.
- Roberts, John (1980). "Italy". In Chesneau, Roger (ed.). Conway's All the World's Fighting Ships 1922–1946. New York: Mayflower Books. pp. 280–317. ISBN 0-8317-0303-2.
- Rohwer, Jürgen (2005). Chronology of the War at Sea 1939–1945: The Naval History of World War Two (Third Revised ed.). Annapolis, Maryland: Naval Institute Press. ISBN 1-59114-119-2.
- Whitley, M. J. (1988). Destroyers of World War 2: An International Encyclopedia. Annapolis, Maryland: Naval Institute Press. ISBN 1-85409-521-8.
- Brown, David (2013). The Royal Navy and the Mediterranean: Vol.I: September 1939 - October 1940. Routledge. ISBN 978-1135281540.
