= Italian destroyer Borea (1927) =

Destroyer of the Regia Marina

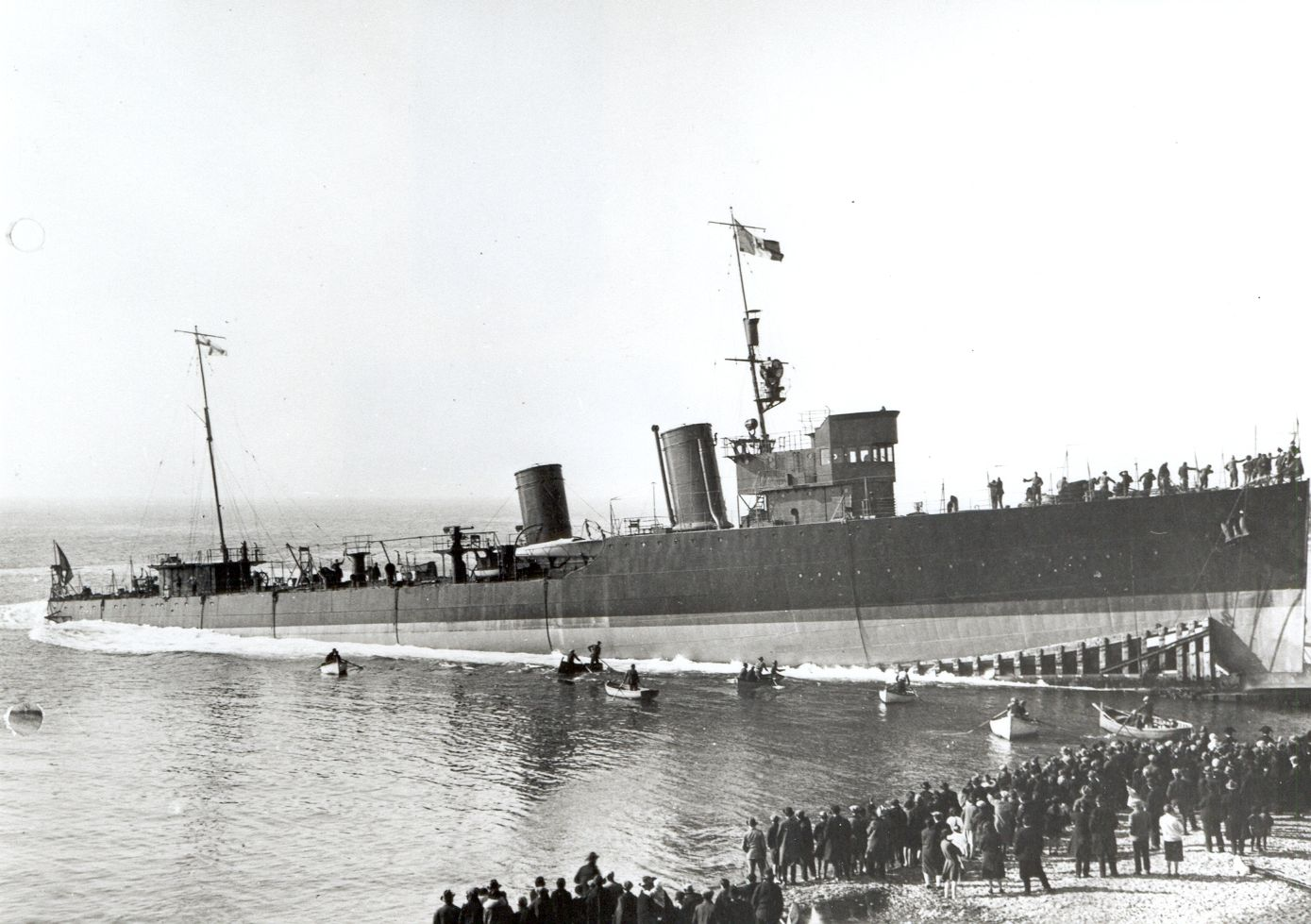
- Borea being launched

History

Kingdom of Italy
- Name: Borea
- Namesake: Northerly wind
- Builder: Ansaldo, Genoa
- Laid down: 29 April 1925
- Launched: 28 January 1927
- Completed: 14 November 1927
- Identification: BR
- Motto: Romanamente
- Fate: Sunk, 17 September 1940

General characteristics (as built)
- Class & type: Turbine-class destroyer
- Displacement: 1,090 t (1,070 long tons) (standard); 1,700 t (1,670 long tons) (full load)
- Length: 93.2 m (305 ft 9 in)
- Beam: 9.2 m (30 ft 2 in)
- Draught: 3 m (9 ft 10 in)
- Installed power: 3 Thornycroft boilers; 40,000 shp (30,000 kW)
- Propulsion: 2 shafts; 2 geared steam turbines
- Speed: 33 knots (61 km/h; 38 mph)
- Range: 3,200 nmi (5,900 km; 3,700 mi) at 14 knots (26 km/h; 16 mph)
- Complement: 179
- Armament: 2 × twin 120 mm (4.7 in) guns; 2 × single 40 mm (1.6 in) AA guns; 1 × twin 13.2 mm (0.52 in) machine guns; 2 × triple 533 mm (21 in) torpedo tubes; 52 mines

Borea was one of eight Turbine-class destroyers built for the Regia Marina (Royal Italian Navy) during the late 1920s. She was named after a northerly wind, Borea, bringing frigid, dry air to the Italian peninsula. The ship played a minor role in the Spanish Civil War of 1936–1937, supporting the Nationalists.

== Design and description ==
The Turbine-class destroyers were enlarged and improved versions of the preceding Sauro class. They had an overall length of 93.2 meters (306 ft), a beam of 9.2 meters (30 ft 2 in) and a mean draft of 3 meters (9 ft 10 in). They displaced 1,090 metric tons (1,070 long tons) at standard load, and 1,700 metric tons (1,670 long tons) at deep load. Their complement was 12 officers and 167 enlisted men.

The Turbines were powered by two Parsons geared steam turbines, each driving one propeller shaft using steam supplied by three Thornycroft boilers. The turbines were rated at 40,000 shaft horsepower (30,000 kW) for a speed of 33 knots (61 km/h; 38 mph) in service, although Borea reached a speed of 36.5 knots (67.6 km/h; 42.0 mph) during her sea trials while lightly loaded. They carried enough fuel oil to give them a range of 3,200 nautical miles (5,900 km; 3,700 mi) at a speed of 14 knots (26 km/h; 16 mph).

Their main battery consisted of four 120-millimeter (4.7 in) guns in two twin-gun turrets, one each fore and aft of the superstructure. Anti-aircraft (AA) defense for the Turbine-class ships was provided by a pair of 40-millimeter (1.6 in) AA guns in single mounts amidships and a twin-gun mount for 13.2-millimeter (0.52 in) machine guns. They were equipped with six 533-millimeter (21 in) torpedo tubes in two triple mounts amidships. The Turbines could carry 52 mines.

== Construction and career ==
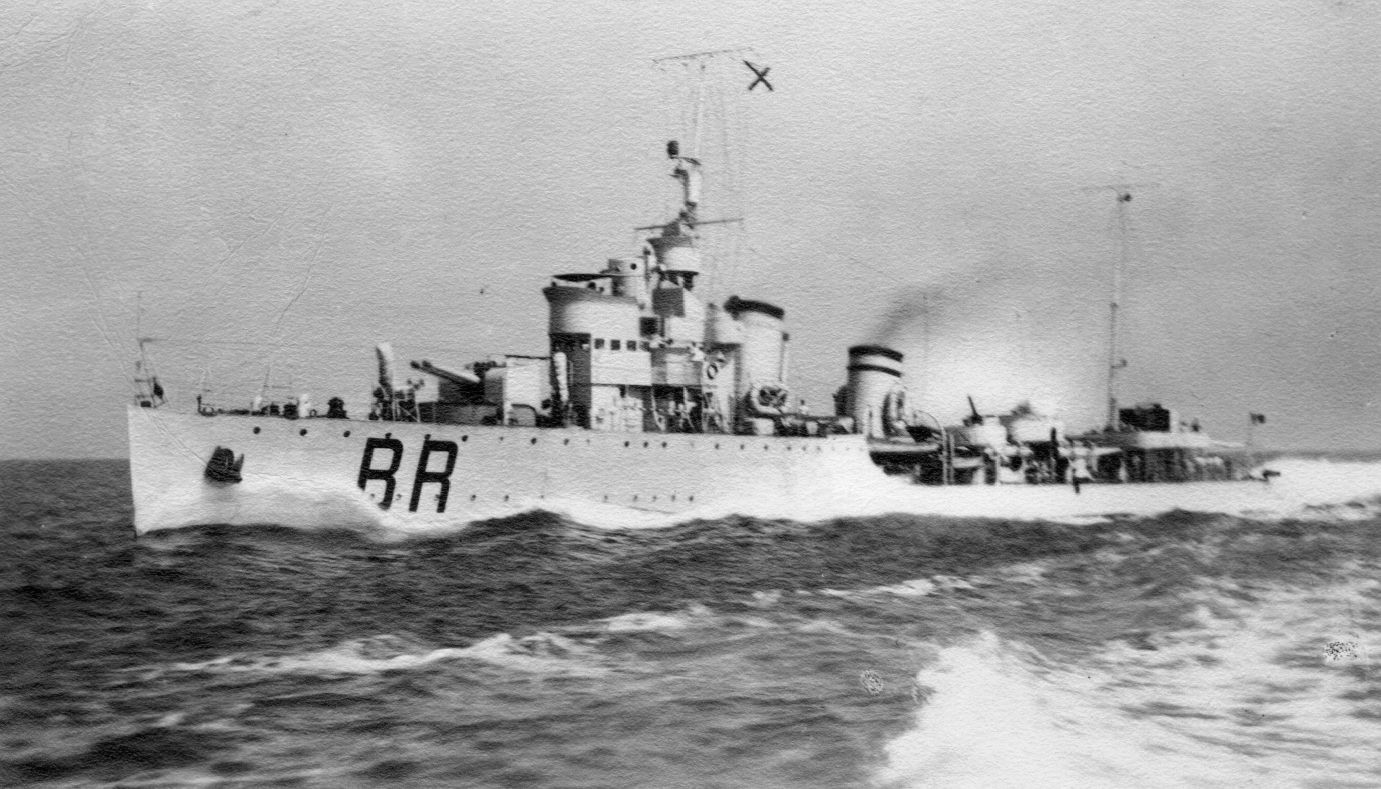
Borea at high speed

Borea was laid down by Gio. Ansaldo & C. at their Genoa shipyard on 29 April 1925, launched on 28 January 1927 and completed on 14 November. The ship was initially assigned to the 5th Destroyer Squadron for a short time. In March 1928 she participated in a training cruise in the Tyrrhenian Sea. Borea was then assigned together with Espero, Ostro and Zeffiro to the 1st Squadron of the I Destroyer Flotilla based at La Spezia. In 1928 the destroyer also visited Ibiza, followed up by another cruise to Tripoli in 1929. In the summer of 1930 Borea together with the ships of her squadron participated in the training cruise in the Aegean Sea visiting Nafplion, Thessaloniki, Rhodes and other Dodecanese islands. In 1931 Borea together with Turbine, Ostro and Aquilone as well as older Daniele Manin, Giovanni Nicotera and Pantera formed 1st Destroyer Flotilla, part of II Naval Division. In 1934 after another reorganization Borea as well as Espero, Zeffiro and Ostro were again reunited, now forming the 4th Destroyer Squadron, part of II Naval Division.

During the Spanish Civil War Borea conducted 4 reconnaissance missions in autumn 1936 on behalf of the Nationalists. In August–September 1937 she participated in the Italian blockade of Republican Spain and performed three missions enforcing the blockade. In summer 1938 she conducted several patrol and escort missions from her temporary base at the Balearic Islands.

At the end of 1938 she was relocated to Tobruk, then briefly recalled in the spring of 1939 to participate in the invasion of Albania before returning to Tobruk in the autumn of the same year.

At the time of Italy entrance into World War II on 10 June 1940, Borea together with Espero, Ostro and Zeffiro was part of 2nd Destroyer Squadron based in Taranto. Borea was assigned escort duties, accompanying convoys from Sicily to Libya.

On 30 June 1940 a large Italian convoy sailed from Augusta carrying troops, supplies, ammunition and fuel. The convoy consisted of six cargo and passenger ships and was escorted by 6 destroyers, including Borea, and 4 torpedo boats. On 5 July 1940 there were seven Turbine-class destroyers berthed in Tobruk harbor together with four torpedo boats, six freighters and several auxiliary vessels. Between 10:00 to 11:15 a Short Sunderland reconnaissance plane overflew the harbor at an altitude of 1,500-2,000 meters and despite the anti-aircraft fire opened against it, confirmed the presence of numerous ships in the harbor. In the late afternoon a group of nine Fairey Swordfish torpedo bombers of 813 Naval Air Squadron took off from the airfield in Sidi Barrani and headed towards Tobruk. The air alarm was sounded at 20:06 but the Italians failed to detect the Allied aircraft until they were already over the harbor at 20:20. Destroyers had most of their personnel on board the steamers Liguria and Sabbia with exception of dedicated air-defense crews. The attack commenced a few minutes later, and lasted only seven minutes and resulted in five Italian ships being sunk or damaged. Not encountering any aerial opposition, British torpedo bombers attacked from low altitude (around 100 feet), and released their torpedoes from 400–500 meters away, almost point-blank. Zeffiro was attacked first by a plane piloted by Nicholas Kennedy, whose torpedo hit the ship in the bow, around the ammunition magazine, between the bridge and a 120 mm cannon. The explosion broke the ship into two and sank it half an hour later. Freighter Manzoni was also hit, capsized and sank, while Euro and steamer Serenitas were hit, and had to be beached, and the ocean liner Liguria was hit and damaged. Two planes also attacked other destroyers, but failed to launch their torpedoes due to intense anti-aircraft fire.

On 13 September 1940 the Italian Army invaded Egypt and captured Sollum. A convoy was sighted travelling east along the Libyan coast on 15 September by a Short Sunderland flying boat from 230 Squadron. In attempt to help their ground force, the Royal Navy designed attacks on Italian bases, in particular, Benghazi. During the day on 16 September British forces, consisting of the battleship Valiant, the heavy cruiser Kent, anti-aircraft cruisers Calcutta and Coventry, seven destroyers and the aircraft carrier Illustrious, sortied from Alexandria.

In the evening of 16 September 1940 Borea, together with destroyers Aquilone and Turbine, was berthed in Benghazi harbor. At 19:30 steamers Maria Eugenia and Gloria Stella escorted by Fratelli Cairoli arrived from Tripoli bringing the total number of vessels present in the harbor to 32. During the night of 16–17 September nine Swordfish bombers of 815 Squadron RAF carrying bombs and torpedoes, and six from 819 Squadron RAF armed with mines took off from Illustrious and approximately at 00:30 arrived undetected over Benghazi harbor. The anti-aircraft defenses opened fire but were unable to stop the attack. After passing over the harbor to determine their targets, the Swordfish bombers made their first attack at 00:57 hitting and sinking Gloria Stella and severely damaging torpedo boat Cigno, harbor tug Salvatore Primo and an auxiliary vessel Giuliana. The bombers then conducted a second assault at 1:00 striking and sinking Maria Eugenia. Borea was also targeted during the second sweep, with the first bomb exploding between the destroyer and the steamer Città di Livorno but causing no damage to either ship. A short while later, a second bomb hit Borea on her port side, around 40/39 mm cannon platform. The bomb penetrated all the way down into the hold and exploded breaking the ship in two causing rapid flooding and sinking in shallow waters of the harbor. Due to rapid sinking most of the crew was able to easily abandon ship either by jumping or simply walking off the bridge and swimming towards the destroyer Aquilone. There was a single casualty, a sailor who at the moment of the attack was sleeping in the engine room, near the area of bomb explosion.

== Bibliography ==
- Brescia, Maurizio (2012). Mussolini's Navy: A Reference Guide to the Regina Marina 1930–45. Annapolis, Maryland: Naval Institute Press. ISBN 978-1-59114-544-8.
- Brown, David (2013). The Royal Navy and the Mediterranean: Vol. I: September 1939 - October 1940. Routledge. ISBN 978-1135281540.
- Fraccaroli, Aldo (1968). Italian Warships of World War II. Shepperton, UK: Ian Allan. ISBN 0-7110-0002-6.
- Greene, Jack & Massignani, Alessandro (1998). The Naval War in the Mediterranean, 1940–1943. London: Chatham Publishing. ISBN 1-86176-057-4.
- Gustavsson, Hakan (2010). Desert Prelude 1940-41: Early Clashes. Casemate Publishers. ISBN 978-8389450524.
- McMurtrie, Francis E., ed. (1937). Jane's Fighting Ships 1937. London: Sampson Low. OCLC 927896922.
- O'Hara, Vincent P. (2009). Struggle for the Middle Sea: The Great Navies at War in the Mediterranean Theater, 1940–1945. Annapolis, Maryland: Naval Institute Press. ISBN 978-1-59114-648-3.
- Roberts, John (1980). "Italy". In Chesneau, Roger (ed.). Conway's All the World's Fighting Ships 1922–1946. New York: Mayflower Books. pp. 280–317. ISBN 0-8317-0303-2.
- Rohwer, Jürgen (2005). Chronology of the War at Sea 1939–1945: The Naval History of World War Two (Third Revised ed.). Annapolis, Maryland: Naval Institute Press. ISBN 1-59114-119-2.
- Whitley, M. J. (1988). Destroyers of World War 2: An International Encyclopedia. Annapolis, Maryland: Naval Institute Press. ISBN 1-85409-521-8.
