= Italian destroyer Nembo (1927) =

Destroyer of the Regia Marina

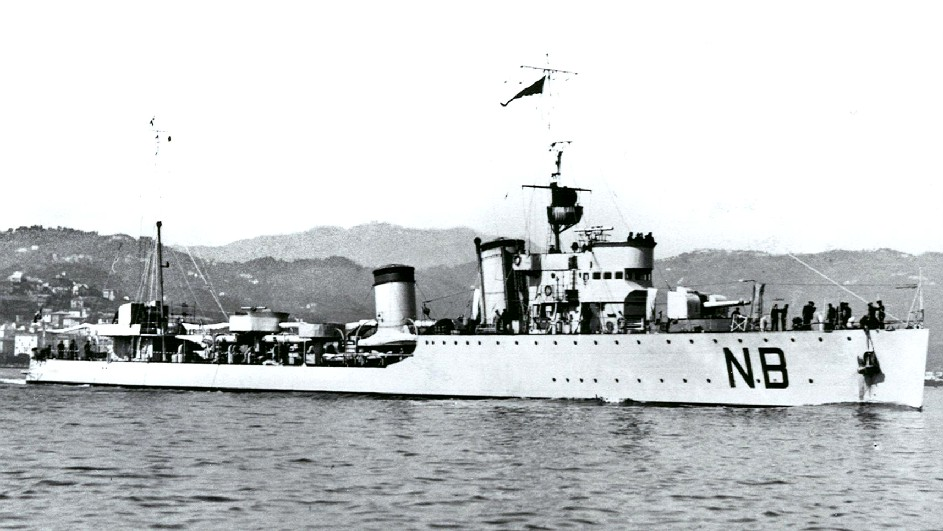

History

Kingdom of Italy
- Name: Nembo
- Builder: Cantieri del Tirreno, Riva Trigoso
- Laid down: 21 January 1925
- Launched: 27 January 1927
- Commissioned: 24 October 1927
- Fate: Sunk, 20 July 1940

General characteristics (as built)
- Class & type: Turbine-class destroyer
- Displacement: 1,090 t (1,070 long tons) (standard); 1,700 t (1,670 long tons) (full load)
- Length: 93.2 m (305 ft 9 in)
- Beam: 9.2 m (30 ft 2 in)
- Draught: 3 m (9 ft 10 in)
- Installed power: 3 Thornycroft boilers; 40,000 shp (30,000 kW)
- Propulsion: 2 shafts; 2 geared steam turbines
- Speed: 33 knots (61 km/h; 38 mph)
- Range: 3,200 nmi (5,900 km; 3,700 mi) at 14 knots (26 km/h; 16 mph)
- Complement: 179
- Armament: 2 × twin 120 mm (4.7 in) guns; 2 × single 40 mm (1.6 in) AA guns; 1 × twin 13.2 mm (0.52 in) machine guns; 2 × triple 533 mm (21 in) torpedo tubes; 52 mines

Nembo was one of eight Turbine-class destroyer built for the Regia Marina (Royal Italian Navy) during the 1920s. Her name means nimbus. The ship played a minor role in the Spanish Civil War of 1936–1937, supporting the Nationalists.

== Design and description ==
The Turbine-class destroyers were enlarged and improved versions of the preceding Sauro class. They had an overall length of 93.2 meters (306 ft), a beam of 9.2 meters (30 ft 2 in) and a mean draft of 3 meters (9 ft 10 in). They displaced 1,090 metric tons (1,070 long tons) at standard load, and 1,700 metric tons (1,670 long tons) at deep load. Their complement was 12 officers and 167 enlisted men.

The Turbines were powered by two Parsons geared steam turbines, each driving one propeller shaft using steam supplied by three Thornycroft boilers. The turbines were rated at 40,000 shaft horsepower (30,000 kW) for a speed of 33 knots (61 km/h; 38 mph) in service, although Nembo reached a speed of 38.4 knots (71.1 km/h; 44.2 mph) during her sea trials while lightly loaded. They carried enough fuel oil to give them a range of 3,200 nautical miles (5,900 km; 3,700 mi) at a speed of 14 knots (26 km/h; 16 mph).

Their main battery consisted of four 120-millimeter (4.7 in) guns in two twin-gun turrets, one each fore and aft of the superstructure. Anti-aircraft (AA) defense for the Turbine-class ships was provided by a pair of 40-millimeter (1.6 in) AA guns in single mounts amidships and a twin-gun mount for 13.2-millimeter (0.52 in) machine guns. They were equipped with six 533-millimeter (21 in) torpedo tubes in two triple mounts amidships. The Turbines could carry 52 mines.

== Construction and career ==
Nembo was laid down by Cantieri Navali del Tirreno at their Riva Trigoso shipyard on 21 January 1925, launched on 27 January 1927 and completed on 14 October. Upon entry into the service with Regia Marina Nembo together with Turbine, Aquilone and Euro was assigned to the 2nd Squadron of the I Destroyer Flotilla based at La Spezia. Between 1929 and 1932 the 2nd Destroyer Division conducted training cruises in the Mediterranean Sea. In 1931 Nembo together with Euro, Espero and Zeffiro as well as old cruiser Ancona were part of II Naval Division.

In 1932, Nembo was among the first ships in the Italian Navy to receive a Galileo-Bergamini fire control system, designed by then-Captain Carlo Bergamini, commander of the 1st Destroyer Squadron (consisting of Nembo, Turbine, Euro and Aquilone), of which Nembo was the flagship at the time. Testing of fire control system on the 1st Squadron vessels was successful and led to the adoption of this system on a number of other Regia Marina ships.

In 1934 after another reorganization Nembo as well as Aquilone, Turbine and Euro were again reunited, now forming the 8th Destroyer Squadron, part of II Naval Division. In 1934 together with Turbine she was temporarily deployed to Red Sea to conduct training in tropical climate.

Between 1936 and 1938, Nembo participated in the Spanish Civil War, interdicting the delivery of supplies for the Spanish Republican forces by sea .

=== World War II ===
At the time of Italy entry into World War II Nembo together with Euro, Turbine and Aquilone formed 1st Destroyer Squadron based in Tobruk. Initially, she was assigned escort and anti-submarine duties.

On June 6, 1940, in preparation for hostilities, the ships of 1st Destroyer Squadron together with minelayer Bartletta laid fourteen minefields (540 mines) around Tobruk.

After an air reconnaissance revealed large number of ships present in Tobruk harbor, including several destroyers, British command ordered an air attack on Tobruk on June 12. The air strike was carried out by Blenheims from 45, 55, 113 and 211 Squadrons in the early morning hours of June 12. British bombers were intercepted by CR.32s from 92nd, 93rd and 94th Squadriglias, forcing some bombers to turn away, or drop their bombs prematurely. Several bombers managed to get through and bombed the harbor between 04:52 and 05:02 causing only negligible damage.

In response the Italian command ordered a bombardment of Sollum. The raid was carried out both by Regia Aeronautica and Regia Marina, with twelve SM.79 bombers dropping bombs in the early morning of June 15, while destroyers Nembo, Turbine and Aquilone shelled the town from 03:49 to 04:05, firing 220 shells of their main caliber, but dealing negligible damage to the installations due to thick fog present at the time of attack. Another bombardment of Sollum was performed between 05:35 and 06:18 on June 26 by the same destroyer group "with considerable effectiveness" expending 541 shells in the process.

On July 5, 1940 there were seven Turbine-class destroyers berthed in Tobruk harbor, including Nembo, together with four torpedo boats, six freighters and several auxiliary vessels. Between 10:00 to 11:15 a Short Sunderland reconnaissance plane overflew the harbor at an altitude of 1,500-2,000 meters and despite the anti-aircraft fire opened against it, confirmed the presence of numerous ships in the harbor. In the late afternoon a group of nine Fairey Swordfish torpedo bombers of 813 Naval Air Squadron took off from the airfield in Sidi Barrani and headed towards Tobruk. The air alarm was sounded at 20:06 but the Italians failed to detect the Allied aircraft until they were already over the harbor at 20:20. Destroyers had most of their personnel on board steamers Liguria and Sabbia with exception of dedicated air defense crews. The attack commenced a few minutes later, and lasted only seven minutes and resulted in five Italian ships being sunk or damaged. Not encountering any aerial opposition, British torpedo bombers attacked from low altitude (around 100 feet), and released their torpedoes from 400–500 meters away, almost point-blank. Zeffiro was attacked first by a plane piloted by Nicholas Kennedy, whose torpedo hit the destroyer in the bow, around the ammunition depot, between the bridge and a 120 mm cannon. The explosion broke the ship into two and sank it half an hour later. Freighter Manzoni was also hit, capsized and sank, while Euro and steamer Serenitas were hit, and had to be beached, and the ocean liner Liguria was hit and damaged. Two planes also attacked other destroyers, including Nembo, but failed to launch their torpedoes due to intense anti-aircraft fire. The air alarm was canceled at 21:31, and by that time all nine British planes were far away.

On 19 July 1940 British command, believing that the light cruiser Giovanni delle Bande Nere, damaged during the Battle of Cape Spada, had taken refuge in Tobruk, decided to launch a new bomber attack against the base. Nembo along with Aquilone and Ostro were berthed at the same location as during the July 5 raid. Most personnel was on board steamers Liguria and Sabbia with exception of dedicated air defense crews. Around 17:00 twelve Bristol Blenheim bombers from 55 Squadron and 211 Squadron RAF bombed the northern part of the harbor, slightly damaging an anti-aircraft battery and the port's facilities, and losing one aircraft. At 18:56 a seaplane from the 700 Naval Air Squadron launched by the British battleship Warspite appeared to investigate results of the bombing. The seaplane was immediately targeted by anti-aircraft batteries, and shot down. At 21:54 Tobruk was put on alert again after receiving reports from the Bardia and Sidi Belafarid advanced listening stations. Around 22:30 six Fairey Swordfish torpedo bombers from the 824 Naval Air Squadron FAA appeared in the skies above Tobruk harbor and were met with strong anti-aircraft fire. This forced the planes to make several passes over the area trying to avoid the fire, and also to acquire the targets, the situation exacerbated by a fairly cloudy night. The British finally managed to sort out their objectives by about 01:30 on July 20 and assumed attack formation at low altitude. At 01:32 steamer Sereno was struck in the stern by a torpedo, launched from a plane, piloted by squadron commander F.S. Quarry, causing her to slowly sink. At 01:34 Ostro was hit in her stern ammunition depot by a torpedo launched from another plane, causing the ship to go ablaze and sink ten minutes later. Nembo was hit by a torpedo at 01:37 and sank 8 minutes later with 25 of her crew being killed and four wounded. The British lost one plane in the attack which crash-landed on the way back in the Italian controlled territory.

The guns from both Nembo and Ostro were later removed and used by Italians to reinforce defenses of Bardia.

== Bibliography ==
- Brescia, Maurizio (2012). Mussolini's Navy: A Reference Guide to the Regina Marina 1930–45. Annapolis, Maryland: Naval Institute Press. ISBN 978-1-59114-544-8.
- Fraccaroli, Aldo (1968). Italian Warships of World War II. Shepperton, UK: Ian Allan. ISBN 0-7110-0002-6.
- Greene, Jack & Massignani, Alessandro (1998). The Naval War in the Mediterranean, 1940–1943. London: Chatham Publishing. ISBN 1-86176-057-4.
- McMurtrie, Francis E., ed. (1937). Jane's Fighting Ships 1937. London: Sampson Low. OCLC 927896922.
- O'Hara, Vincent P. (2009). Struggle for the Middle Sea: The Great Navies at War in the Mediterranean Theater, 1940–1945. Annapolis, Maryland: Naval Institute Press. ISBN 978-1-59114-648-3.
- Ramoino, Pier Paolo (September 2011). "La Regia Marina Tra le due Guerre Mondiali" (PDF). Rivista Marittima (Supplement). Archived from the original (PDF) on 29 August 2018.
- Roberts, John (1980). "Italy". In Chesneau, Roger (ed.). Conway's All the World's Fighting Ships 1922–1946. New York: Mayflower Books. pp. 280–317. ISBN 0-8317-0303-2.
- Rohwer, Jürgen (2005). Chronology of the War at Sea 1939–1945: The Naval History of World War Two (Third Revised ed.). Annapolis, Maryland: Naval Institute Press. ISBN 1-59114-119-2.
- Whitley, M. J. (1988). Destroyers of World War 2: An International Encyclopedia. Annapolis, Maryland: Naval Institute Press. ISBN 1-85409-521-8.
