= Turbine-class destroyer =

Italian naval ship class (1927–1943)

- Espero at anchor

Class overview
- Name: Turbine class
- Operators: Regia Marina; Kriegsmarine
- Preceded by: Sauro class
- Succeeded by: Navigatori class
- Built: 1925–1928
- In commission: 1927–1943
- Completed: 8
- Lost: 8

General characteristics (as built)
- Type: Destroyer
- Displacement: 1,090 t (1,070 long tons) (standard); 1,700 t (1,670 long tons) (full load)
- Length: 93.2 m (305 ft 9 in)
- Beam: 9.2 m (30 ft 2 in)
- Draught: 3 m (9 ft 10 in)
- Installed power: 3 Thornycroft boilers; 40,000 shp (30,000 kW)
- Propulsion: 2 shafts; 2 geared steam turbines
- Speed: 33 knots (61 km/h; 38 mph)
- Range: 3,200 nmi (5,900 km; 3,700 mi) at 14 knots (26 km/h; 16 mph)
- Complement: 179
- Armament: 2 × twin 120 mm (4.7 in) guns; 2 × single 40 mm (1.6 in) AA guns; 1 × twin 13.2 mm (0.52 in) machine guns; 2 × triple 533 mm (21 in) torpedo tubes; 52 mines

The Turbine-class destroyer was a group of eight destroyers built for the Regia Marina (Royal Italian Navy) in the 1920s. The ships played a minor role in the Spanish Civil War of 1936–1937, supporting the Nationalists. All the ships of the class were lost during World War II.

== Design and description ==
The Turbine-class destroyers were enlarged and improved versions of the preceding Sauro class. In an effort to improve their speed, they were lengthened and given more powerful propulsion machinery than the earlier ships. This provided more space for fuel oil which increased their endurance as well.

They had an overall length of 93.2 meters (306 ft), a beam of 9.2 meters (30 ft 2 in) and a mean draft of 3 meters (9 ft 10 in). They displaced 1,090 metric tons (1,070 long tons) at standard load, and 1,700 metric tons (1,670 long tons) at deep load. Their complement was 12 officers and 167 enlisted men.

The Turbines were powered by two Parsons geared steam turbines, each driving one propeller shaft using steam supplied by three Thornycroft boilers. The turbines were rated at 40,000 shaft horsepower (30,000 kW) for a speed of 33 knots (61 km/h; 38 mph) in service, although the ships reached speeds in excess of 36 knots (67 km/h; 41 mph) during their sea trials while lightly loaded. They carried 274 tonnes (270 long tons) of fuel oil which gave them a range of 3,200 nautical miles (5,900 km; 3,700 mi) at a speed of 14 knots (26 km/h; 16 mph).

Their main battery consisted of four 120-millimeter (4.7 in) guns in two twin-gun turrets, one each fore and aft of the superstructure. Anti-aircraft (AA) defense for the Turbine-class ships was provided by a pair of 40-millimeter (1.6 in) AA guns in single mounts amidships and a twin-gun mount for 13.2-millimeter (0.52 in) machine guns. They were equipped with six 533-millimeter (21 in) torpedo tubes in two triple mounts amidships. The Turbines could carry 52 mines.

== Ships ==
Construction data
Ship	Builder	Launched	Date of loss	Fate
Aquilone	Odero	3 August 1927	17 September 1940	Sunk on mines laid by aircraft from HMS Illustrious outside Benghazi harbour with a loss of 13 men.
Borea	Ansaldo	28 January 1927	17 September 1940	Sunk by aircraft from HMS Illustrious in Benghazi harbour with a loss of one man.
Espero	Ansaldo	31 August 1927	28 June 1940	Sunk by HMAS Sydney off Tobruk during a troop transport mission to Tobruk.
Euro	CNT	7 July 1927	3 October 1943	Sunk by German aircraft off Leros, Greece.
Nembo	CNT	27 January 1927	20 July 1940	Sunk by Swordfish torpedo bombers from HMS Eagle in Tobruk harbour with a loss of 25 men.
Ostro	Ansaldo	2 January 1928	20 July 1940	Sunk by Swordfish torpedo bombers from HMS Eagle in Tobruk harbour with a loss of 42 men.
Turbine	Odero	21 April 1927	16 September 1944	Sunk by rockets fired by USAAF aircraft in Salamis.
Zeffiro	Ansaldo	27 May 1927	5 July 1940	Sunk by Swordfish torpedo bombers from HMS Eagle in Tobruk with a loss of 21 men.

== History ==
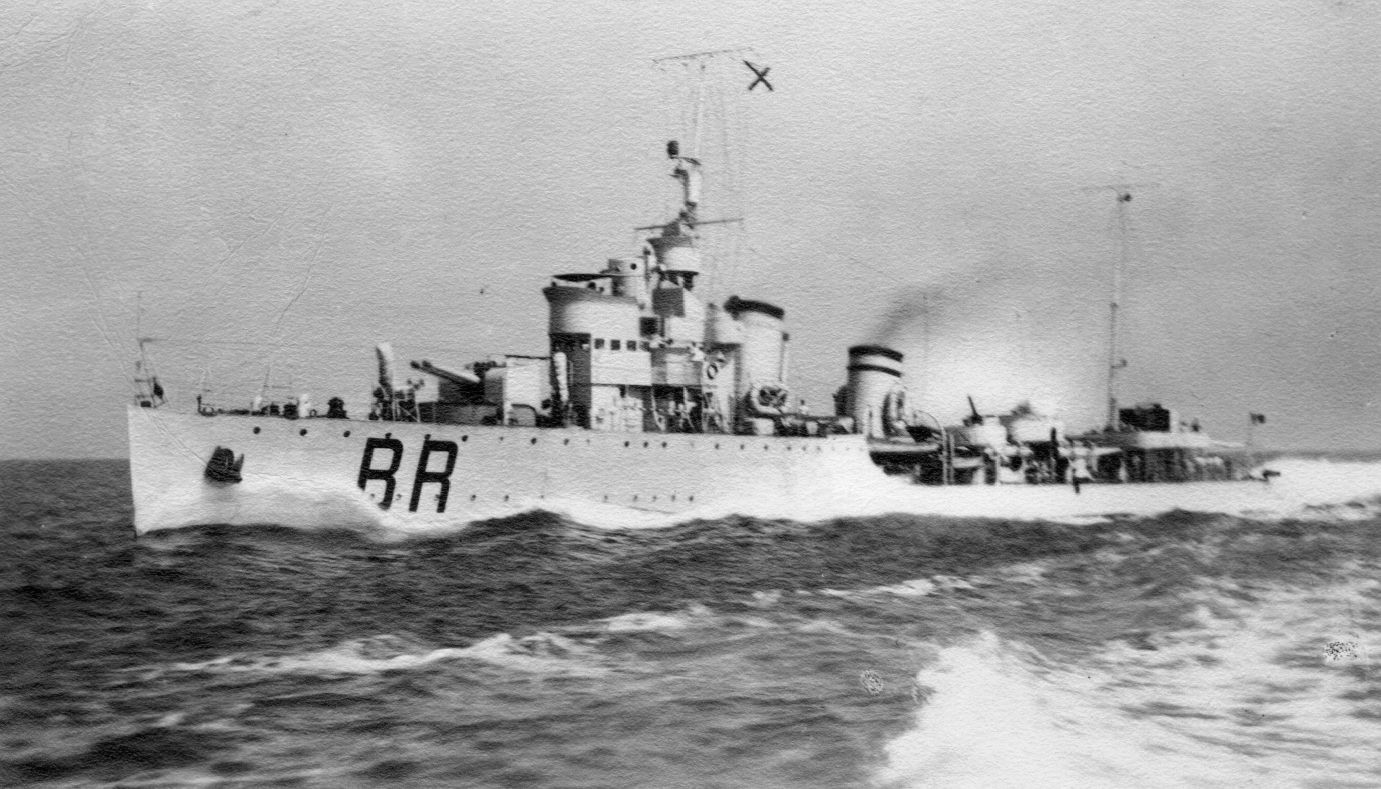
Borea at high speed

During the Spanish Civil War, the Italians supported the Spanish Nationalists not only by assisting them with war supplies, but also through undercover operations against enemy shipping. In the course of these missions, the destroyer Ostro torpedoed and sank the Spanish Republican freighter SS Conde de Abasolo on 13 August 1937, while Turbine sank the Soviet cargo ship Timiryazev by the same means on 30 August, both of them off the coast of French Algeria.

When Italy declared war against Britain and France during World War II, all eight ships of the Turbine class were based in Tobruk, Libya. They were tasked with mine laying duties and transporting supplies from Taranto to Tobruk. On 16 June 1940, Turbine sank the British submarine HMS Orpheus just off Tobruk.

Turbine, Aquilone, and Nembo took part in the shelling of the Egyptian port of Sollum on 14 June 1940. They repeated this action on 26 June.

On 28 June 1940, Espero, Ostro, and Zeffiro were in convoy, heavily loaded down with cargo, when they were intercepted by a British task force of five ships. In the ensuing battle, HMAS Sydney sank Espero as it lagged behind to allow the other two destroyers to reach Benghazi and later Tobruk safely.

On 5 July 1940, the British aircraft carrier HMS Eagle attacked Tobruk harbor. Its Fairey Swordfish torpedo bombers sank Zeffiro, and severely damaged Euro. Later that month, on 20 July, during another attack on Tobruk harbour, Swordfish from HMS Eagle torpedoed and sank both Nembo and Ostro. On 17 September of the same year, Swordfish from HMS Illustrious attacked Benghazi harbor where Aquilone and Borea were berthed, and both were sunk. Euro was part of the escort of the ill-fated Duisburg convoy, when her commander lost the opportunity of torpedoing the cruiser HMS Aurora due to an error of identification. On 3 July 1942, while escorting three freighters from Taranto to Benghazi along with the Navigatori-class destroyer Da Verrazzano, Euro and Turbine shot down two Beaufort bombers.

After Italy signed the Armistice of Cassibile in September 1943, Euro participated in the Battle of Leros where she was sunk by German Junkers Ju 87 "Stuka" dive bombers during an air raid on 3 October 1943. Turbine was seized by the Kriegsmarine and put into service in the Aegean Sea as a torpedo boat. On 19 June 1944, at Porto Lago, she was badly damaged by an explosion, which was thought to have been sabotage. She set in to the port of Salamis for repairs, but a US air strike on the port on 16 September sank her before they could be entirely completed.

== Bibliography ==
- Brescia, Maurizio (2012). Mussolini's Navy: A Reference Guide to the Regina Marina 1930–45. Annapolis, Maryland: Naval Institute Press. ISBN 978-1-59114-544-8.
- Campbell, John (1985). Naval Weapons of World War Two. Annapolis, Maryland: Naval Institute Press. ISBN 0-87021-459-4.
- Fraccaroli, Aldo (1968). Italian Warships of World War II. Shepperton, UK: Ian Allan. ISBN 0-7110-0002-6.
- Greene, Jack & Massignani, Alessandro (1998). The Naval War in the Mediterranean, 1940–1943. London: Chatham Publishing. ISBN 1-86176-057-4.
- Gustavsson, Hakan (2010). Desert Prelude 1940-41: Early Clashes. Casemate Publishers. ISBN 978-8389450524.
- McMurtrie, Francis E., ed. (1937). Jane's Fighting Ships 1937. London: Sampson Low. OCLC 927896922.
- Roberts, John (1980). "Italy". In Chesneau, Roger (ed.). Conway's All the World's Fighting Ships 1922–1946. New York: Mayflower Books. pp. 280–317. ISBN 0-8317-0303-2.
- Rohwer, Jürgen (2005). Chronology of the War at Sea 1939–1945: The Naval History of World War Two (Third Revised ed.). Annapolis, Maryland: Naval Institute Press. ISBN 1-59114-119-2.
- Whitley, M. J. (1988). Destroyers of World War 2: An International Encyclopedia. Annapolis, Maryland: Naval Institute Press. ISBN 1-85409-521-8.
