= No. 55 Squadron RAF =

Defunct flying squadron of the Royal Air Force

- Squadron badge
- Active: 27 April 1917 – 1 April 1918 (RFC); 1 April 1918 – 22 January 1920 (RAF); 1 February 1920 – 1 November 1946; 1 Sept 1960 – 15 October 1993; 15 October 1993 – 31 March 1996; 1 November 1996 – 20 January 2011
- Country: United Kingdom
- Branch: Royal Air Force
- Type: Flying squadron
- Mottos: Latin: Nil nos tremefacit (Nothing shakes us)
- Battle honours: Western Front (1917–1918)*, Arras, Ypres (1917)*, Independent Force and Germany (1918)*, Iraq (1920), Kurdistan (1922–1924), Iraq (1928–1929), Kurdistan (1930–1931), Northern Kurdistan (1932), Egypt and Libya (1940–1943)*, El Alamein*, El Hamma*, North Africa (1943), Sicily (1943), Salerno, Italy (1943–1945), Gustav Line, Gothic Line, South Atlantic (1982), Gulf (1991)*; *Honours marked with an asterisk may be emblazoned on the Squadron Standard

Insignia
- Badge: A cubit arm, the arm grasping a spear

Number 55 Squadron was a flying squadron of the Royal Air Force (RAF). First formed in April 1917, the squadron saw action on the Western Front during the First World War. Based in the Middle East during the interwar period and the Second World War, No. 55 Squadron saw action over Iraq, Egypt, Libya and Italy. Between 1960 and 1993, the unit flew the Handley Page Victor. Initially on the Victor B.1A before becoming a tanker squadron in 1965 with the Victor B(K).1A/K.1/K.1A before converting to the Victor K.2 in 1975. Disbanding in October 1993, No. 55 Squadron were the last RAF unit to operate the Victor. Between 1996 and 2011, No. 55(Reserve) Squadron operated the Hawker Siddeley Dominie T.1 from RAF Cranwell, Lincolnshire, helping to train navigators for the RAF.

== History ==
=== First World War ===
No. 55 Squadron was formed during the First World War at Castle Bromwich, West Midlands, on 27 April 1916; 110 years ago. It initially operated as a training unit, flying a mixture of aircraft types, including the Avro 504, Royal Aircraft Factory B.E.2, and the Armstrong Whitworth F.K.8, but in January 1917 it changed its role to a day-bomber squadron, and re-equipped with the Airco DH.4, being the first squadron to receive the new light bomber.

It took these to the Western Front in France on 6 March that year as part of 9th Wing, flying its first bombing mission against Valenciennes railway station on 23 April 1917 in support of the Battle of Arras. Having been based at Tantonville where muddy conditions hampered operations, it moved at the beginning of June 1918 to Azelot. It became part of the Independent Air Force as part of No 41 Wing, carrying out daylight strategic bombing missions against targets in Germany, along with reconnaissance duties. 55 Squadron developed tactics of flying in wedge formations, bombing on the leader's command and with the massed defensive fire of the formation deterring attacks by enemy fighters. Despite heavy losses, 55 Squadron continued in operation, the only one of the day bombing squadrons in the Independent Force which did not have to temporarily stand down owing to aircrew losses. The squadron flew 221 bombing missions during the war, dropping approximately 141 long tons (143,000 kilograms) of bombs during the war.

Following the Armistice on 11 November 1918, 55 Squadron was briefly used to run airmail services to British forces, before returning to the United Kingdom and relinquishing its aircraft in January 1919, formally disbanding on 22 January 1920.

=== Between the Wars ===
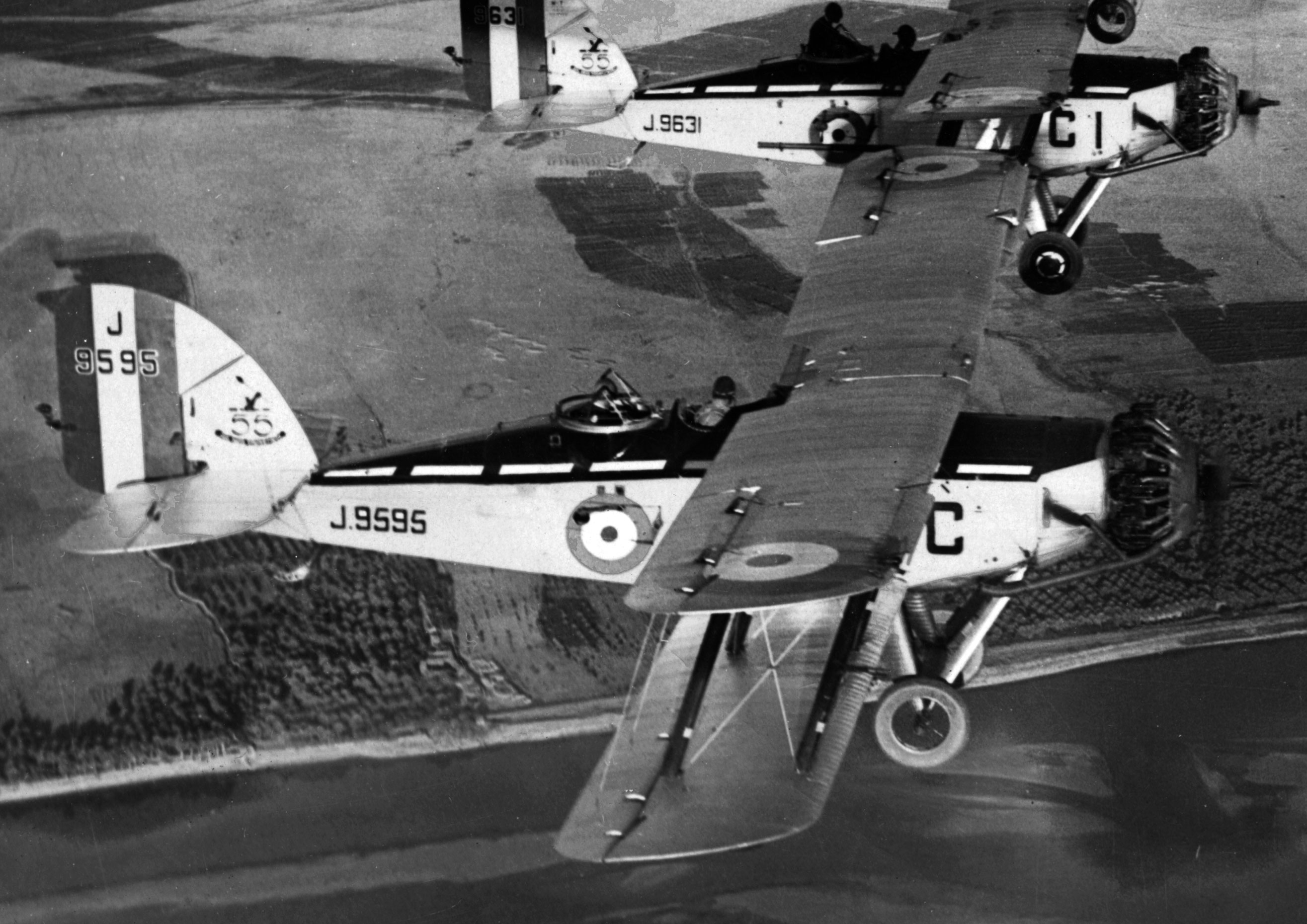
A pair of No. 55 Squadron Westland Wapiti Mk.IIas during the 1930s.

The squadron reformed on 1 February 1920, when No. 142 Squadron, based at Suez and equipped with Airco DH.9s was renumbered. It started to receive more capable Airco DH.9As in June 1920, and was equipped with a mixture of DH.9s and DH.9As when it transferred to Turkey onboard HMS Ark Royal in July to support the 'Q Force' of the British Army who were defending Constantinople and the Dardanelles.

55 Squadron moved to Iraq in August 1920 to take up 'air policing' duties. It arrived in Baghdad in September 1920, discarding its remaining DH.9s to standardise on the DH.9A. The squadron moved to Mosul in March 1921, and to RAF Hinaidi in May 1924. It remained in Iraq for 19 years, on occasion flying air policing operations against rebelling tribesmen.

Between April 1923 and May 1935, a period when No. 55 Squadron was either based at Mosul or RAF Hinaidi, twenty-six men of the squadron lost their lives and were buried at the Hinaidi RAF Peace Cemetery (name changed to Ma’Asker Al Raschid RAF Cemetery in 1961). Some of the men died at Mosul and were initially buried there but they were all later reinterred at Ma’Asker, since RAF Hinaidi was at that time the centre of operations for all British Forces in Mesopotamia.

Considering the distance between Mosul and Baghdad (220 miles by air and 250 miles by road), moving the bodies to RAF Hinaidi came at the risk of being attacked by hostile tribesmen. The causes of death for the twenty-six men were varied, resulting from action against insurgents, flying accidents, illness and even suicide. Of all the RAF squadrons with men buried at the Ma’Asker cemetery, 55 squadron is the most represented, accounting for almost 9 percent of the three hundred burials.

Seventy-seven identifiable headstones have survived at the long abandoned Ma’Asker Al Raschid RAF Cemetery, with nine for 55 Squadron men.

The ageing DH.9As of 55 Squadron were replaced by Westland Wapitis in February 1930, which in turn were replaced by Vickers Vincents in 1937, taking these to RAF Habbaniya in September that year.

It finally received modern monoplanes in March 1939, when it received twin-engined Bristol Blenheim bombers, transferring to Egypt just before the outbreak of the Second World War.

=== Second World War ===
No. 55 Squadron flew its Bristol Blenheims on shipping patrols over the Gulf of Suez, until Italy declared war in June 1940, when 55 Squadron changed to operations against bombing targets in Libya. On 11 June 1940, the unit participated in the first attack by the Royal Air Force on the Italian air force base at El Adem, where 18 aircraft were destroyed or damaged on the ground, against the loss of three British aircraft from three squadrons. It changed to anti-shipping operations in September 1941, continuing these operations until it was withdrawn from operations in March 1942 for conversion to Martin Baltimores, after which it returned to the bombing role. The squadron continued in support of the Eighth Army for the remainder of the North African campaign.

It flew its Baltimores on bombing raids in support of the Allied invasion of Sicily, and the subsequent invasion of Italy. The last plane to conduct a bombing during the Italian campaign was a Yugoslav-crewed Baltimore of the No. 55 Squadron. The squadron re-equipped with Boston light bombers in October 1944. The squadron moved to Hassani in Greece in September 1945, replacing its Bostons with de Havilland Mosquitos in June 1946. 55 Squadron disbanded in December 1946, and was removed from the RAF's Order of Battle.

=== Handley Page Victor ===
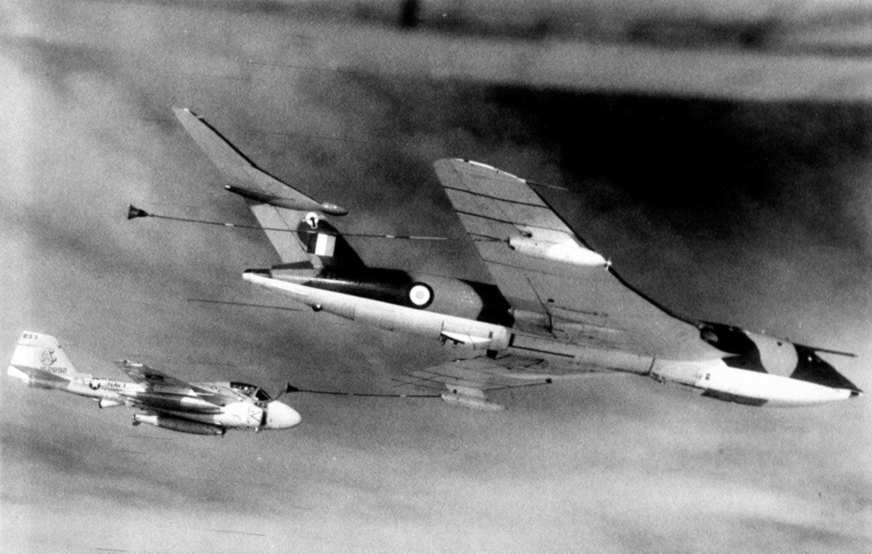
A 55 Squadron Handley Page Victor K1 refuels a US Navy KA-6D Intruder from VA-65, in 1971.

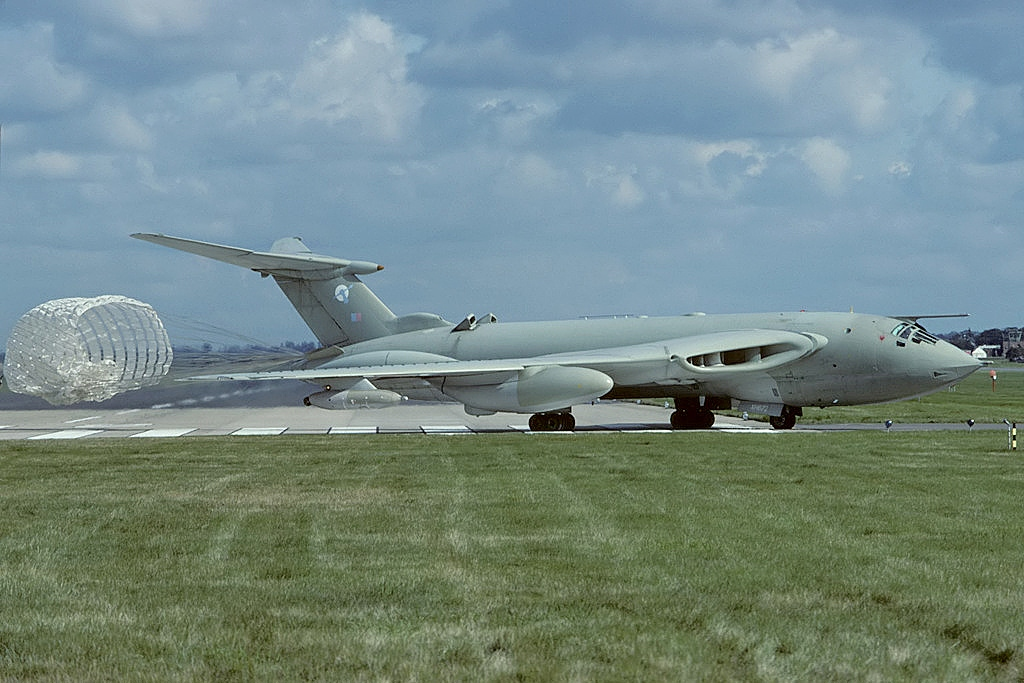
55 Squadron Handley Page Victor K2 'XH672' trails its brake chute after landing at RAF Marham, 1993.

Following a hiatus of nearly fourteen years, No. 55 Squadron reformed at RAF Honington in Suffolk on 1 September 1960 equipped with the Handley Page Victor B.1A, becoming part of the V bomber force of RAF Bomber Command. When the Vickers Valiant (a V force stable-mate) was grounded in December 1964 owing to metal fatigue, the Royal Air Force lost its aerial refuelling tanker force, and a rush programme was launched to convert Victor B.1s to fill the tanker gap. From May 1965, when 55 Squadron moved to RAF Marham in Norfolk, it received six interim two-point Victor BK.1A tanker conversions, allowing it to become operational in the air-to-air refuelling tanker role in August 1965. It had replaced the interim BK.1As with the definitive three-point tankers (Victor K.1 and K.1A) by December 1966, retaining them until 1975, when they were replaced by the more powerful Victor K.2.

55 Squadron provided aerial tanker support during Operation Corporate, the Falklands War in 1982. This notably included the Operation Black Buck raids on Stanley Airfield, where alongside 57 Squadron, its fellow Victor squadron, they refuelled Avro Vulcan bombers multiple times to allow them to reach the Falkland Islands from Ascension Island, at that time the longest bombing raid in history. 55 Squadron's Victors went to war again in 1991, when it was deployed to the Persian Gulf as part of Operation Granby, the United Kingdom's response to the Iraqi invasion of Kuwait, refuelling British and coalition aircraft during Operation Desert Storm. 55 Squadron disbanded on 15 October 1993, the last squadron to operate the Victor.

=== Training roles ===
On the same day as No. 55 Squadron disbanded as a Victor squadron, 241 Operational Conversion Unit at RAF Brize Norton was renumbered No. 55 (Reserve) Squadron. This OCU was responsible for training Vickers VC10 and Lockheed TriStar crews, although it had no aircraft of its own. Disbanding again on 31 March 1996, it reformed at RAF Cranwell on 1 November 1996 when the navigation squadron of No. 3 Flying Training School, flying Hawker Siddeley Dominie T.1, weapon systems officer (WSO) and weapon systems operators (WSOp) trainers, adopted its identity.

The Dominie T.1 was withdrawn from service, and the squadron disbanded, when WSO and WSOp training ended on 20 January 2011.
