= Cantiere navale di Riva Trigoso =

Shipyard in Liguria, Italy

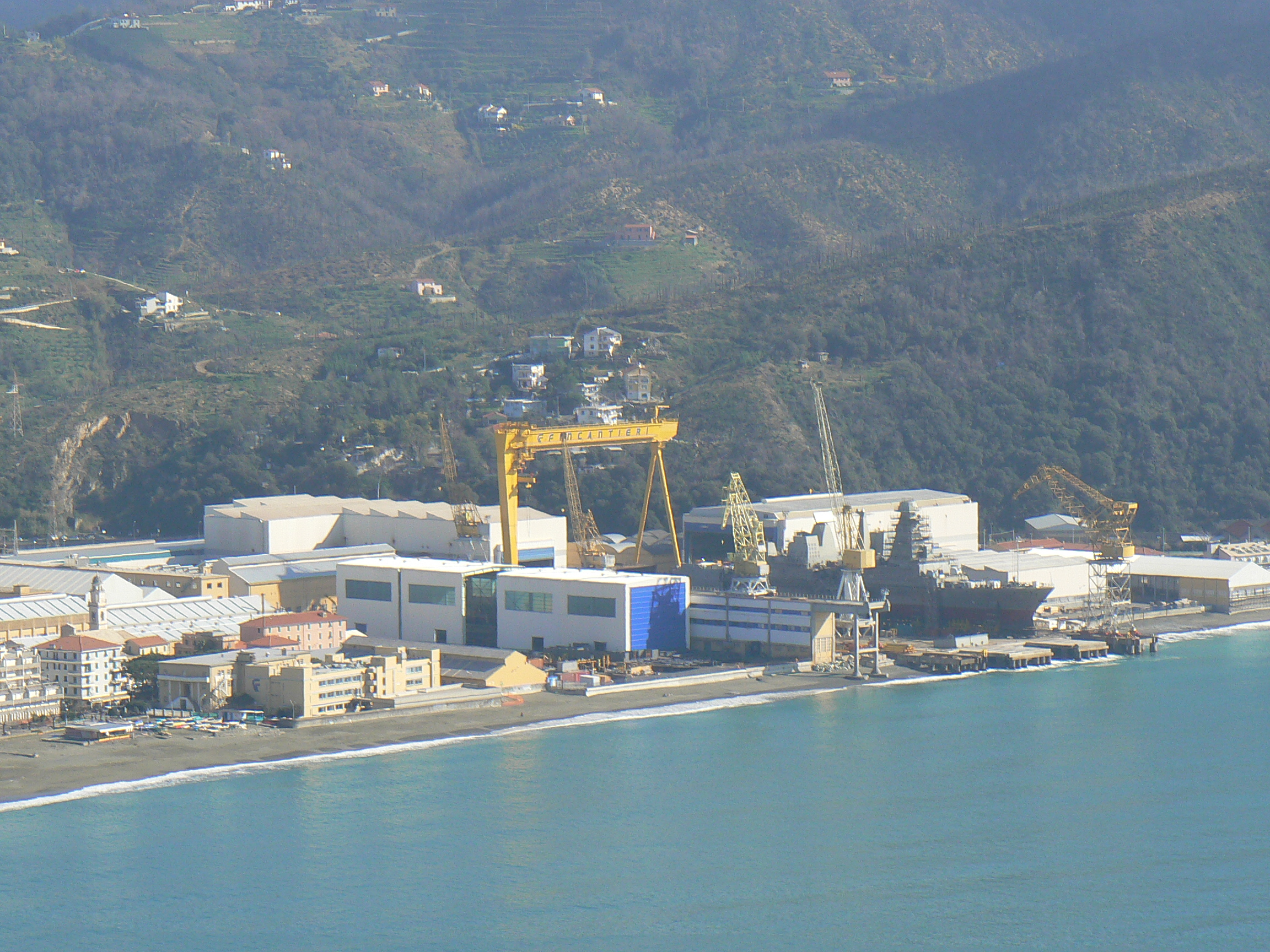
- Industry: Shipbuilding
- Founded: 1897
- Headquarters: Sestri Levante, Italy
- Parent: Fincantieri

Cantiere navale di Riva Trigoso (lit. 'Riva Trigoso Shipyard') is an Italian shipyard. Founded on 1 August 1897 by Erasmo Piaggio's Società Esercizio Bacini, a drydock-operating company, in Sestri Levante, Liguria, Italy, it mostly built commercial ships. In 1925 the Piaggio heirs decided to spin off the drydock business and the company was renamed Cantieri del Tirreno. It diversified into building warships and was heavily damaged during World War II.

The shipyard was merged into Italcantieri in 1973 and then into Fincantieri in 1984.

== Bibliography ==
- Brescia, Maurizio (2012). Mussolini's Navy: A Reference Guide to the Regina Marina 1930–45. Annapolis, Maryland: Naval Institute Press. ISBN 978-1-59114-544-8.
