= Battle of the Espero Convoy =

WWII battle between Italy and the Allies

- Part of The Battle of the Mediterranean of the Second World War
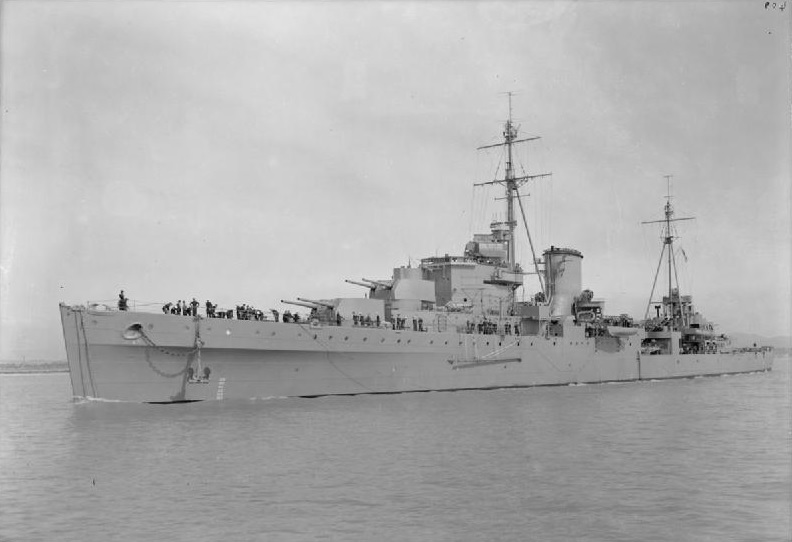
- HMS Orion, c. 1942
Date	28 June 1940
Location	Off Crete, Mediterranean 35°08′16.36″N 20°34′37.27″E
Result	See Aftermath

Belligerents
United Kingdom; Australia	Italy

Commanders and leaders
John Tovey	Enrico Baroni †

Strength
5 light cruisers (4 British, 1 Australian)	3 destroyers

Casualties and losses
1 light cruiser damaged	205 killed; 44 captured; 1 destroyer sunk

The Battle of the Espero Convoy (Battaglia del convoglio Espero) on 28 June 1940, was the first surface engagement between Italian and Allied warships of the Second World War. Three 36 kn (67 km/h; 41 mph) Italian destroyers made a dash from Taranto for Tobruk in Libya to transport Blackshirt (Milizia Volontaria per la Sicurezza Nazionale) anti-tank units, in case of an armoured attack from Egypt by the British.

By coincidence, the Mediterranean Fleet was at sea to conduct a destroyer anti-submarine sweep around Crete and provide cover for three Allied convoys to Egypt, one from Turkey and two from Malta. British aircraft from Malta spotted the Italian destroyers and the 7th Cruiser Squadron turned to intercept them; a running fight took place south-west of Crete, in which the destroyers were impeded by their cargoes and an adverse sea.

The Italian destroyer Espero (Captain Enrico Baroni) was sunk while covering the escape of the destroyers Zeffiro and Ostro to Benghazi; 53 of the 225 crew and passengers were rescued, three of whom later died of their wounds. The British and Australian cruisers expended a huge amount of ammunition and the Malta convoys had to be postponed until they had replenished from the eight hundred 6-inch shells in reserve. Convoy AS 1 from Turkey arrived safely by 3 July.

== Background ==
=== Italian belligerence ===
Libyan ports

Supply shipments to Italian Libya (Libia Italiana) were landed at the ports of Tripoli [2,000 long tons (2,000 t) per day], Benghazi [1,000 long tons (1,000 t) per day] and Tobruk with a capacity of less than 1,000 long tons (1,000 t) per day, with some deliveries possible to Derna and Bardia. Once landed, supplies and men had to be moved by lorry or small coastal craft. In late 1939, assuming overwhelming Anglo-French naval superiority, Marshal Pietro Badoglio, the Chief of Staff of the Italian Army, established a policy of maintaining internal security and to have supplies sufficient for a year. On 9 April, Badoglio met the three service chiefs and announced the

...firm decision of the Duce to intervene at such time and in such places as he will choose.

— Badoglio

and ordered that the Regio Esercito (Italian Royal Army) was to remain on the defensive as the Regia Marina and the Regia Aeronautica (Italian Royal Air Force) conducted offensive operations. On 30 May, Badoglio ordered the service chiefs to be ready for hostilities by 5 June. Italian war aims were to fight parallel with Germany, to dominate the Balkans, establish a land route to Italian East Africa (Africa Orientale Italiana) and assure access to Spain and the Black Sea.

=== Italian sea communications ===
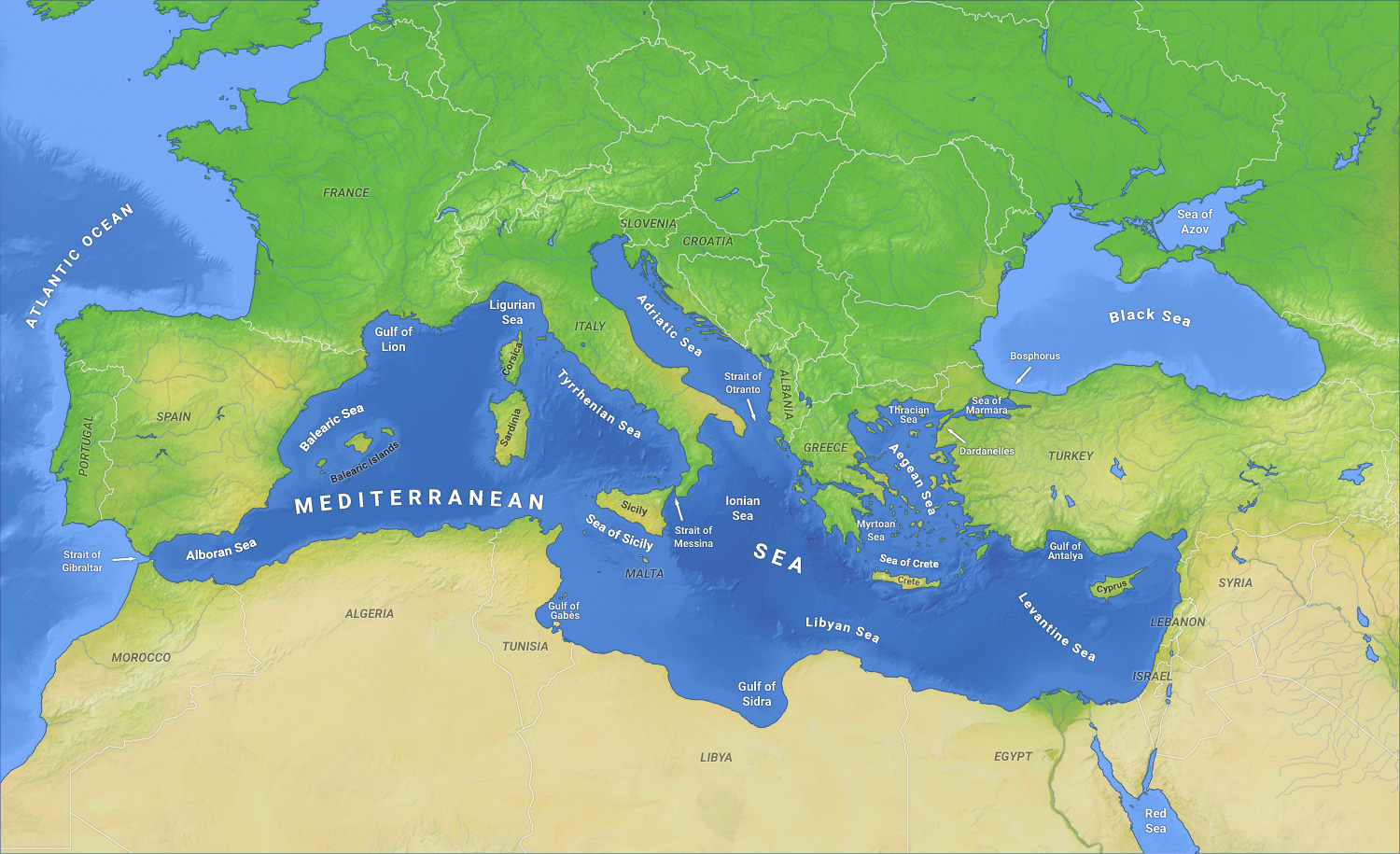
Map of the Mediterranean Sea, showing main bodies of water

On 11 April, the naval chief of staff, Admiral Domenico Cavagnari, reported his doubts about the possibility of offensive action against opponents who could replace losses far quicker than Italy. Going to war with a defensive strategy was unprecedented and at the end of the war, Italy might have no territorial gains, no navy and no air force. The navy planned to keep its forces concentrated to generate maximum firepower, which precluded the protection of merchant shipping, except on rare occasions; the French to the west and British to the east meant that convoying ships from Italy to Libya would be impossible. Benito Mussolini saw off such doubts by predicting a war of three months' duration, when Libya had six months' supplies.

Only on 10 June did Mussolini direct that the military forces in Italian Libya be reinforced for offensive operations and that the Regia Marina was to protect the supply routes in the central Mediterranean. On 13 June, the first request arrived from Libya for the dispatch of "indispensable" supplies. In 1940, the Regia Marina had two modernised battleships and 19 cruisers to challenge the British and French Mediterranean fleets of three aircraft carriers, eleven battleships and 23 cruisers, a superiority of 4:1 in tonnage, which could be reinforced from outside the Mediterranean at will. The British ships were based at Gibraltar and Alexandria, with no ships based at Malta and the French at Toulon and Bizerte, the main Italian bases being Naples and Taranto, with small forces based in Sicilian ports. The Italian forces could unite by sailing through the Strait of Messina but the narrows were an obvious place for an ambush.

=== Air power ===
The Regia Marina had advocated for the retention of a naval air arm after the First World War but with the creation of the Regia Aeronautica in 1923, lost control of naval aviation. The proponents of land-based air power disdained the naval preference for aircraft carriers and specialist aircraft, in favour of land-based aircraft fulfilling the requirements of maritime aviation, apart from an acceptance of the need for reconnaissance by "Aviation for the Navy" in which the navy had operational control and sent observers aloft. The Regia Aeronautica followed the theory of independent air operations "according to its own rules" and paid insufficient attention to the needs of the Regia Marina. Promising experiments with air-launched torpedoes from 1918 to 1922 were stifled by the new independent air force and even after the example of the British Fleet Air Arm experiments with torpedo-bombers, attempts by the Regia Marina in 1938 to gain control of a naval torpedo-bomber force failed.

== Prelude ==
=== Italian naval operations ===
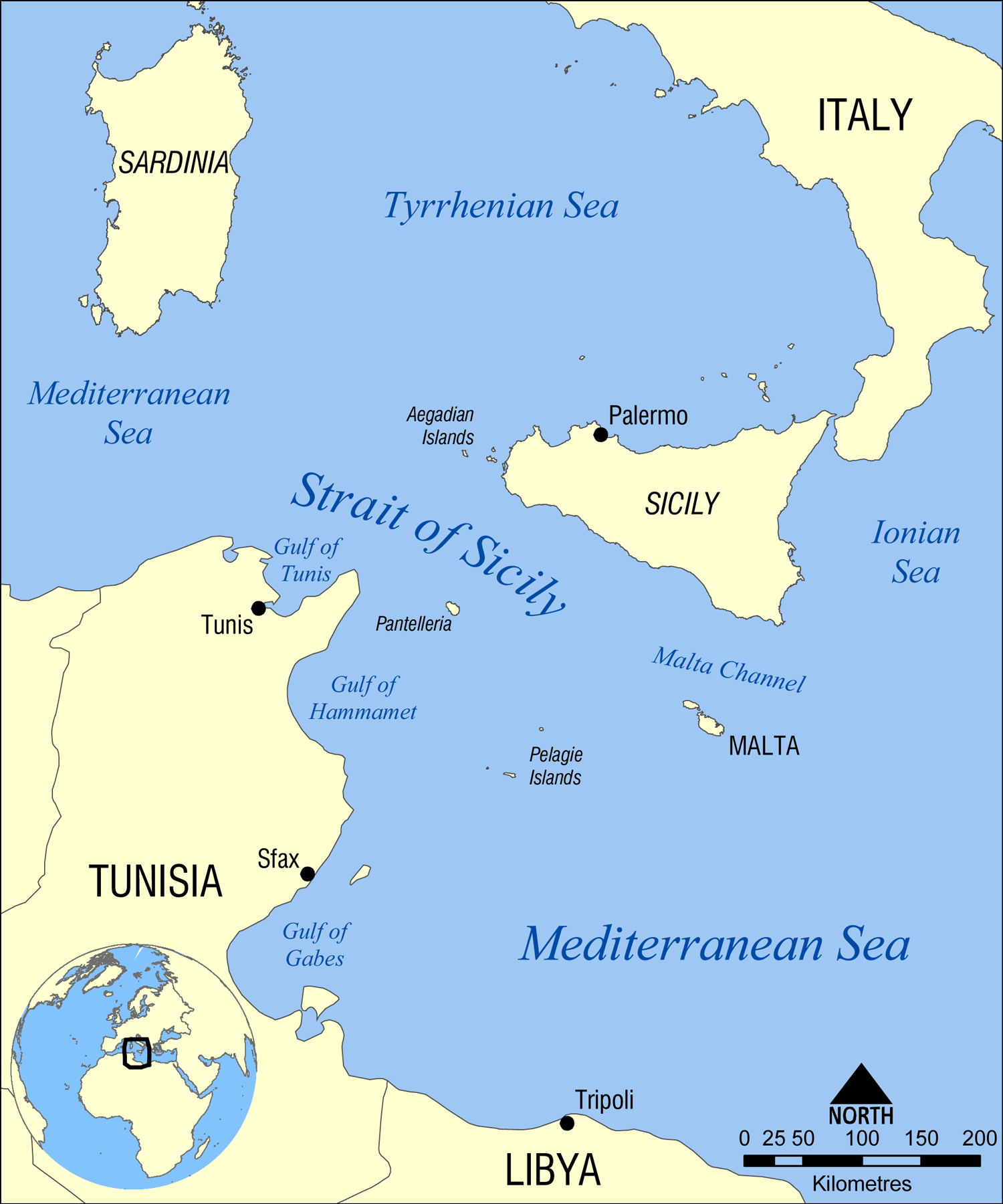
Map showing the Strait of Sicily

On 10 June 1940, Italy declared war on Britain and France. Badoglio expected a British advance into Cyrenaica (eastern Libya) led by armoured forces. On 11 June, the 3rd and 7th Cruiser divisions conducted an abortive patrol in the Strait of Sicily; next morning, two British cruisers were spotted south of Crete heading west and the 3rd Cruiser Division and two destroyer squadrons were sent to patrol the route to Malta. The 1st and 8th Cruiser squadrons patrolled the Ionian Sea and two destroyer squadrons sailed between Sicily and Malta. On 12 June, an Italian Giovanni Berta-class naval trawler was sunk off Tobruk by two British cruisers and four destroyers; the Italian submarine Alpino Bagnolini sank HMS Calypso south of Crete. From 11 June to 16 August, the specialist Orata Group dredged up the seven British cables from the seabed around Malta and took away thousands of yards to prevent them from being reconnected.

=== Italian supply operations ===
The difficulty of escorting merchant ships to Tobruk led to a decision to use warships and submarines. On 19 June, the Italian submarine Zoea sailed for Tobruk carrying ammunition; the next day, a destroyer squadron led by Artigliere, departed Augusta for Benghazi, carrying troops and anti-tank guns. On 25 June a convoy with escorts left Naples for Tripoli with 1,727 troops and supplies; the submarine Marcantonio Bragadin departed for Libya with equipment for the airfield at Tobruk. The Italian Turbine class destroyers of the 2nd Destroyer Squadron, Espero (flagship, capitano di vascello Enrico Baroni), Zeffiro and Ostro were chosen to transport anti-tank units for their high speed [36 kn (67 km/h; 41 mph)] and loading capacity. (Note: In 2009, Vincent O'Hara wrote that they were anti-aircraft units with 120 men, ten Breda Model 35 20 mm anti-aircraft guns and 450,000 rounds of ammunition.) Two smaller First World War-era escort vessels, Rosolino Pilo and Giuseppe Missori with 52 troops and more supplies, departed Taranto independently for Tobruk some hours later.

=== Operation MA 3 ===
On 27 June, five destroyers were to sail from Alexandria on an anti-submarine sweep near the Ionian island of Kythira off the western cast of Greece and then sail on to Malta to form the close escort for Convoy MF 1 [13 kn (24 km/h; 15 mph)] and Convoy MS 2 to Alexandria. Intelligence about Italian submarines led to the sweep being diverted through the Kasos Strait east of Crete, then north of the island, thence past Kythira to Malta. Sunderland flying boats of 201 Group RAF, based in Malta, were to co-operate with the naval operations in the Ionian Sea. On the Italian declaration of war, the passenger liner El Nil 7,769 GRT, en route for Egypt from Marseille, Knight of Malta and an interned Italian ship Rodi were in Malta; in Operation MA 3 these ships formed the fast Convoy MF 1.

Five slower ships, Zeeland, Kirkland, Masirah, Novasli and Tweed, carrying naval stores for Alexandria, formed the slow Convoy MS 1 [9 kn (17 km/h; 10 mph)] to depart from Malta for Alexandria. Convoy MF 1 carried civilians being evacuated from Malta and the Mediterranean Fleet was to sortie to protect them in Operation MA 5. Convoy AS 1, with seven ships, was to sail from the Dardanelles to Egypt, four ships joining from Salonika, Piraeus and Smyrna (İzmir), escorted by the light cruisers HMS Capetown and Caledon of the 3rd Cruiser Squadron and the destroyers HMS Garland, Nubian, Mohawk and Vampire, due to depart from Cape Helles early on 28 June.

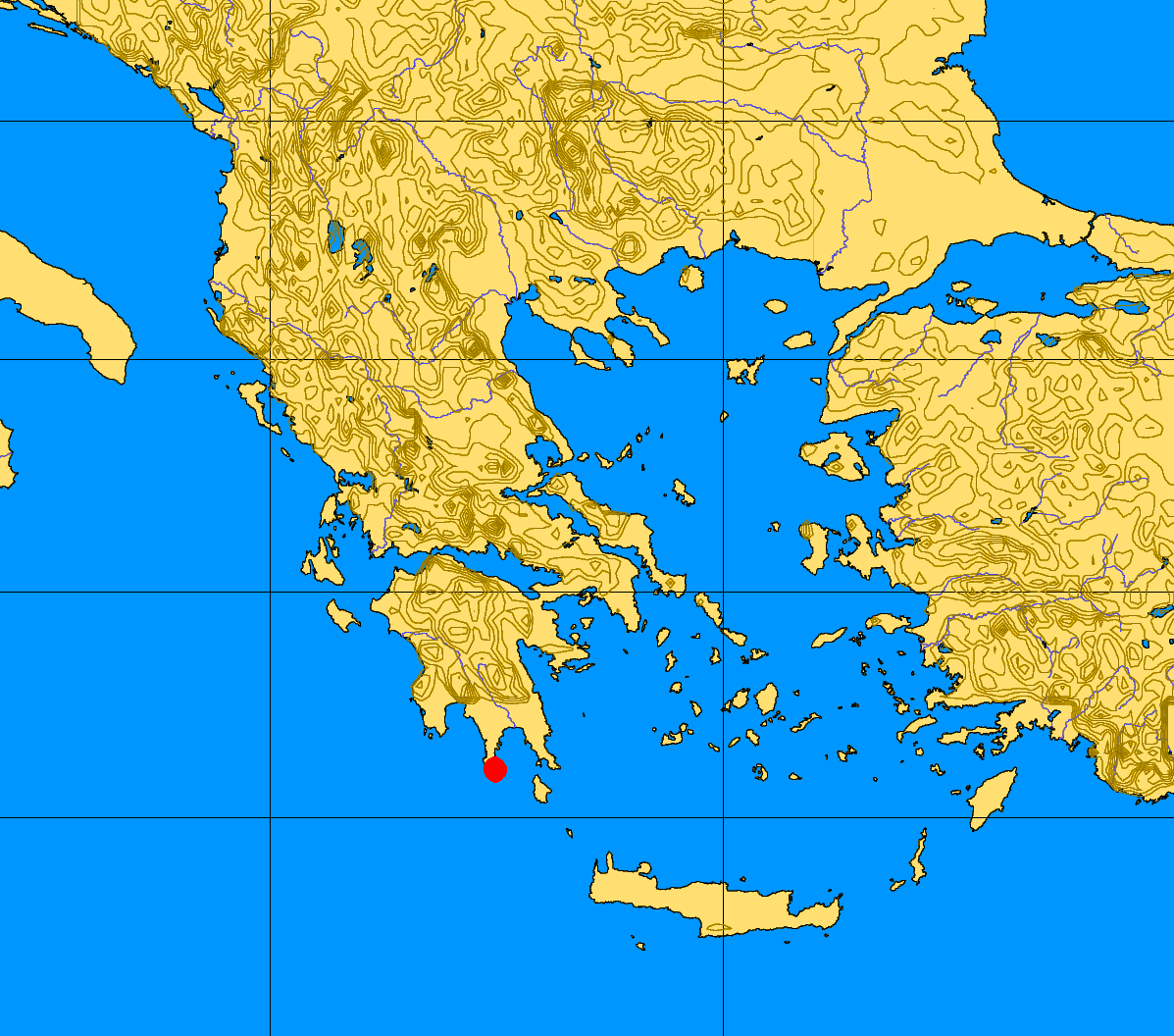
Cape Matapan (in red)

The timing of the departures was arranged so that on 30 June the three convoys would be at Position K (35°N, 22°E), south of Cape Matapan, about halfway between Malta and Alexandria. Five cruisers of the 7th Cruiser Squadron (also known as Force C, Vice-Admiral John Tovey) with the 1st Cruiser Division, the Leander class cruisers (eight 6-inch guns) HMS Orion (flagship), Neptune, HMAS Sydney and the 2nd Cruiser Division, the Town (Gloucester) class cruisers (twelve 6-inch guns) Liverpool and Gloucester, were to sail west of Crete near Position K.

The 1st Battle Squadron (Rear-Admiral Henry Pridham-Wippell) with HMS Royal Sovereign, Ramillies, the aircraft carrier HMS Eagle and the 2nd Destroyer Flotilla, were to be south-west of Crete, also near Position K, ready to intervene according to circumstances. At 6:00 p.m. on 26 June, Caledon, Garland and Vampire sailed from Alexandria to rendezvous with Capetown, Nubian and Mohawk the next day while heading for the Dardanelles. A dawn on 27 June, five ships of the 2nd Destroyer Flotilla departed Alexandria and at 11:00 a.m., the 7th Cruiser Squadron left for Position K.

=== 27 June ===
The launch of Console Generale Liuzzi, 17 September 1939

As the sun set, the 2nd Destroyer Flotilla of HMAS Voyager, HMS Dainty, Decoy, Defender and Ilex were 200 nmi (370 km; 230 mi) north of Alexandria. At 6:28 p.m. while 100 nmi (190 km; 120 mi) south-east of Crete, the flotilla spotted a submarine, Console Generale Liuzzi, which quickly dived. Four of the destroyers made depth-charge attacks and after the fifth an oil slick was seen and trailed by Dainty. The submarine had been badly damaged by the depth charging and was eventually forced to the surface. After a hunt of ninety minutes the submarine was seen again at a range of 2,500 yd (2,300 m) and two destroyers opened fire.

A white light was taken to indicate surrender; Dainty moved closer and began to take on survivors, along with other destroyers which lowered boats to rescue the Italians in the water. According to one British source, three hours fifteen minutes elapsed before the last two men from the submarine were taken off and the boat was sunk with depth charges. According to Italian sources, Liuzzi was scuttled by its crew; ten men were killed in the engagement, including the commander, tenente Lorenzo Bezzi, who went down with the submarine.

== Battle ==
Approximate position of the Battle of the Espero convoy

On 28 June, the Italian destroyers were spotted at 12:10 p.m. by a 228 Squadron Sunderland (L.5806) from Malta, about 50 nmi (93 km; 58 mi) west of Zakynthos in the Ionian Sea, to the west of Greece and about 150 nmi (280 km; 170 mi) from Position K. No course was given by the Sunderland crew and the Italian ships were thought to be heading for Kythira; at 4:10 p.m. the 7th Cruiser squadron turned north to intercept the Italian ships. At 4:40 p.m. a sighting by Sunderland (L.5803) had them still heading south, about 35 nmi (65 km; 40 mi) from Orion. Tovey ordered a turn to the south-west and an increase in speed to 25 kn (29 mph; 46 km/h). The cruisers sailed on a course of 180°, the 1st Cruiser Division, Orion, Neptune and Sydney to overhaul the Italians to starboard and the 2nd Cruiser Division, Liverpool and Gloucester, about 5 nmi (9.3 km; 5.8 mi) apart from them, to overtake them to port.

The Italian destroyers were steaming south-east at high speed when they were spotted by Liverpool at 6:30 p.m., about 100 nmi (190 km; 120 mi) north of Tobruk; the cruiser commenced firing three minutes later at 18,000 yd (8.9 nmi). The Italian ships had the notional speed to outrun the cruisers but their age, heavy loads and the sea state meant that the British ships slowly caught up. The Italians had been taken by surprise and could not launch torpedoes because of their deck cargoes but they were difficult to hit as they made smoke, darkness gathered and the ships sailed towards the afterglow of the sun. At 7:05 p.m. Neptune reported torpedoes and the British ships changed course to comb the spread. The 2nd Cruiser Division concentrated on Espero and by 7:20 p.m. had closed the range to 14,000 yd (6.9 nmi; 8.0 mi; 13 km) and the 1st Division turned 50° to starboard to bring all their turrets to bear ("opening 'A' arcs") and Espero hit Liverpool on her side plating just 3 feet (0.91 m) above the waterline; Liverpool also suffered blast damage from her guns. Espero was not hit until the fifteenth salvo. Baroni realised that his overloaded ships were doomed and decided to sacrifice Espero to enable the other two to escape, laid smoke and manoeuvred evasively as Zeffiro and Ostro raced south-west. At 8:00 p.m. Espero was hit and brought to a stop.

Sketch of the Battle

As night was falling and short of ammunition, Tovey abandoned the chase ten minutes later and changed course for Malta. Tovey ordered Sydney to finish off Espero and when at 6,000 yd (3.0 nmi; 3.4 mi; 5.5 km) received two shells from Espero and replied with four salvoes, scoring hits. Espero began to burn from the bow to amidships and at 8:35 p.m., Sydney closed to 2,000 yd (1,800 m) astern of the destroyer. Men jumped from the burning ship and there was an explosion near the bridge. At 8:40 p.m., with a list of almost 90°, Espero sank at 35°18′N 20°8′E. Sydney lowered both of its boats to rescue survivors and used Jacob's ladders and Bosun's chairs to bring them aboard. The glare from Espero before it sank and the presence of Italian submarines led to the rescue effort being ended at 10:19 p.m. when all 47 survivors in sight had been collected. Sydney left behind one of the cutters with oars, sails, foodstuffs, water and rifles, illuminated with a signal projector so that remaining survivors could board it. Three of the survivors died before the ship reached Alexandria and six others were found alive on a raft by Topazio fourteen days later.

== Aftermath ==
=== Analysis ===
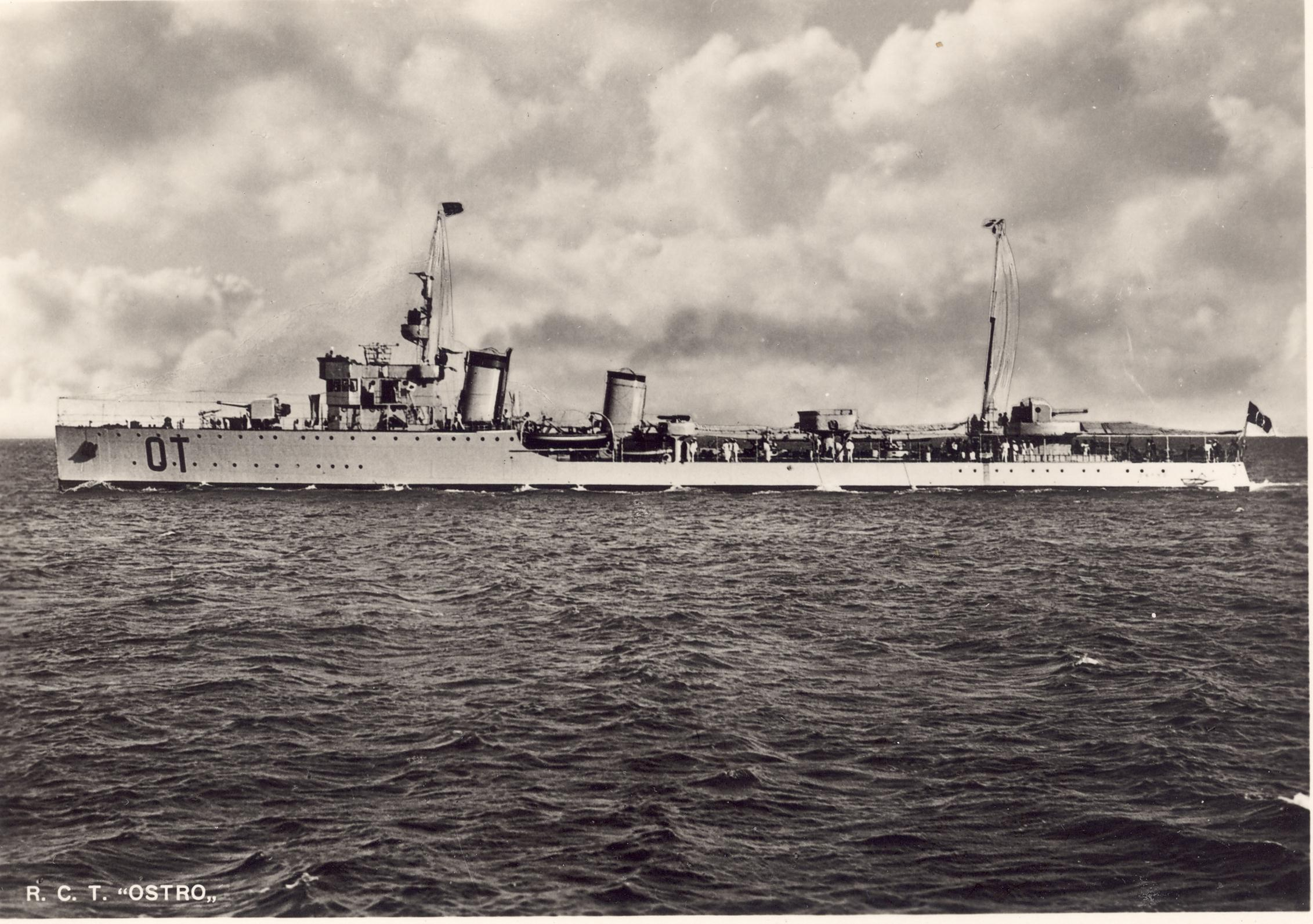
Ostro photographed outside Taranto, 1 January 1930

The engagement had lasted for about two hours and ten minutes; the 7th Cruiser Squadron fired about 5,000 shells. An Italian 4.7 in (120 mm) shell hit Liverpool 3 ft (0.91 m) above the waterline but caused little damage. Some of the prisoners on Sydney disclosed the purpose of the operation, that Espero had a company of 225 men and passengers embarked and that Baroni had been killed in the explosion near the bridge. Other survivors (including two officers), later questioned by an Italian enquiry commission about the loss of Espero, instead stated that Baroni had survived the explosion with only minor wounds but had decided to go down with his ship. The ammunition consumption of the British cruisers exacerbated a shortage of ammunition at Alexandria, where only 800 6-inch shells were in stock. The Battle of the Espero Convoy demonstrated that a daylight naval action at long range was likely to be indecisive and wasteful of ammunition.

The 2nd Cruiser Division was so short of ammunition that it returned to Alexandria and the Malta convoys were postponed. The 1st Cruiser Division reached Alexandria on 1 July, having also been ineffectually bombed. Convoy AS 1 from the Aegean was attacked from 29 June to 1 July by Italian aircraft based in the Dodecanese Islands but reached Alexandria and Port Said undamaged on 2 and 3 July. In 1998, Greene and Massignani wrote that had Italian aircraft spotted the Allied cruisers before they came within range, all three destroyers could have escaped. Baroni was posthumously awarded the Gold Medal of Military Valour (Medaglia d´oro al valor militare). The lack of ammunition and the danger of Italian submarines led to the two Malta convoy sailings being postponed for two weeks, followed by Operation MF 5, culminating in the Battle of Punta Stilo on 9 July 1940.

=== Subsequent operations ===
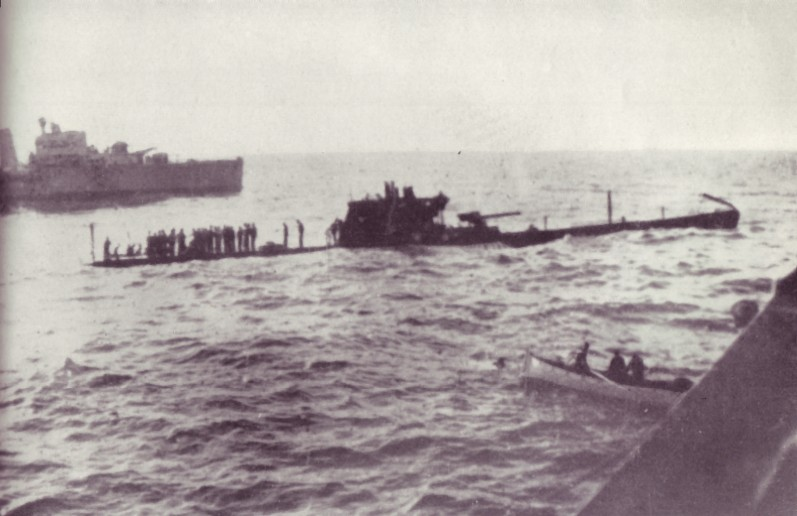
The Italian submarine Uebi Scebeli sinking near Ilex and Dainty

At dawn on 29 June, the 2nd Destroyer Flotilla caught the submarine Uebi Scebeli on the surface 160 nmi (300 km; 180 mi) west of Crete. The submarine dived and was depth charged by three of the destroyers which forced it to the surface, where survivors were rescued. Dainty sank the submarine with gunfire at 8:20 am.; the destroyers made for Alexandria, arriving at about 7:00 p.m. on 30 June. The prisoners talked of a submarine patrol line between Crete and the African coast and two destroyers were despatched from Alexandria to Derna on an anti-submarine sortie. The ships detected a submerged submarine on 1 July, attacked and claimed its sinking; when the ships returned on 2 July the claim was disallowed. Zeffiro and Ostro had reached Benghazi on 29 June and arrived at Tobruk shortly after. The smaller Pilo and Missori also reached Libya after being diverted to the port of Tripoli.

On 5 July, nine Swordfish torpedo-bombers of 813 Naval Air Squadron (NAS), Fleet Air Arm, flew from Sidi Barrani in western Egypt, to attack the ships in Tobruk harbour. The Swordfish had twelve fighter escorts from 33 Squadron and 211 Squadron strafed the airfield, damaging eight Fiat CR.42 fighters, also flying several reconnaissance sorties. The Swordfish dropped seven torpedoes in the harbour and sank the destroyer Zeffiro, the merchantmen Manzoni and Serenitas. The destroyer Euro and the liner Liguria were damaged. On the evening after the attack, 830 NAS from Malta bombed the airfield at Catania in Sicily. Capetown and Caledon of the 3rd Cruiser Squadron, with four destroyers, bombarded the port of Bardia from 9,000 yd (5.1 mi; 8.2 km) at dawn on 6 July and hit two ships, before standing by to assist the crews of any aircraft damaged on the Tobruk raid; Italian aircraft attacked the ships to no effect. The guns of Zeffiro were salvaged from the harbour and sent to Bardia to augment the coastal defences.

== Orders of battle ==
=== Royal Navy ===
7th Cruiser Squadron
Ship	Flag	Type	Notes
HMS Neptune	Royal Navy	Leander-class cruiser	1st Cruiser Division
HMS Orion	Royal Navy	Leander-class cruiser	1st Cruiser Division (Flagship, Vice-Admiral John Tovey)
HMAS Sydney	Royal Navy	Leander-class cruiser	1st Cruiser Division
HMS Gloucester	Royal Navy	Town-class cruiser	2nd Cruiser Division
HMS Liverpool	Royal Navy	Town-class cruiser	2nd Cruiser Division

=== Regia Marina ===
2nd Destroyer Squadron
Ship	Flag	Type	Notes
Espero	Kingdom of Italy	Turbine class	Flagship Capitano di Fregata Enrico Baroni (sunk)
Ostro	Kingdom of Italy	Turbine class	
Zeffiro	Kingdom of Italy	Turbine class	
