= Minotaur (disambiguation) =

The Minotaur is a mythological monster, half-man and half-bull.

Minotaur may also refer to:

== Military ==
- Minotaur (rocket family), an American rocket designed to launch small satellites
- HMS Minotaur, a historical ship name of the Royal Navy
- MI AC Disp F1 Minotaur mine, a French scatterable anti-tank mine
- Minotaur class battleship, enlarged versions of HMS Achilles with heavier armament and armour, and more powerful engines
- Minotaur class cruiser (disambiguation), two classes of cruisers of the Royal Navy
- USS Minotaur, an Achelous-class landing craft repair ship

== Art and entertainment ==
=== Film, television and theatre ===
- Minotaur (2006 film), a horror film
- Minotaur (2026 film), a political thriller drama film
- Minotaur, the Wild Beast of Crete, a 1960 Italian film
- The Minotaur (opera), a 2008 opera by Harrison Birtwistle
- "Minotaur" (Fear the Walking Dead), a television episode
- Minotaur, a Brazilian combat robot competing in BattleBots
- The Minotaur, the antagonist of a 1980 episode of Scooby-Doo and Scrappy-Doo (1979), "Lock the Door, It's a Minotaur!"
- The Minotaur, the antagonist of a 1983 episode of The New Scooby and Scrappy-Doo Show, "Scooby and the Minotaur"

=== Literature ===
- Minotaur (novel), a 1981 novel by Benjamin Tammuz
- The Minotaur, a 1989 spy thriller novel by Stephen Coonts
- The Minotaur (novel), a 2005 novel by Barbara Vine (Ruth Rendell)
- Minotaur (comics), different fictional characters appearing in comic books published by Marvel Comics
- Minotaur (New-Gen), a fictional superhero in the NEW-GEN comic books published by Marvel Comics
- "The Minotaur", a chapter in the Tanglewood Tales by Nathaniel Hawthorne
- Minotaur Books, an imprint of St. Martin's Press publishing company

=== Music ===
- Minotaur (Pixies album), 2009
- Minotaur (The Clientele album), 2010
- "Minotaur", a song by Clutch from Strange Cousins from the West, 2009
- "Minotaur", a song by Photek from Modus Operandi, 1997
- "The Minotaur", a Moog instrumental by Dick Hyman, 1969

=== Other art and entertainment ===
- Minotaur: The Labyrinths of Crete, a 1992 computer game
- The Minotaur (painting), an 1885 painting by George Frederic Watts

== People ==
- "The Minotaur", the ringname of professional wrestler Steve DiSalvo (born 1949) during his run in World Championship Wrestling
- "Minotauro", the ringname of Brazilian mixed martial artist Antônio Rodrigo Nogueira (born 1976)

== Other uses ==
- Minotaur, the early development name of the application which became Mozilla Thunderbird
- Minotaure, a French surrealist magazine
- Minotaur beetle (Typhaeus typhoeus)
- Minotaur, a boss from the 2020 video game Ultrakill
