= Italian destroyer Espero (1927) =

Destroyer of the Regia Marina

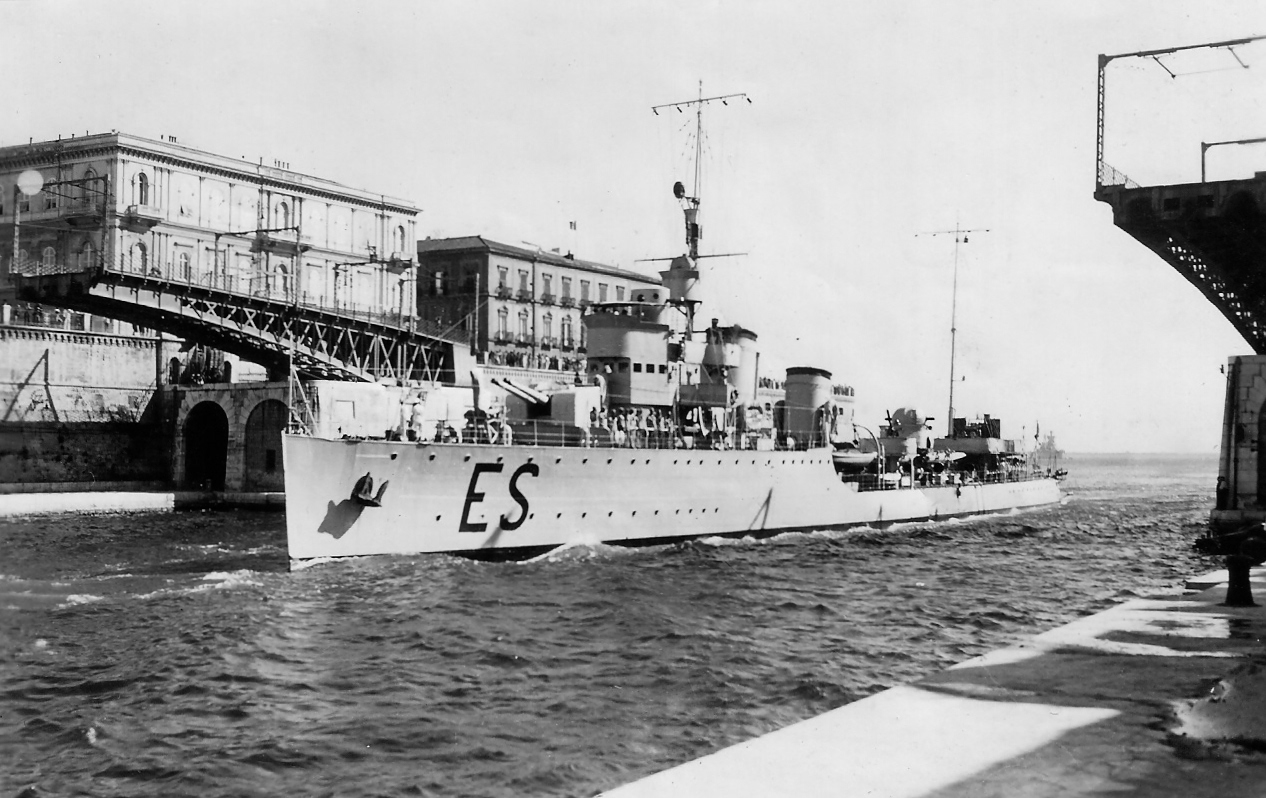
- Espero, passing through Taranto

History

Kingdom of Italy
- Name: Espero
- Namesake: Westerly wind
- Builder: Ansaldo, Genoa-Sestri Ponente
- Laid down: 29 April 1925
- Launched: 31 August 1927
- Commissioned: 30 April 1928
- Identification: ES
- Fate: Sunk by gunfire, 28 June 1940

General characteristics (as built)
- Class & type: Turbine-class destroyer
- Displacement: 1,090 t (1,070 long tons) (standard); 1,700 t (1,670 long tons) (full load)
- Length: 93.2 m (305 ft 9 in)
- Beam: 9.2 m (30 ft 2 in)
- Draught: 3 m (9 ft 10 in)
- Installed power: 3 Thornycroft boilers; 40,000 shp (30,000 kW)
- Propulsion: 2 shafts; 2 geared steam turbines
- Speed: 33 knots (61 km/h; 38 mph)
- Range: 3,200 nmi (5,900 km; 3,700 mi) at 14 knots (26 km/h; 16 mph)
- Complement: 179
- Armament: 2 × twin 120 mm (4.7 in) guns; 2 × single 40 mm (1.6 in) AA guns; 1 × twin 13.2 mm (0.52 in) machine guns; 2 × triple 533 mm (21 in) torpedo tubes; 52 mines

Italian destroyer Espero was one of eight Turbine-class destroyers built for the Regia Marina (Royal Italian Navy) during the 1920s. She was named after a westerly wind, Espero, or Ponente, common in summer in the Mediterranean. Completed in 1928, Espero was sent to Shanghai after the Shanghai Incident on 28 January 1932. After encountering heavy seas, she had to stop at Saigon, French Indochina, then stayed in the Far East even after a truce had been negotiated between China and Japan.

After Italy entered World War II on 10 June 1940, Espero was part of the 2nd Destroyer Squadron, based at Taranto. Only seventeen days after Italy's entry into the war, Espero was sunk during the Battle of the Espero Convoy as she covered the convoy's retreat, the first surface engagement between Allied and Italian warships. The ship was the first Italian destroyer to be lost in World War II.

== Design and description ==
The Turbine-class destroyers were enlarged and improved versions of the preceding Sauro class. They had an overall length of 93.2 meters (306 ft), a beam of 9.2 meters (30 ft 2 in) and a mean draft of 3 meters (9 ft 10 in). They displaced 1,090 metric tons (1,070 long tons) at standard load, and 1,700 metric tons (1,670 long tons) at deep load. Their complement was 12 officers and 167 enlisted men.

The Turbines were powered by two Parsons geared steam turbines, each driving one propeller shaft using steam supplied by three Thornycroft boilers. The turbines were rated at 40,000 shaft horsepower (30,000 kW) for a speed of 33 knots (61 km/h; 38 mph) in service, although Espero reached a speed of 38.4 knots (71.1 km/h; 44.2 mph) during her sea trials while lightly loaded. They carried enough fuel oil to give them a range of 3,200 nautical miles (5,900 km; 3,700 mi) at a speed of 14 knots (26 km/h; 16 mph).

Their main battery consisted of four 120-millimeter (4.7 in) guns in two twin-gun turrets, one each fore and aft of the superstructure. Anti-aircraft (AA) defense for the Turbine-class ships was provided by a pair of 40-millimeter (1.6 in) AA guns in single mounts amidships and a twin-gun mount for 13.2-millimeter (0.52 in) machine guns. They were equipped with six 533-millimeter (21 in) torpedo tubes in two triple mounts amidships. The Turbines could carry 52 mines.

== Construction and career ==
Espero at anchor

Espero was laid down by Gio. Ansaldo & C. at their Genoa-Sestri Ponente shipyard on 29 April 1925, launched on 31 August 1927 and commissioned on 30 April 1928. Together with Ostro, Zeffiro and Borea, after completion Espero was assigned to the 1st Squadron of the I Destroyer Flotilla, based in La Spezia.

After the Shanghai Incident of January 1932 which led to hostilities between China and Japan, Italy decided to send two warships and the San Marco Battalion to protect their colony in Shanghai. Trento and Espero were selected for the mission. Both vessels departed from Gaeta on 5 February 1932 under command of Admiral Domenico Cavagnari. Trento reached Shanghai on 4 March, while Espero, slowed down by rough weather, had to stop at Saigon before reaching China three days later. After a truce was negotiated between Japan and China, Trento left Shanghai on 14 May 1932 for the return journey to Italy, while Espero stayed behind for a year to complement and strengthen Italian naval squadron in the Far East. In 1934 Espero, along with Ostro, Zeffiro and Borea formed the 4th Destroyer Squadron, part of the 2nd Naval Division.

=== World War II ===
At the time of Italy's entrance into World War II on 10 June 1940, Espero together with sister ships Zeffiro, Ostro and Borea formed 2nd Destroyer Squadron based at Taranto.

==== Battle of the Espero Convoy ====
On 27 June 1940 Espero, commanded by Captain Enrico Baroni, sailed from Taranto at 22:45 for the first war mission, along with Ostro and Zeffiro. The three vessels were to transport to Tobruk two light anti-aircraft batteries, 120 short tons (110 t) of ammunition (450,000 rounds) and 162 members of the Voluntary Militia for National Security.

On 28 June 1940 at 12:10, about 50 mi (43 nmi; 80 km) west of Zakynthos, the convoy was sighted by a British reconnaissance Short Sunderland plane. As they were within striking range of the British 7th Cruiser Squadron, composed of light cruisers Liverpool, Orion, Neptune, Gloucester and Sydney, Admiral John Tovey ordered them to intercept the Italians. The Italian column was sighted by the Allied ships around 18:30, about 100 miles north of Tobruk, and at 18:36 Liverpool opened fire from 22,000 yd (20,000 m) at the surprised Italian flotilla. At 18:59 Orion also opened fire from 18,000 yd (16,000 m). The Italian destroyers were theoretically faster than the British cruisers, but due to their age and heavy cargo on board their speed advantage was nullified. In addition, Espero's third boiler turned out to be defective, limiting the destroyer's speed to just 25 knots (46 km/h; 29 mph). Captain Baroni, therefore, decided to sacrifice his ship in order to cover the escape of Zeffiro and Ostro, and ordered them to disengage and sail for Benghazi at full speed. Espero laid smokescreens and conducted evasive maneuvers, engaging Liverpool's division with guns, and simultaneously firing three torpedoes at Orion.

While Liverpool and Gloucester took on Espero, the other three cruisers tried to get around the smokescreens to attack the fleeing Ostro and Zeffiro, but were ordered to abandon their pursuit and concentrate on Espero instead. Due to zigzagging Espero managed to avoid being hit, but by 19:20 the range between her and Liverpool had shortened to 14,000 yd (13,000 m). In fact, Italians drew first blood, when an Italian 4.7 in (120 mm) shell hit Liverpool just 3 ft above the waterline, with splinters penetrating the warheads of two torpedoes, but caused little damage otherwise. Despite heavy firing, Espero was not hit until 20:00, when her engine rooms were struck bringing the vessel to a stop. The 7th Squadron expended about 5,000 shells, more than 1,600 of main caliber, before the Italian destroyer was sunk, after 130 minutes of fierce fighting. Sydney rescued 47 out of 225 men from the Italian destroyer, and thirty six more escaped on rafts, but only six of them were later found alive by Italian submarine Topazio almost 20 days later. Captain Baroni died aboard his ship, and was posthumously awarded the Medaglia d´oro al valor militare.

== Bibliography ==
- Brescia, Maurizio (2012). Mussolini's Navy: A Reference Guide to the Regina Marina 1930–45. Annapolis, Maryland: Naval Institute Press. ISBN 978-1-59114-544-8.
- Fraccaroli, Aldo (1968). Italian Warships of World War II. Shepperton, UK: Ian Allan. ISBN 0-7110-0002-6.
- Greene, Jack & Massignani, Alessandro (1998). The Naval War in the Mediterranean, 1940–1943. London: Chatham Publishing. ISBN 1-86176-057-4.
- Gustavsson, Hakan (2010). Desert Prelude 1940-41: Early Clashes. Casemate Publishers. ISBN 978-8389450524.
- McMurtrie, Francis E., ed. (1937). Jane's Fighting Ships 1937. London: Sampson Low. OCLC 927896922.
- O'Hara, Vincent P. (2009). Struggle for the Middle Sea: The Great Navies at War in the Mediterranean Theater, 1940–1945. Annapolis, Maryland: Naval Institute Press. ISBN 978-1-59114-648-3.
- Roberts, John (1980). "Italy". In Chesneau, Roger (ed.). Conway's All the World's Fighting Ships 1922–1946. New York: Mayflower Books. pp. 280–317. ISBN 0-8317-0303-2.
- Rohwer, Jürgen (2005). Chronology of the War at Sea 1939–1945: The Naval History of World War Two (Third Revised ed.). Annapolis, Maryland: Naval Institute Press. ISBN 1-59114-119-2.
- Whitley, M. J. (1988). Destroyers of World War 2: An International Encyclopedia. Annapolis, Maryland: Naval Institute Press. ISBN 1-85409-521-8.
