= The Blood Doctor =

2002 novel by Barbara Vine

- First edition (UK)
- Author: Barbara Vine (Ruth Rendell)
- Language: English
- Genre: Crime/Mystery novel
- Publisher: Viking (UK); Crown (US)
- Publication date: 6 June 2002
- Publication place: United Kingdom
- Media type: Print/Audiobook
- Pages: 400 pp (Hardback)
- ISBN: 0-670-91274-3
- OCLC: 59395413
- Preceded by: Grasshopper
- Followed by: The Minotaur

The Blood Doctor is a novel by British writer Ruth Rendell, written under the pseudonym Barbara Vine.

== Plot ==
Told from the point of view of Martin Nanther, a biographer, this novel follows the main character's investigation into his own great-grandfather, a blood-doctor for the royal family under Queen Victoria. In the course of his investigation, Martin discovers his subject may not have been the upstanding peer he thought he was.
