= Enrico Baroni =

Italian naval officer

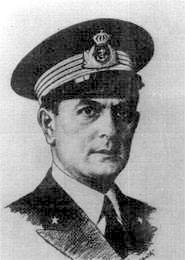
- Born: 24 November 1892; Florence, Tuscany, Italy
- Died: 28 June 1940 (aged 47); Mediterranean Sea, off Crete, Greek Islands
- Military career
- Allegiance: Kingdom of Italy
- Branch: Regia Marina
- Service years: 1911–1940
- Rank: Capitano di Vascello (Captain)
- Commands: Cortellazzo (torpedo boat); Aquilone (destroyer); Superior Command Far East; Cagliari Naval Command; Luigi Cadorna (light cruiser); Espero (destroyer); 2nd Destroyer Squadron
- Conflicts: World War I; World War II; Mediterranean War; Battle of the Espero Convoy †
- Awards: Gold Medal of Military Valor (posthumous)

Enrico Baroni (24 November 1892 – 28 June 1940) was an Italian naval officer during World War II.

== Biography ==
Born in Florence in 1892, Enrico Baroni enrolled in the Italian Naval Academy in Livorno on 10 November 1911, and graduated in 1914 with the rank of ensign. During World War I he served first on the battleships Roma and Conte di Cavour, then on the armored cruiser Pisa and finally, as the first fire control officer, on the battleship Dante Alighieri. At the end of the war, he was assigned to the Technical Office of Naval Weapons in Venice and stationed on the repair ship Quarnaro.

He was then given command of the torpedo boat Cortellazzo and, after promotion to lieutenant commander, of the destroyer Aquilone. In 1932, he was promoted to commander and appointed executive officer of the heavy cruiser Fiume, and afterwards he held the post of Superior Commander in the Far East, with insignia on the minelayer Lepanto. After repatriation, he was promoted to captain and appointed commander of the Cagliari Naval Command for a period, before being given command of the light cruiser Luigi Cadorna.

In 1940, he was given command of 2nd Destroyer Squadron, with flag on Espero. On 27 June 1940, the Espero, along with sisterships Ostro and Zeffiro, sailed from Taranto for Tobruk in a fast transport mission of some batteries of anti-tank guns; on the following day, however, the three destroyers, sighted by British reconnaissance planes, were intercepted by five British light cruisers under Vice Admiral John Tovey. Baroni decided to hold back the British cruisers with his ship for as long as possible, so as to give Ostro and Zeffiro the time needed to escape; Espero's sacrifice in fact allowed the two sister ships to escape and reach Benghazi and then Tobruk. Espero, after a solitary two-hour battle against Tovey's ships, was finally hit by the cruiser's fire, left dead in the water, and finished off by HMAS Sydney. After giving orders for the scuttling and the abandonment of the ship, Baroni returned to the bridge and went down with his ship. He was posthumously awarded the Gold Medal of Military Valor.
