= Italian destroyer Ostro (1928) =

Destroyer of the Regia Marina

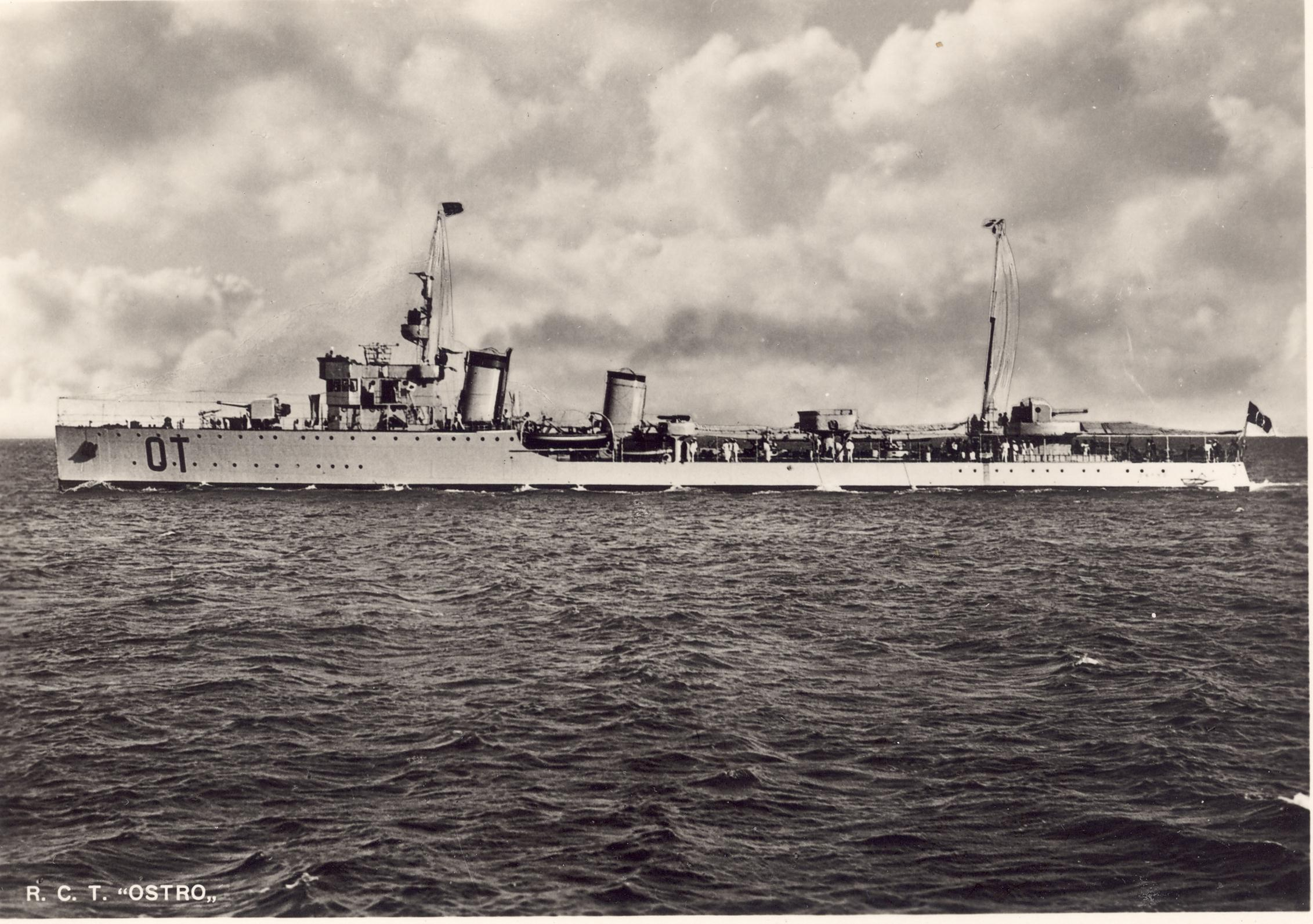
- Ostro outside Taranto

History

Kingdom of Italy
- Name: Ostro
- Namesake: Ostro, southerly wind
- Builder: Ansaldo, Genoa
- Laid down: 29 April 1925
- Launched: 2 January 1928
- Sponsored by: Miss Batina Negrotto
- Completed: 9 June 1928
- Commissioned: 9 October 1928
- Identification: OT
- Motto: Allo sbaraglio
- Fate: Sunk, 20 July 1940

General characteristics (as built)
- Class & type: Turbine-class destroyer
- Displacement: 1,090 t (1,070 long tons) (standard); 1,700 t (1,670 long tons) (full load)
- Length: 93.2 m (305 ft 9 in)
- Beam: 9.2 m (30 ft 2 in)
- Draught: 3 m (9 ft 10 in)
- Installed power: 3 Thornycroft boilers; 40,000 shp (30,000 kW)
- Propulsion: 2 shafts; 2 geared steam turbines
- Speed: 33 knots (61 km/h; 38 mph)
- Range: 3,200 nmi (5,900 km; 3,700 mi) at 14 knots (26 km/h; 16 mph)
- Complement: 179
- Armament: 2 × twin 120 mm (4.7 in) guns; 2 × single 40 mm (1.6 in) AA guns; 1 × twin 13.2 mm (0.52 in) machine guns; 2 × triple 533 mm (21 in) torpedo tubes; 52 mines

Ostro was one of eight Turbine-class destroyers built for the Regia Marina (Royal Italian Navy) during the 1920s. She was named after a southerly wind, Ostro, common in the Mediterranean and Adriatic. The ship played a minor role in the Spanish Civil War of 1936–1937, supporting the Nationalists.

== Design and description ==
The Turbine-class destroyers were enlarged and improved versions of the preceding Sauro class. They had an overall length of 93.2 meters (306 ft), a beam of 9.2 meters (30 ft 2 in) and a mean draft of 3 meters (9 ft 10 in). They displaced 1,090 metric tons (1,070 long tons) at standard load, and 1,700 metric tons (1,670 long tons) at deep load. Their complement was 12 officers and 167 enlisted men.

The Turbines were powered by two Parsons geared steam turbines, each driving one propeller shaft using steam supplied by three Thornycroft boilers. The turbines were rated at 40,000 shaft horsepower (30,000 kW) for a speed of 33 knots (61 km/h; 38 mph) in service, although her sister ships reached speeds in excess of 36 knots (67 km/h; 41 mph) during their sea trials while lightly loaded. They carried enough fuel oil to give them a range of 3,200 nautical miles (5,900 km; 3,700 mi) at a speed of 14 knots (26 km/h; 16 mph).

Their main battery consisted of four 120-millimeter (4.7 in) guns in two twin-gun turrets, one each fore and aft of the superstructure. Anti-aircraft (AA) defense for the Turbine-class ships was provided by a pair of 40-millimeter (1.6 in) AA guns in single mounts amidships and a twin-gun mount for 13.2-millimeter (0.52 in) machine guns. They were equipped with six 533-millimeter (21 in) torpedo tubes in two triple mounts amidships. The Turbines could carry 52 mines.

== Construction and career ==
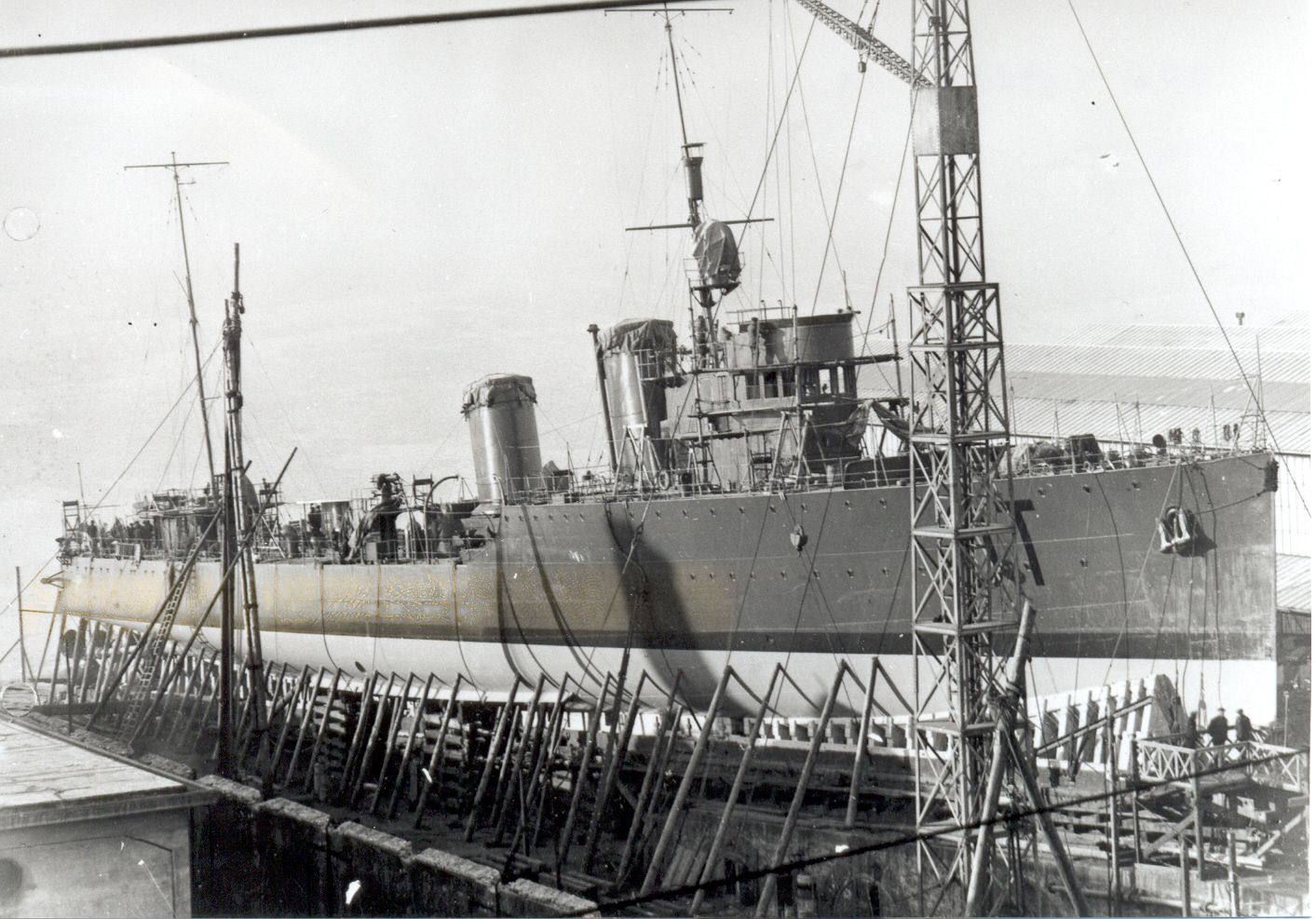
Ostro being launched in Genoa in 1928

Ostro was laid down by Gio. Ansaldo & C. at their Genoa shipyard on 29 April 1925, launched on 2 January 1928 and completed on 9 October. Upon her completion, Ostro, together with other vessels of her class conducted exercises in the Tyrrhenian Sea and visited Monaco to attend the celebrations of the local Italian community. Together with Espero, Zeffiro and Borea the ship was assigned to the 1st Squadron of the I Destroyer Flotilla based at La Spezia. In 1929 she carried out a training cruise of the coast of Spain, and in 1930 another one in the Dodecanese and Aegean Sea. In 1931 Ostro together with Turbine, Aquilone and Borea as well as older Daniele Manin, Giovanni Nicotera and Pantera formed 1st Destroyer Flotilla, part of II Naval Division. In 1934 after another reorganization Ostro as well as Espero, Zeffiro and Borea were again reunited, now forming the 4th Destroyer Squadron, part of II Naval Division.

=== Spanish Civil War ===
After the Civil War started in Spain in July 1936, both Italy and Nazi Germany supported the Nationalists of General Franco, whereas Soviet Union was actively supporting the Republicans. During the first year of the war, the Soviets used the Republican controlled ports of Bilbao and Santander in the North of Spain adjacent to the French border, but after their fall in the summer of 1937, the USSR was forced to use ports in the Mediterranean to continue supplying the Republicans. Both Italy and Germany deployed their submarines in the Mediterranean in early 1937 to interdict with Republican shipping, but without much success. On 3 August 1937 Franco made an urgent plea with Mussolini to use the Italian fleet to prevent the passage of a large Soviet transport convoy, which just departed from Odessa. Originally, only submarines were supposed to be used, but Mussolini was convinced by Franco to use Italian surface ships too against the Soviets. The Italian blockade was put into effect immediately, with two cruisers, Armando Diaz and Luigi Cadorna, eight torpedo boats and eight destroyers, including Ostro being deployed in and around the Strait of Sicily and Strait of Messina.

In the evening of 13 August 1937 Ostro, under command of captain Teodorico Capone, while patrolling off Bizerte, just north of the island of Linosa, spotted and attacked Spanish Republican steamer Conde de Abásolo sailing from Cartagena to Odessa in ballast. At 20:43 the Spanish ship was struck by a torpedo and sank in the position 36°13′N 12°52′E, off Pantelleria. Twenty-three members of the ship's crew were picked up by the British steamer City of Wellington, and landed in Algiers on 17 August.

On 30 August 1937 Turbine, under command of captain Virgilio Rusca, was on patrol together with Ostro, when they encountered Soviet steamer Timiryazev around 16:00. The destroyers continued shadowing the ship until the darkness fell, and around 21:00 Turbine launched two torpedoes at the Soviet vessel, and Ostro launched one. The cargo ship was hit by two torpedoes in quick succession and rapidly sank in the position 36°57′N 03°58′E, approximately 74 miles east of Algiers. Two lifeboats with all 29 survivors were towed to Dellys by local fishing boats, and successfully reached the shore at 01:00 on 31 August. The Soviet steamer was not a blockade runner, and was transporting 2,834 tons of coal from Cardiff to Port Said.

On 3 September Ostro escorted the Republican freighter Mar Negro, which had been captured nationalist members of her crew, from Cagliari to Cape Spartivento where the ship was transferred into the custody of the Nationalist armed merchant cruiser Jaime I who took the freighter to Palma de Mallorca. The merchant was later converted into an auxiliary cruiser on Franco's navy service.

In September 1937 the Nyon Conference was called by France and Great Britain to address the "underwater piracy" conducted against merchant traffic in the Mediterranean. On 14 September an agreement was signed establishing British and French patrol zones around Spain (with a total of 60 destroyers and airforce employed) to counteract aggressive behavior by submarines. Italy was not directly accused, but had to comply with the agreement and suspend the maritime operations.

=== World War II ===
At the time of Italy entrance into World War II on 10 June 1940, Ostro together with sister ships Espero, Zeffiro and Borea formed 2nd Destroyer Squadron based at Taranto.

On 27 June 1940 Ostro sailed from Taranto at 22:45 for the first war mission, along with Zeffiro and the squadron leader Espero (commanded by Captain Enrico Baroni). The three vessels were to transport to Tobruk two anti-aircraft batteries (10 Breda Model 35 cannons in all), 120 short tons (110 t) of ammunition (450,000 rounds) and 162 members of the Voluntary Militia for Territorial Security.

On 28 June 1940 at 12:10, about 50 mi (43 nmi; 80 km) west of Zakynthos, the convoy was sighted by a British reconnaissance Short Sunderland plane. As they were within striking range of the British 7th Cruiser Squadron, composed of light cruisers Liverpool, Orion, Neptune, Gloucester and Sydney, Admiral John Tovey ordered them to intercept the Italians. The Italian column was sighted by the Allied ships around 18:30, about 100 miles north of Tobruk, and at 18:36 Liverpool opened fire from 22,000 yd (20,000 m) at the surprised Italian flotilla. At 18:59 Orion also opened fire from 18,000 yd (16,000 m). The Italian destroyers were theoretically faster than the British cruisers, but due to their age and heavy cargo on board their speed advantage was nullified. In addition, Espero's third boiler turned out to be defective, limiting the destroyer's speed to just 25 knots (46 km/h; 29 mph). Captain Baroni, therefore, decided to sacrifice his Espero in order to cover the escape of Ostro and Zeffiro, and ordered them to disengage and sail for Benghazi at full speed. Espero laid smokescreens and conducted evasive maneuvers, engaging Liverpool's division with guns, and simultaneously firing three torpedoes at Orion. While Liverpool and Gloucester took on Espero, the other three cruisers tried to get around the smokescreens to attack the fleeing Ostro and Zeffiro, but were ordered to abandon their pursuit and concentrate on Espero instead. Due to zigzagging Espero managed to avoid being hit, but by 19:20 the range between her and Liverpool had shortened to 14,000 yd (13,000 m). In fact, Italians drew first blood, when a single Italian 4.7 in (120 mm) shell hit Liverpool just 3 ft above the waterline, with splinters penetrating the warheads of two torpedoes, but caused little damage otherwise. Despite heavy firing, Espero was not hit until 20:00, when her engine rooms were struck bringing the vessel to a stop. The 7th Squadron expended about 5,000 shells, more than 1,600 of main caliber, before the Italian destroyer was sunk, after 130 minutes of fierce fighting. Sydney rescued 47 out of 225 men from the Italian destroyer, and thirty six more escaped on rafts, but only six of them were later found alive by Italian submarine Topazio almost 20 days later. Captain Baroni died aboard his ship, and was posthumously awarded the Medaglia d´oro al valor militare.

In the morning of 29 June 1940 Ostro and Zeffiro arrived in Benghazi before proceeding to Tobruk where they arrived on 1 July.

Another Italian convoy sailed to Tobruk on 30 June 1940 from Augusta carrying troops, supplies, ammunition and fuel. The convoy consisted of six cargo and passenger ships and was escorted by 6 destroyers and 4 torpedo boats. The Royal Navy failed to intercept this convoy, in large part due to the large ammunition expenditure in their previous confrontation. On 5 July 1940 there were seven Turbine-class destroyers berthed in Tobruk harbor together with four torpedo boats, six freighters and several auxiliary vessels. Between 10:00 to 11:15 a Short Sunderland reconnaissance plane overflew the harbor at an altitude of 1,500-2,000 meters and despite the anti-aircraft fire opened against it, confirmed the presence of numerous ships in the harbor. In the late afternoon a group of nine Fairey Swordfish torpedo bombers of 813 Naval Air Squadron took off from the airfield in Sidi Barrani and headed towards Tobruk. The air alarm was sounded at 20:06 but the Italians failed to detect the Allied aircraft until they were already over the harbor at 20:20. Destroyers had most of their personnel on board steamers Liguria and Sabbia with exception of dedicated air defense crews. The attack commenced a few minutes later, and lasted only seven minutes and resulted in five Italian ships being sunk or damaged. Not encountering any aerial opposition, British torpedo bombers attacked from low altitude (around 100 feet), and released their torpedoes from 400–500 meters away, almost point-blank. Zeffiro was attacked first by a plane piloted by Nicholas Kennedy, whose torpedo hit the destroyer in the bow, around the ammunition depot, between the bridge and a 120 mm cannon. The explosion broke the ship into two and sank it half an hour later. Freighter Manzoni was also hit, capsized and sank, while Euro and steamer Serenitas were hit, and had to be beached, and the ocean liner Liguria was hit and damaged. Two planes also attacked other destroyers, but failed to launch their torpedoes due to intense anti-aircraft fire. The air alarm was canceled at 21:31, and by that time all nine British planes were far away.

==== Sinking ====
On 19 July 1940 British command, believing that the light cruiser Giovanni delle Bande Nere, damaged during the Battle of Cape Spada, had taken refuge in Tobruk, decided to launch a new bomber attack against the base. Ostro along with Nembo and Aquilone were berthed at the same location as during the 5 July raid. Most personnel was on board steamers Liguria and Sabbia with exception of dedicated air defense crews. Around 17:00 twelve Bristol Blenheim bombers from 55 Squadron and 211 Squadron RAF bombed the northern part of the harbor, slightly damaging an anti-aircraft battery and the port's facilities, and losing one aircraft. At 18:56 a seaplane from the 700 Naval Air Squadron launched by the British battleship Warspite appeared to investigate results of the bombing. The seaplane was immediately targeted by anti-aircraft batteries, and shot down. At 21:54 Tobruk was put on alert again after receiving reports from the Bardia and Sidi Belafarid advanced listening stations. Around 22:30 6 Fairey Swordfish torpedo bombers from the 824 Naval Air Squadron FAA appeared in the skies above Tobruk harbor and were met with strong anti-aircraft fire. This forced the planes to make several passes over the area trying to avoid the fire, and also to acquire the targets, the situation exacerbated by a fairly cloudy night. The British finally managed to sort out their objectives by about 01:30 on 20 July and assumed attack formation at low altitude. At 01:32 steamer Sereno was struck in the stern by a torpedo, launched from a plane, piloted by squadron commander F.S. Quarry, causing her to slowly sink. At 01:34 Ostro was hit in her stern ammunition depot by a torpedo launched from a plane piloted by S. F. Fullmore, causing the ship to go ablaze and sink ten minutes later. Nembo was hit by a torpedo at 01:37 and sank. The British lost one plane in the attack which crash-landed on the way back in the Italian controlled territory.

Ostro's crew suffered 42 casualties, with 2 officers and 40 NCOs and sailors being missing or killed in the attack. 20 more people were wounded, including commander Zarpellon.

The guns from both Ostro and Nembo were later removed and used by Italians to reinforce defenses of Bardia.

Ships sunk by Ostro
Date	Ship	Flag	Tonnage	Ship Type	Cargo
13 August 1937	Conde de Abásolo	(Second Spanish Republic)	3,122 GRT	Freighter	in ballast
Total:			3,122 GRT		

== Bibliography ==
- Brescia, Maurizio (2012). Mussolini's Navy: A Reference Guide to the Regina Marina 1930–45. Annapolis, Maryland: Naval Institute Press. ISBN 978-1-59114-544-8.
- Brown, David (2013). The Royal Navy and the Mediterranean: Vol.I: September 1939 – October 1940. Routledge. ISBN 978-1-135-28154-0.
- Fraccaroli, Aldo (1968). Italian Warships of World War II. Shepperton, UK: Ian Allan. ISBN 0-7110-0002-6.
- Greene, Jack & Massignani, Alessandro (1998). The Naval War in the Mediterranean, 1940–1943. London: Chatham Publishing. ISBN 1-86176-057-4.
- Gustavsson, Hakan (2010). Desert Prelude 1940–41: Early Clashes. Casemate Publishers. ISBN 978-8389450524.
- McMurtrie, Francis E., ed. (1937). Jane's Fighting Ships 1937. London: Sampson Low. OCLC 927896922.
- O'Hara, Vincent P. (2009). Struggle for the Middle Sea: The Great Navies at War in the Mediterranean Theater, 1940–1945. Annapolis, Maryland: Naval Institute Press. ISBN 978-1-59114-648-3.
- Ramoino, Pier Paolo (September 2011). "La Regia Marina Tra le due Guerre Mondiali" (PDF). Rivista Marittima (Supplement). Archived from the original (PDF) on 29 August 2018.
- Roberts, John (1980). "Italy". In Chesneau, Roger (ed.). Conway's All the World's Fighting Ships 1922–1946. New York: Mayflower Books. pp. 280–317. ISBN 0-8317-0303-2.
- Rohwer, Jürgen (2005). Chronology of the War at Sea 1939–1945: The Naval History of World War Two (Third Revised ed.). Annapolis, Maryland: Naval Institute Press. ISBN 1-59114-119-2.
- Whitley, M. J. (1988). Destroyers of World War 2: An International Encyclopedia. Annapolis, Maryland: Naval Institute Press. ISBN 1-85409-521-8.
