= Grasshopper (novel) =

2000 novel by Barbara Vine

- First edition (UK)
- Author: Barbara Vine (Ruth Rendell)
- Language: English
- Genre: Crime/Mystery novel
- Publisher: Viking (UK); Harmony (US)
- Publication date: 1 June 2000
- Publication place: United Kingdom
- Media type: Print/Audiobook
- Pages: 416 (hardback)
- ISBN: 0-670-89174-6
- OCLC: 43718879
- Preceded by: The Chimney Sweeper's Boy
- Followed by: The Blood Doctor

Grasshopper is a novel by Barbara Vine, pseudonym of author Ruth Rendell, first published in 2000.

== Reception ==
The Guardian stated that "Vine's great talent is in making sure that we care" but that "When it comes to the animate, however, Vine's touch is sometimes less sure." Entertainment Weekly rated it an A−, writing that "As do all Barbara Vine novels, the well-wrought mystery Grasshopper has a lot lurking below its carefully composed surface".
