= The Chimney Sweeper's Boy =

1998 novel by Barbara Vine

- Author: Barbara Vine (Ruth Rendell)
- Language: English
- Genre: Crime / Mystery novel
- Publisher: Viking (UK); Harmony (US)
- Publication date: 26 March 1998
- Publication place: United Kingdom
- Media type: Print/Audiobook
- Pages: 352 (hardback)
- ISBN: 0-670-87927-4
- OCLC: 40980304
- Dewey Decimal: 823/.914 21
- LC Class: PR6068.E63 C47 1998c
- Preceded by: The Brimstone Wedding
- Followed by: Grasshopper

The Chimney Sweeper's Boy (1998) is a crime/mystery novel by Barbara Vine, pseudonym of British author Ruth Rendell.

== Plot summary ==
When successful author Gerald Candless dies of a sudden heart attack, his eldest daughter Sarah is approached by her father's publisher with a view to writing a biography about his life. Sarah embarks on the memoir but soon discovers that her perfect father was not all he appeared to be, and that in fact he wasn't Gerald Candless at all.

== Reception ==
Kirkus Reviews called the novel a "slow-moving, richly textured suspenser" and wrote that it "shows Vine at her most weblike". The Virginia Quarterly Review stated: "Reminiscent of Mary Gordon's memoir about her search for the reality of her writer father, this is a superb work of fiction."Library Journal called the audiobook an "entertaining listening experience in the low-violence mystery/suspense genre."
