= Italian destroyer Zeffiro (1927) =

Destroyer of the Regia Marina

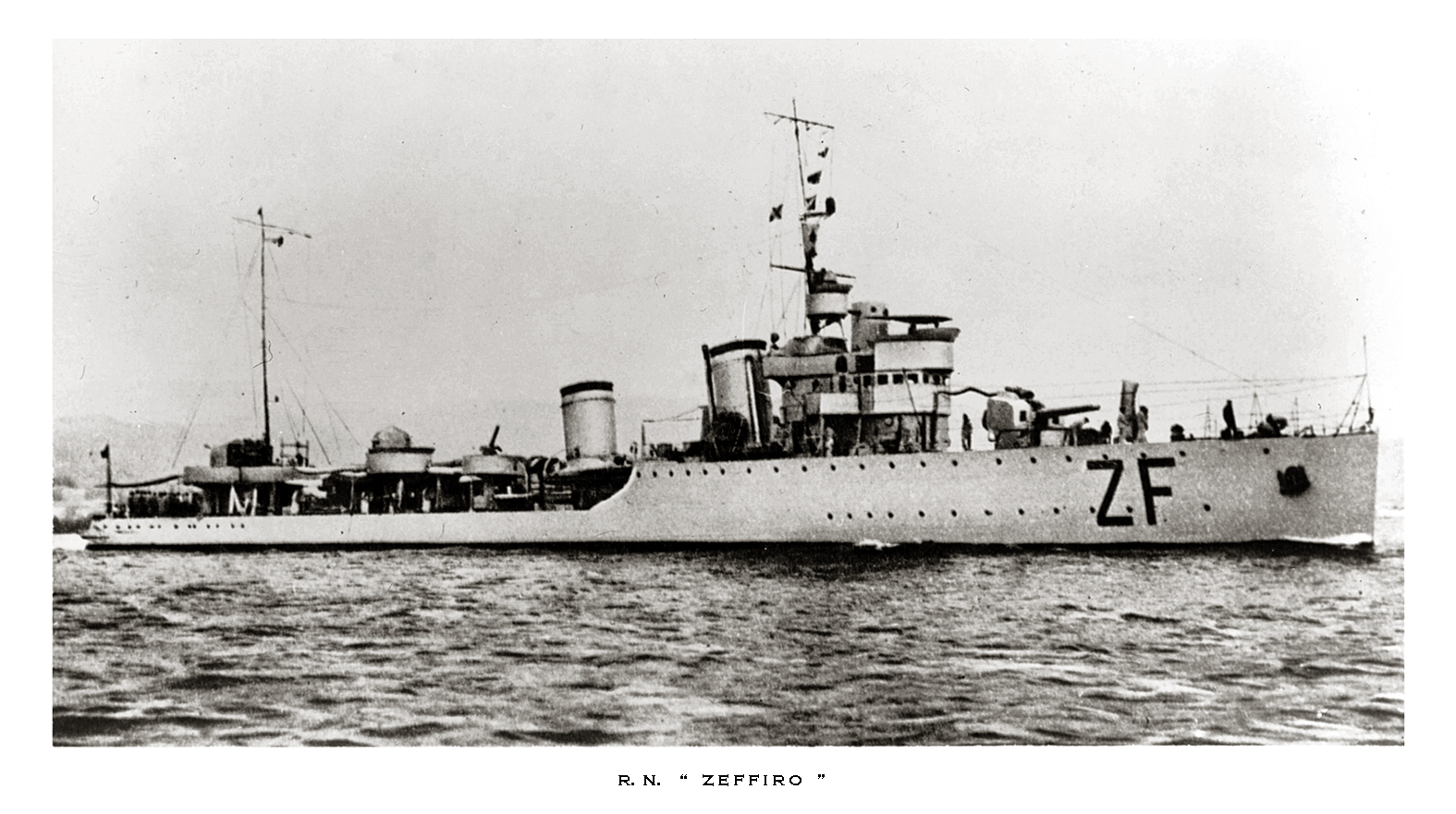
- Zeffiro in mid-1930s

History

Kingdom of Italy
- Name: Zeffiro
- Namesake: Zeffiro, westerly wind
- Builder: Ansaldo, Genoa
- Laid down: 29 April 1925
- Launched: 27 May 1927
- Sponsored by: Lena Bucci
- Completed: 15 May 1928
- Identification: ZF
- Fate: Sunk by British torpedo bombers, 5 July 1940

General characteristics (as built)
- Class & type: Turbine-class destroyer
- Displacement: 1,090 t (1,070 long tons) (standard); 1,700 t (1,670 long tons) (full load)
- Length: 93.2 m (305 ft 9 in)
- Beam: 9.2 m (30 ft 2 in)
- Draught: 3 m (9 ft 10 in)
- Installed power: 3 Thornycroft boilers; 40,000 shp (30,000 kW)
- Propulsion: 2 shafts; 2 geared steam turbines
- Speed: 33 knots (61 km/h; 38 mph)
- Range: 3,200 nmi (5,900 km; 3,700 mi) at 14 knots (26 km/h; 16 mph)
- Complement: 179
- Armament: 2 × twin 120 mm (4.7 in) guns; 2 × single 40 mm (1.6 in) AA guns; 1 × twin 13.2 mm (0.52 in) machine guns; 2 × triple 533 mm (21 in) torpedo tubes; 52 mines

Zeffiro was one of eight Turbine-class destroyer built for the Regia Marina (Royal Italian Navy) during the 1920s. She was named after a westerly wind, Zeffiro, common in summer in the Mediterranean. The ship played a minor role in the Spanish Civil War of 1936–1937, supporting the Nationalists.

== Design and description ==
The Turbine-class destroyers were enlarged and improved versions of the preceding Sauro class. They had an overall length of 93.2 meters (306 ft), a beam of 9.2 meters (30 ft 2 in) and a mean draft of 3 meters (9 ft 10 in). They displaced 1,090 metric tons (1,070 long tons) at standard load, and 1,700 metric tons (1,670 long tons) at deep load. Their complement was 12 officers and 167 enlisted men.

The Turbines were powered by two Parsons geared steam turbines, each driving one propeller shaft using steam supplied by three Thornycroft boilers. The turbines were rated at 40,000 shaft horsepower (30,000 kW) for a speed of 33 knots (61 km/h; 38 mph) in service, although Zeffiro's sister ships reached speeds over 36 knots (67 km/h; 41 mph) during their sea trials while lightly loaded. They carried enough fuel oil to give them a range of 3,200 nautical miles (5,900 km; 3,700 mi) at a speed of 14 knots (26 km/h; 16 mph).

Their main battery consisted of four 120-millimeter (4.7 in) guns in two twin-gun turrets, one each fore and aft of the superstructure. Anti-aircraft (AA) defense for the Turbine-class ships was provided by a pair of 40-millimeter (1.6 in) AA guns in single mounts amidships and a twin-gun mount for 13.2-millimeter (0.52 in) machine guns. They were equipped with six 533-millimeter (21 in) torpedo tubes in two triple mounts amidships. The Turbines could carry 52 mines.

== Construction and career ==
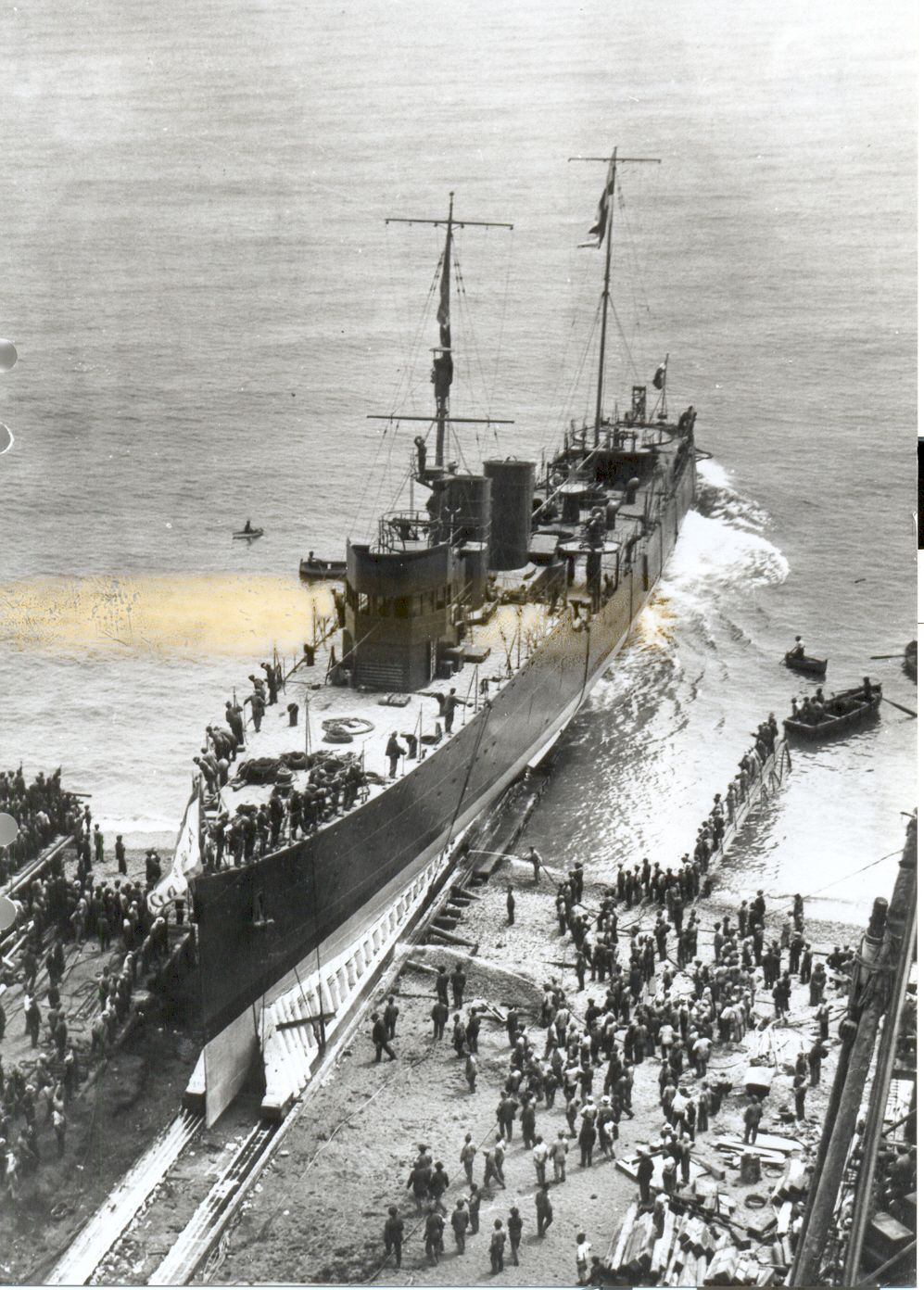
Launch of Zeffiro in Genoa-Sestri Ponente in 1927

Zeffiro was laid down by Gio. Ansaldo & C. at their Genoa-Sestri Ponente shipyard on 29 April 1925, launched on 27 May 1927 and completed on 15 May 1928. Upon her completion Zeffiro, together with Espero, Ostro and Borea, was assigned to the 1st Squadron of the I Destroyer Flotilla based at La Spezia. Between 1929 and 1932 she carried out several training cruises in the Mediterranean. In 1932 during the training exercises she was hit by a defective torpedo launched by Aquilone. In 1931 Zeffiro together with Euro, Espero and Nembo as well as old cruiser Ancona were part of II Naval Division. In 1934 after another reorganization Zeffiro as well as Espero, Ostro and Borea were again reunited, now forming the 4th Destroyer Squadron, part of II Naval Division.

=== Spanish Civil War ===
After the Civil War started in Spain in July 1936, both Italy and Nazi Germany supported the Nationalists of General Franco, whereas Soviet Union was actively supporting the Republicans. During the first year of the war, the Soviets used the Republican controlled ports of Bilbao and Santander in the North of Spain adjacent to the French border, but after their fall in the summer of 1937, the USSR was forced to use ports in the Mediterranean to continue supplying the Republicans. Both Italy and Germany deployed their submarines in the Mediterranean in early 1937 to interdict with Republican shipping, but without much success. On 3 August 1937 Franco made an urgent plea with Mussolini to use the Italian fleet to prevent the passage of a large Soviet transport convoy, which just departed from Odessa. Originally, only submarines were supposed to be used, but Mussolini was convinced by Franco to use Italian surface ships too against the Soviets. The Italian blockade was put into effect immediately, with two light cruisers, Armando Diaz and Luigi Cadorna, eight torpedo boats and eight destroyers, including Zeffiro, being deployed in and around the Strait of Sicily and Strait of Messina. Zeffiro participated in several patrols, which normally lasted three days, often paired with her sister Euro, but none of her missions were successful.

In September 1937 the Nyon Conference was called by France and Great Britain to address the "underwater piracy" conducted against merchant traffic in the Mediterranean. On 14 September an agreement was signed establishing British and French patrol zones around Spain (with a total of 60 destroyers and airforce employed) to counteract aggressive behavior by submarines. Italy was not directly accused, but had to comply with the agreement and suspend the maritime operations.

=== World War II ===
At the time of the Italian entrance into World War II on 10 June 1940, Zeffiro together with sister ships Espero, Ostro and Borea formed 2nd Destroyer Squadron based at Taranto.

On 27 June 1940 Zeffiro sailed from Taranto at 22:45 for the first war mission, along with Ostro and the squadron leader Espero (commanded by captain Enrico Baroni). The three vessels were to transport to Tobruk two anti-aircraft batteries (10 Breda Model 35 cannons in all), 120 short tons (110 t) of ammunition (450,000 rounds) and 162 members of the Voluntary Militia for Territorial Security.

On 28 June 1940 at 12:10, about 50 mi (43 nmi; 80 km) west of Zakynthos, the convoy was sighted by a British reconnaissance Short Sunderland plane. As they were within striking range of the British 7th Cruiser Squadron, composed of light cruisers Liverpool, Orion, Neptune, Gloucester and Sydney, Admiral John Tovey ordered them to intercept the Italians. The Italian column was sighted by the Allied ships around 18:30, about 100 miles north of Tobruk, and at 18:36 Liverpool opened fire from 22,000 yd (20,000 m) at the surprised Italian flotilla. At 18:59 Orion also opened fire from 18,000 yd (16,000 m). The Italian destroyers were theoretically faster than the British cruisers, but due to their age and heavy cargo on board their speed advantage was nullified. In addition, Espero's third boiler turned out to be defective, limiting the destroyer's speed to just 25 knots (46 km/h; 29 mph). Captain Baroni, therefore, decided to sacrifice his Espero in order to cover the escape of Zeffiro and Ostro, and ordered them to disengage and sail for Benghazi at full speed. Espero laid smokescreens and conducted evasive maneuvers, engaging Liverpool's division with guns, and simultaneously firing three torpedoes at Orion. While Liverpool and Gloucester took on Espero, the other three cruisers tried to get around the smokescreens to attack the fleeing Ostro and Zeffiro, but were ordered to abandon their pursuit and concentrate on Espero instead. Due to zigzagging Espero managed to avoid being hit, but by 19:20 the range between her and Liverpool had shortened to 14,000 yd (13,000 m). In fact, Italians drew first blood, when a single Italian 4.7 in (120 mm) shell hit Liverpool just 3 ft above the waterline, with splinters penetrating the warheads of two torpedoes, but caused little damage otherwise. Despite heavy firing, Espero was not hit until 20:00, when her engine rooms were struck bringing the vessel to a stop. The 7th Squadron expended about 5,000 shells, more than 1,600 of main caliber, before the Italian destroyer was sunk, after 130 minutes of fierce fighting. Sydney rescued 47 out of 225 men from the Italian destroyer, and thirty six more escaped on rafts, but only six of them were later found alive by Italian submarine Topazio almost 20 days later. Captain Baroni died aboard his ship, and was posthumously awarded the Medaglia d´oro al valor militare.

On the morning of 29 June 1940 Ostro and Zeffiro arrived in Benghazi before proceeding to Tobruk where they arrived on July 1.

Another Italian convoy sailed to Tobruk on 30 June 1940 from Augusta carrying troops, supplies, ammunition and fuel. The convoy consisted of six cargo and passenger ships and was escorted by 6 destroyers and 4 torpedo boats. The Royal Navy failed to intercept this convoy, in large part due to the large ammunition expenditure in their previous confrontation. On 5 July 1940 there were seven Turbine-class destroyers berthed in Tobruk harbor together with four torpedo boats, six freighters and several auxiliary vessels. Between 10:00 to 11:15 a Short Sunderland reconnaissance plane overflew the harbor at an altitude of 1,500-2,000 meters and despite the anti-aircraft fire opened against it, confirmed the presence of numerous ships in the harbor. In the late afternoon a group of nine Fairey Swordfish torpedo bombers of 813 Naval Air Squadron took off from the airfield in Sidi Barrani and headed towards Tobruk. The air alarm was sounded at 20:06 but the Italians failed to detect the Allied aircraft until they were already over the harbor at 20:20. Destroyers had most of their personnel on board steamers Liguria and Sabbia with exception of dedicated air defense crews. The attack commenced a few minutes later, and lasted only seven minutes and resulted in five Italian ships being sunk or damaged. Not encountering any aerial opposition, British torpedo bombers attacked from low altitude (around 100 feet), and released their torpedoes from 400 to 500 meters away, almost point-blank. Zeffiro was attacked first by a plane piloted by Nicholas Kennedy, whose torpedo hit Zeffiro in the bow, around the ammunition depot, between the bridge and a 120 mm cannon. The explosion broke the ship into two and sank it half an hour later. Freighter Manzoni was also hit, capsized and sank, while Euro and steamer Serenitas were hit, and had to be beached, and the ocean liner Liguria was hit and damaged. Two planes also attacked other destroyers, but failed to launch their torpedoes due to intense anti-aircraft fire. The air alarm was canceled at 21:31, and by that time all nine British planes were far away.

There were 21 casualties among Zeffiro's crew, 10 killed and 11 missing, and 20 wounded.

== Bibliography ==
- Brescia, Maurizio (2012). Mussolini's Navy: A Reference Guide to the Regina Marina 1930–45. Annapolis, Maryland: Naval Institute Press. ISBN 978-1-59114-544-8.
- Fraccaroli, Aldo (1968). Italian Warships of World War II. Shepperton, UK: Ian Allan. ISBN 0-7110-0002-6.
- Greene, Jack & Massignani, Alessandro (1998). The Naval War in the Mediterranean, 1940–1943. London: Chatham Publishing. ISBN 1-86176-057-4.
- Gustavsson, Hakan (2010). Desert Prelude 1940-41: Early Clashes. Casemate Publishers. ISBN 978-8389450524.
- McMurtrie, Francis E., ed. (1937). Jane's Fighting Ships 1937. London: Sampson Low. OCLC 927896922.
- O'Hara, Vincent P. (2009). Struggle for the Middle Sea: The Great Navies at War in the Mediterranean Theater, 1940–1945. Annapolis, Maryland: Naval Institute Press. ISBN 978-1-59114-648-3.
- Roberts, John (1980). "Italy". In Chesneau, Roger (ed.). Conway's All the World's Fighting Ships 1922–1946. New York: Mayflower Books. pp. 280–317. ISBN 0-8317-0303-2.
- Rohwer, Jürgen (2005). Chronology of the War at Sea 1939–1945: The Naval History of World War Two (Third Revised ed.). Annapolis, Maryland: Naval Institute Press. ISBN 1-59114-119-2.
- Whitley, M. J. (1988). Destroyers of World War 2: An International Encyclopedia. Annapolis, Maryland: Naval Institute Press. ISBN 1-85409-521-8.
- Brown, David (2013). The Royal Navy and the Mediterranean: Vol.I: September 1939 - October 1940. Routledge. ISBN 978-1135281540.
