= HMS Minotaur =

Six ships of the Royal Navy have borne the name HMS Minotaur after the minotaur, a creature in Greek mythology:

- HMS Minotaur (1793) was a 74-gun third-rate ship of the line launched in 1793. She fought at the battles of the Nile and Trafalgar and was wrecked in 1810 off Texel.
- HMS Minotaur (1816) was a 74-gun third rate launched in 1816, renamed Hermes in 1866 and broken up in 1869.
- HMS Minotaur (1863), ordered as Elephant but renamed Minotaur before being launched in 1863, was the lead ship of the Minotaur class of ironclad armoured frigates. She was renamed Boscawen II in 1904, Ganges in 1906 and Ganges II in 1908, and broken up in 1922.
- HMS Minotaur (1906) was the lead ship of the Minotaur class of armoured cruisers, launched in 1906 and broken up in 1920.
- HMS Minotaur was to have been a Arethusa-class light cruiser. However, this ship was cancelled and reordered as a new Town-class light cruiser named HMS Newcastle.
- HMS Minotaur was the lead ship of the Minotaur class of light cruisers, launched in 1943. She was transferred to the Royal Canadian Navy in 1944 and renamed HMCS Ontario. She was decommissioned in 1958 and broken up in 1960.
