= Minotaur-class cruiser =

Minotaur-class cruiser may refer to:

- Minotaur-class cruiser (1906), a class of Royal Navy armoured cruisers launched in 1906–1907
- Minotaur-class cruiser (1943), a class of Royal Navy light cruisers launched in 1943–1945
- Minotaur-class cruiser (1947), a projected class of Royal Navy cruisers, a design both finalised and cancelled in 1947

== See also ==
- Minotaur-class ironclad (1863), a class of Royal Navy ironclads, launched in 1863–1867
