= Town-class cruiser (1936) =

Class of British light cruisers

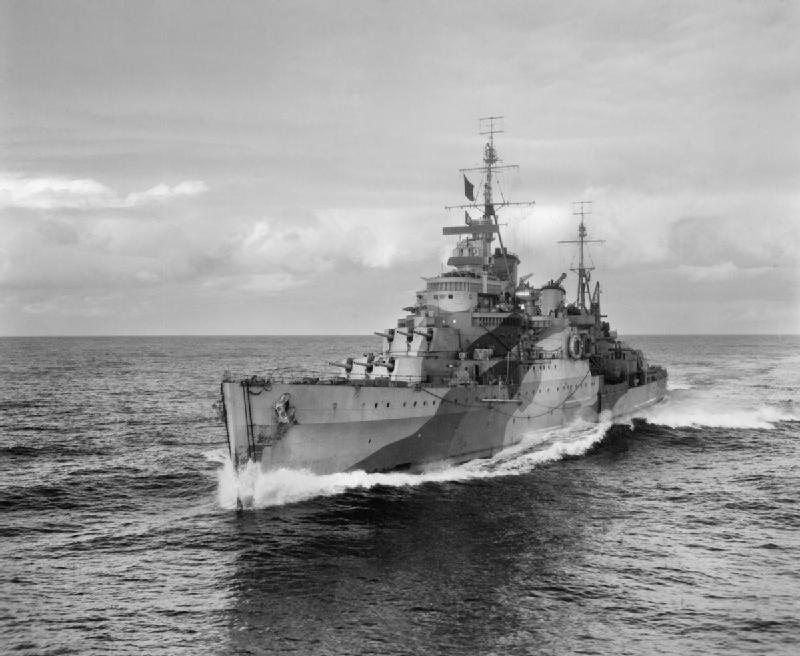
- Liverpool in 1942

Class overview
- Name: Town class
- Builders: Devonport Dockyard (2); Fairfield Shipbuilding & Eng. (1); Harland and Wolff (1); Hawthorn Leslie (1); John Brown & Co. (1); Scotts Shipbuilding & Eng. (1); Swan Hunter (1); Vickers-Armstrongs (2)
- Operators: Royal Navy
- Preceded by: Arethusa class
- Succeeded by: Crown Colony class; Dido class
- Subclasses: Southampton; Gloucester; Edinburgh
- Built: 1934–1939
- In commission: 1937–1963
- Completed: 10
- Lost: 4
- Retired: 5
- Preserved: 1

General characteristics
- Class & type: Light cruiser
- Displacement: Southampton class: 11,540 long tons (11,730 t); Gloucester class: 11,930 long tons (12,120 t); Edinburgh class: 13,175 long tons (13,386 t)
- Length: Southampton and Gloucester classes: 591 ft 7.2 in (180.3 m); Edinburgh class: 613 ft 7.2 in (187.0 m)
- Beam: Southampton class: 62 ft 3.6 in (19.0 m); Gloucester and Edinburgh classes: 64 ft 10.8 in (19.8 m)
- Draught: Southampton class: 20 ft (6.10 m); Gloucester class: 20 ft 7.2 in (6.28 m); Edinburgh class: 22 ft 7.2 in (6.89 m)
- Installed power: 4 × Admiralty 3-drum boilers; Southampton class: 75,000 shp (55,900 kW); Gloucester and Edinburgh classes: 82,500 shp (61,500 kW)
- Propulsion: 4 × shafts; 4 × steam turbines
- Speed: Southampton class:32 knots (59 km/h; 37 mph); Gloucester and Edinburgh classes:32.25 knots (59.73 km/h; 37.11 mph)
- Range: 5,300 nmi (9,800 km; 6,100 mi) at 13 knots (24 km/h; 15 mph)
- Complement: 750
- Armament: Southampton and Gloucester classes, as designed: 12 × BL 6 in (152 mm) Mark XXIII guns (4 × 3); 8 × QF 4 in (102 mm) Mark XVI guns (4 × 2); 8 × QF 2-pounder (40 mm) Mark VIII pom-pom guns (2 × 4); 8 × .5 in (12.7 mm) Vickers machine guns; 6 × 21-inch (533 mm) torpedo tubes (2 × 3); Edinburgh class, as designed: 12 × BL 6-inch (152 mm) Mark XXIII guns (4 × 3); 12 × QF 4-inch (102 mm) Mark XVI guns (6 × 2); 16 × QF 2-pounder (40 mm) Mark VIII pom-pom anti-aircraft guns (2 × 8); 8 × .5-inch (12.7 mm) anti-aircraft machine guns (2 × 4); 6 × 21 in (533 mm) torpedo tubes (2 × 3)
- Aircraft carried: 2 × Supermarine Walrus flying boats (removed in the latter part of WWII)
- Aviation facilities: 1 × catapult

The Town class consisted of 10 light cruisers built for the Royal Navy during the 1930s. The Towns were designed within the constraints of the London Naval Treaty of 1930. The ships were built in the sub-classes, Southampton, Gloucester and Edinburgh, each sub-class adding more weaponry.

== Armament ==
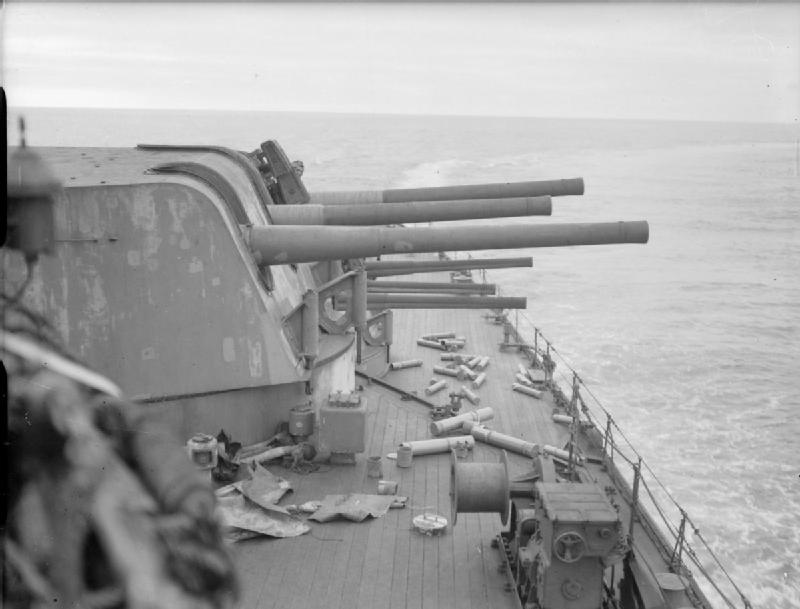
Mk XXII turret with rounded contours mounted on the Southampton sub-class

Like their US and Japanese counterparts, the Town-class cruisers were "light cruisers" in the strict terms of the London Treaty, which defined a "light cruiser" as one having a main armament no greater than 6.1 in (154.9 mm) calibre. All three naval powers sought to circumvent the limitations on heavy cruiser numbers by building light cruisers that were equal in size and effective power to heavy cruisers. These ships made up for their smaller calibre guns by carrying more of them.

All ships of the class carried BL 6-inch Mk XXIII guns in triple turrets, with the centre gun mounted 30 in (760 mm) behind the two outer guns to prevent interference between the shells in flight and to give the gunners more room to work in. The turret roofs had cutouts at the front to allow extreme elevation, originally intended to give the guns an anti-aircraft capability. In practice the guns could not be trained or manually loaded quickly enough for continuous anti-aircraft fire, so the Royal Navy designed the Auto Barrage Unit (ABU) which allowed the guns to be loaded with time-fuzed shells and then fired when the target aircraft reached a set range. These ships were equipped with the HACS AA fire control system for the secondary armament and the Admiralty Fire Control Table for surface fire control of the main armament.

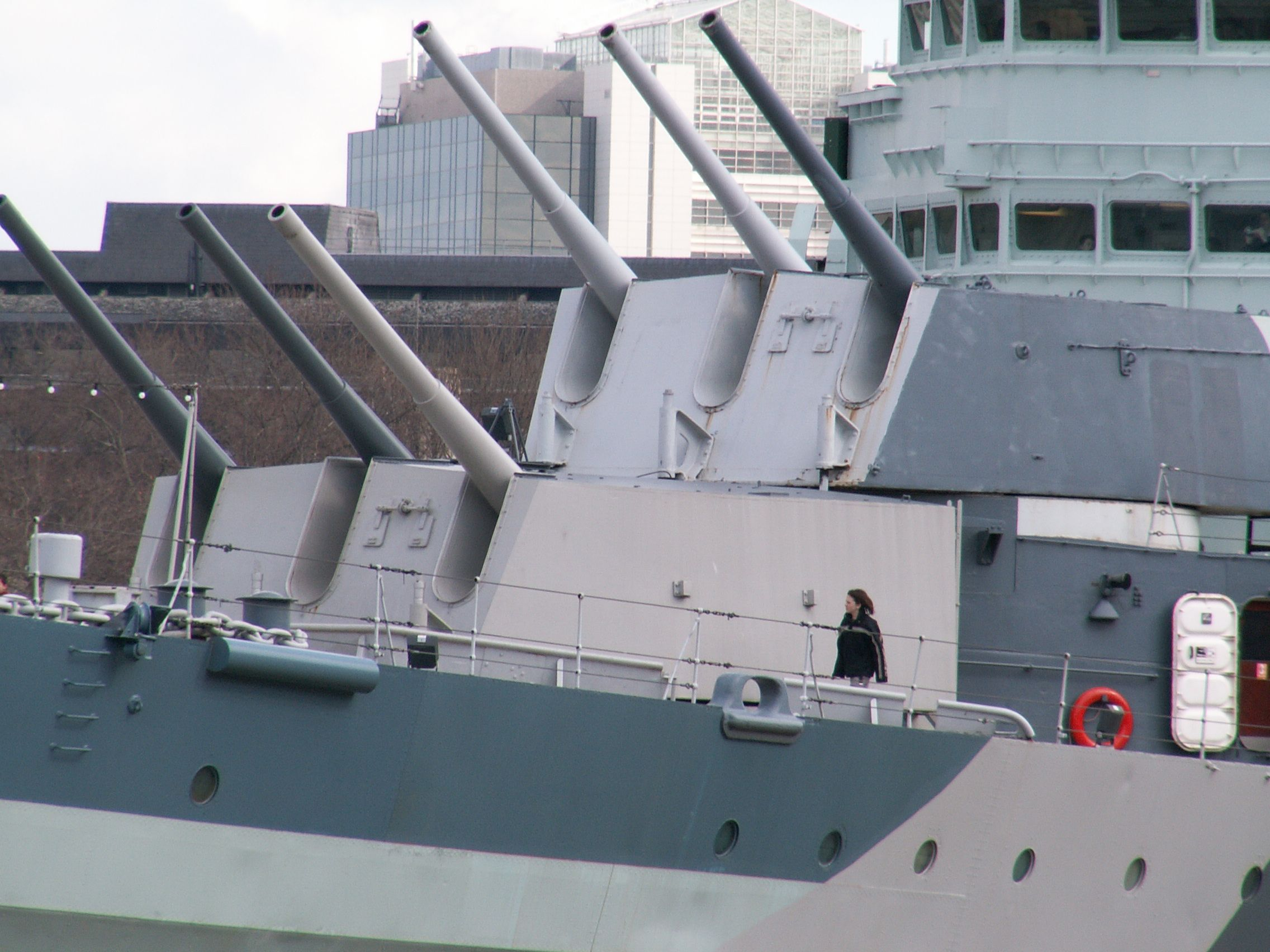
Mk XXIII turret with squared-off contours mounted on the Edinburgh sub-class

The secondary armament consisted of four twin Mk XIX 4-inch turrets, and two 2-pounder quad pom-poms. Additional light anti-aircraft weapons were added during the war and the 4-inch mounts were converted to Remote Power Control (RPC). Postwar HMS Birmingham and Newcastle were partially reconstructed in 1949–1951 with enclosed bridges, new lattice masts, improved surface fire control, long range radar and an improved but still unreliable version of the Glasshouse Directors with Type 275 'lock and follow' radar, with flyplane control for the twin 4-inch guns with elevation speed increased to 15–20 degrees per second to engage faster jet aircraft. Similar electronic alterations were made to Sheffield but it received less structural alteration. Liverpool was put into reserve in 1952 to preserve it for potential modernisation and Glasgow had a less extensive refit to allow her to be sent quickly if needed in the Suez crisis of 1956. Birmingham, Newcastle and Sheffield had the pom-pom and 20 mm armament replaced by 40 mm Bofors mounts. Belfast was fitted with MRS 8 HACDT to combine 40 mm and twin 4-inch AA fire and to permit the use of 40 mm proximity fuze ammunition as used by the British Army.

== Sub-classes ==
=== Southampton ===
In the mid-1930s, the Arethusa-class cruiser was the Royal Navy's latest light cruiser design, with six vessels to be built. Following the new, heavily armed small cruisers of the United States Brooklyn and Japanese Mogami-classes, the last two planned ships, Minotaur and Polyphemus, were cancelled and re-ordered as a new, much larger cruiser type, with the new ships named Newcastle and Southampton. (Note: In Bassett's book, it was speculated that the entire class would have conformed to a theme representative of Greek history and mythos had the Admiralty decided against renaming the two vessels.) Based on the initial design chosen in November 1933, the estimated cost of the new ships was £2.1m each compared to an estimated cost of £1.6m each for a Leander-class cruiser.

Initially the class was designated the "M" or "Minotaur" class but was renamed the Town class in November 1934. Uniquely, the final Southampton class cruiser, Birmingham, was built with a fully flared bow and is easily distinguished by the lack of the prominent knuckle found on her sister-ships. This was due to some elements in the Admiralty doubting the benefits offered by the knuckle design. This modification was introduced during construction in March 1935 but was not continued in the follow-on Gloucester class.

=== Gloucester ===
The subsequent Gloucesters added a second director control tower for two channels of fire at long range against ship or shore targets and better protection against plunging fire, with a redesigned deck, an intermediate layer of armour above the magazines and machinery area and received thicker armour on the gun turrets. The extra weight is balanced with extra beam, increased from 64.02 ft (19.51 m) in the Southampton to 64.10 ft (19.54 m) in the three Gloucester ships and more propulsion power with 82,000 shp (61,000 kW) engines to maintain speed and add more electrical generation.

=== Edinburgh ===
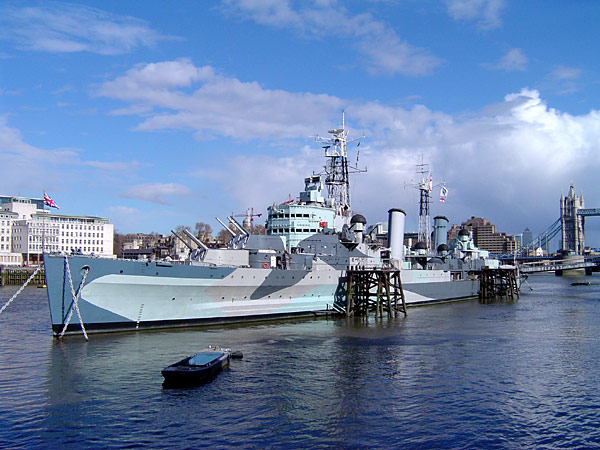
HMS Belfast moored by Tower Bridge

The Edinburgh class were longer at 614 ft (187 m) compared to 592 ft (180 m), initially to allow an increase in the main armament from twelve 6 in (152 mm) guns in four triple turrets as in the two previous sub-classes, to sixteen 6-inch guns in four quadruple turrets. The idea was soon shelved however due to the difficulties in actually manufacturing an effective quadruple 6inch turret and so the class reverted to the original main armament design, although improved through a "long trunk" Mk XXIII turret design, which reduced the crew requirements and increased the speed of the ammunition hoists. Four extra 4 in (102 mm) "High Angle Low Angle" guns and eight extra 2-pounder (40 mm) guns and further armour protection were added instead. Additional ships using the design of Belfast were considered by the Admiralty in 1940 but were eventually rejected.

== Later improvements ==
All were heavily modified during the Second World War and after the Korean War; Glasgow, Sheffield and Newcastle had one aft turret replaced by two quad 40 mm Bofors guns during the war, since there was insufficient space to fit the extra anti-aircraft guns and retain the turret. This was not a problem in the Edinburghs, because they were longer and had more room. They still had substantial modifications to their weaponry, including addition of 40 mm Bofors guns. More radar equipment added during the war aided the ships' combat effectiveness.

== Service ==
The first Town-class ship was launched in 1936 and commissioned in 1937, two years before the outbreak of war. The class saw much service during the war and took part in many famous actions, such as the sinking of the German battleship Scharnhorst. Four ships — Edinburgh, Gloucester, Manchester, and Southampton — were sunk during the war. The surviving ships continued in active service to the end of the 1950s, some seeing action during the Korean War. The last Town-class ship to be scrapped was Sheffield in 1967. One ship of the Town class — Belfast — remains, moored on the River Thames in London as a museum-ship of the Imperial War Museum, a role she has performed since 1971.

== Ships ==
Construction data
Name	Pennant	Subclass	Builder	Laid down	Launched	Commissioned	Fate
Newcastle (ex-Minotaur)	C76	Southampton	Vickers-Armstrongs, Newcastle	4 October 1934	23 January 1936	5 March 1937	Broken up at Faslane, 1959
Southampton (ex-Polyphemus)	C83	Southampton	John Brown, Clydebank	21 November 1934	10 March 1936	6 March 1937	Scuttled following air attack off Malta, 11 January 1941
Sheffield	C24	Southampton	Vickers-Armstrongs, Newcastle	31 January 1935	23 July 1936	25 August 1937	Broken up at Faslane, 1967
Glasgow	C21	Southampton	Scotts, Greenock	16 April 1935	20 June 1936	9 September 1937	Broken up at Blyth, 1958
Birmingham	C19	Southampton	HM Dockyard, Devonport	18 July 1935	1 September 1936	18 November 1937	Broken up at Inverkeithing, 1960
Liverpool	C11	Gloucester	Fairfields, Govan	17 February 1936	24 March 1937	2 November 1938	Broken up at Bo'Ness, 1958
Manchester	C15	Gloucester	Hawthorn Leslie, Hebburn	28 March 1936	12 April 1937	4 August 1938	Scuttled following torpedo attack off Cap Bon, 13 August 1942
Gloucester	C62	Gloucester	HM Dockyard, Devonport	22 September 1936	19 October 1937	31 January 1939	Sunk following air attack off Crete, 22 May 1941.
Belfast	C35	Edinburgh	Harland and Wolff, Belfast	10 December 1936	17 March 1938	5 August 1939	Preserved as museum ship in London
Edinburgh	C16	Edinburgh	Swan Hunter, Newcastle	30 December 1936	31 March 1938	6 July 1939	Scuttled following torpedo attack, 2 May 1942

== See also ==
- Fiji-class cruiser
