= The Minotaur (novel) =

2005 novel by Ruth Rendell

- First edition (UK)
- Author: Barbara Vine (Ruth Rendell)
- Language: English
- Genre: Crime / Mystery novel
- Publisher: Viking (UK); Shaye Areheart Books (US)
- Publication date: April 7, 2005
- Publication place: United Kingdom
- Media type: Print (Hardcover, Paperback) & Audio CD
- Pages: 320 pp (hardcover)
- ISBN: 0-670-91573-4
- OCLC: 57382246
- Preceded by: The Blood Doctor

The Minotaur is a novel by British writer Ruth Rendell, written under the pseudonym Barbara Vine. It was first published in 2005.
