= HMS Liverpool (C11) =

Town-class cruiser

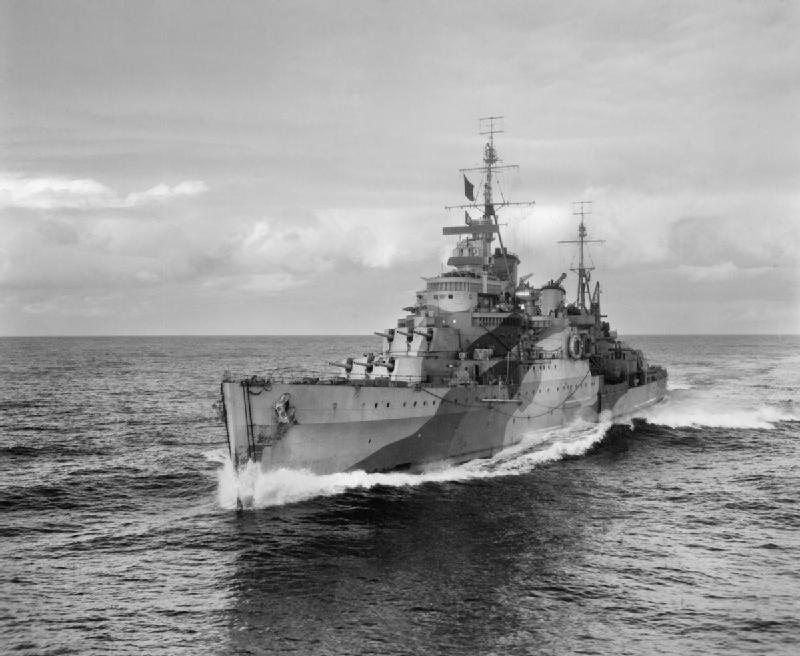
- Liverpool underway, 28 February 1942

History

United Kingdom
- Name: Liverpool
- Namesake: Liverpool
- Ordered: 1935
- Builder: Fairfield Shipbuilding and Engineering Company, Govan
- Laid down: 17 February 1936
- Launched: 24 March 1937
- Commissioned: 2 November 1938
- Decommissioned: 1952
- Identification: Pennant number: C11
- Honours and awards: Mediterranean 1940; Calabria 1940; Arctic Convoys 1942; Malta Convoys 1942
- Fate: Sold for scrap, July 1958

General characteristics (as built)
- Class & type: Town-class light cruiser
- Displacement: 9,394 long tons (9,545 t) (standard); 11,930 long tons (12,120 t) (full load)
- Length: 591 ft (180 m) overall
- Beam: 64 ft 10 in (19.76 m)
- Draught: 20 ft 7 in (6.27 m)
- Installed power: 4 Admiralty 3-drum boilers; 82,500 shp (61,500 kW)
- Propulsion: 4 shafts; 4 geared steam turbine sets
- Speed: 32.3 knots (59.8 km/h; 37.2 mph)
- Range: 6,000 nmi (11,000 km; 6,900 mi) at 14 knots (26 km/h; 16 mph)
- Complement: 800–850
- Armament: 4 × triple 6 in (152 mm) guns; 4 × twin 4 in (102 mm) guns; 2 × quadruple 2-pdr (40 mm) guns; 2 × quadruple 0.5 in (12.7 mm) AA machine guns; 2 × triple 21 in (533 mm) torpedo tubes
- Armour: Box protection: 4–1 inch (102–25 mm); Waterline belt: 4 inches (102 mm); Bulkheads: 2 inches (51 mm); Gun turrets: 4–2 inches (102–51 mm)
- Aircraft carried: Three Supermarine Walrus; one catapult

HMS Liverpool, named after the port city of Liverpool in north-west England, was a Town-class cruiser of the Royal Navy in service from 1938 to 1952.

During the Second World War, Liverpool gained four battle honours and was seriously damaged in two attacks by Italian torpedo bombers. The cruiser operated variously with the naval stations in the East Indies and China and with the Mediterranean and Home fleets. While assigned as flagship to the China Station in January 1940, the cruiser instigated a diplomatic incident with Japan when she intercepted the liner Asama Maru off the coast of Japan. Liverpool took part in the battles of the Espero Convoy and Calabria, the Arctic Convoys, and Operation Harpoon during the Malta Convoys. On 14 June 1942, during Operation Harpoon, Liverpool suffered an air attack and had to undergo repairs and refitting at Rosyth, Scotland for the remainder of the war.

Liverpool returned to service in 1945 and was assigned as flagship to the Mediterranean Fleet. In the early 1950s, the cruiser harboured in Port Said to support the British Administration of the Suez Canal Zone, when Egyptian guerrillas campaigned against it. The cruiser was decommissioned in 1952 at a time when the Royal Navy was rapidly contracting in strength. Liverpool was broken up in 1958, at Rosyth.

== Design and description ==
The Town-class light cruisers were designed as counters to the Japanese Mogami-class cruisers built during the early 1930s and the second batch of three ships was enlarged, with the most powerful engines and widest beam of any post 1927 Royal Navy cruisers, to maintain speed and stability with the weight of, a second low angle main director (2) T284 LADCT, to give two channel fire control of the six inch turrets enabling, simultaneous engagement with surface targets fore and aft of the cruisers and to give a second level of deck armour over the top of the armour box around the four main magazines (In HMS Gloucester and the third 'Belfast' group, the extra deck armour belt also extended further over the engines). Liverpool displaced 9,394 long tons (9,545 t) at standard load and 11,930 long tons (12,120 t) at deep load. The ship had an overall length of 591 feet (180.1 m), a beam of 64 feet 10 inches (19.8 m) and a draught of 20 feet 7 inches (6.3 m). She was powered by four Parsons geared steam turbine sets, each driving one shaft, which developed a total of 82,500 shaft horsepower (61,500 kW) and gave a maximum speed of 32.3 knots (59.8 km/h; 37.2 mph). Liverpool also mounted a catapult with three Supermarine Walrus. Steam for the turbines was provided by four Admiralty 3-drum boilers. The ship carried a maximum of 2,075 long tons (2,108 t) of fuel oil which gave her a range of 6,000 nautical miles (11,110 km; 6,900 mi) at 14 knots (26 km/h; 16 mph). The ship's complement was 800–850 officers and ratings.

The Town-class ships mounted twelve BL six-inch (152 mm) Mk XXIII guns in four triple-gun turrets. The turrets were designated 'A', 'B', 'X' and 'Y' from front to rear. Their secondary armament consisted of eight QF four-inch (102 mm) Mk XVI dual-purpose guns in twin mounts. Their light anti-aircraft armament consisted of a pair of quadruple mounts for the two-pounder (40 mm) AA gun ("pom-pom") and two quadruple mounts for 0.5-inch (12.7 mm) Vickers AA machine guns. The ships carried two above-water, triple mounts for 21-inch (533 mm) torpedoes.

The ship lacked a full-length waterline armour belt. The sides of Liverpool's boiler and engine rooms and the sides of the magazines were protected by 4.5 inches (114 mm) of armour. The top of the magazines and the machinery spaces were protected by 2 inches (51 mm) of armour. The armour protecting the main gun turrets had a thickness of 2–4 inches.

== History ==
=== Commission (1935–1939) ===
Procured in response to the American Brooklyn and Japanese Mogami classes of light cruiser, the Town class consisted of three variants for a total of 10 ships. These ships were intended for fleet duties rather than trade protection, which their predecessors had been designed for. The class represented a significant improvement in armament and armour, which provided reasonable protection against 8-inch (200 mm) shells. Their primary armament of twelve 6-inch (150 mm) guns in triple turrets, compared to the eight and six guns possessed by the preceding Leander and Arethusa classes, still adhered to the constraints of the London Naval Treaty. Liverpool became one of the three Town-class cruisers—with Gloucester and Manchester—ordered to a slightly revised design referred to as the Liverpool, Liverpool, or Type II sub-class. The second group retained an almost identical configuration, differentiated only by a beam enlarged to 62.4 feet (19.0 m) (compared to Southampton's beam of 61.8 feet (18.8 m)), a redesigned bridge, and improved fire control equipment.

Ordered under the 1935 estimates, the keel of Liverpool was laid down at Govan on 17 February 1936 and launched on 24 March 1937 by Priscilla Norman, wife of the Governor of the Bank of England Montagu Norman. Liverpool became the first cruiser launched at the Fairfield shipyard since the County class Norfolk. After being commissioned into the navy on 2 November 1938, Liverpool was assigned to the East Indies Station under the command of Captain A.D. Read. Before the deployment, the cruiser visited her namesake port in January 1939. The Liverpool Woman's Service Bureau presented the cruiser with a Union Flag and White Ensign, while the city's Corporation gave the crew "three pairs of candlesticks, a silver cup, and two bugles". Liverpool's crew had already received a silver bell and plate originally in the possession of her predecessor.

=== East Indies and China stations (1939–1940) ===
Before arriving in the East Indies, Liverpool prepared for the deployment in the Mediterranean for two months and had engine defects corrected. At the beginning of the Second World War, Liverpool formed part of the 4th Cruiser Squadron, which she left in November to transfer to the 5th Cruiser Squadron, China Station. While part of the station, the cruiser became involved in a diplomatic incident when she intercepted the Japanese passenger liner Asama Maru on 21 January 1940. Alerted to reports that German sailors in the United States had arranged transport to Germany, the British Government authorised the station's commander-in-chief to direct a warship to board Asama Maru and detain suspected passengers, provided the procedure did not occur within sight of the coast of Japan. Just 35 miles (56 km) east of Niijima, off Honshū, Liverpool located the liner and removed 21 of the ship's passengers, believed by the British to be survivors of the scuttled German liner Columbus. Asama Maru had been late and had deviated from her expected course, necessitating an operation much closer to Japan's coast.

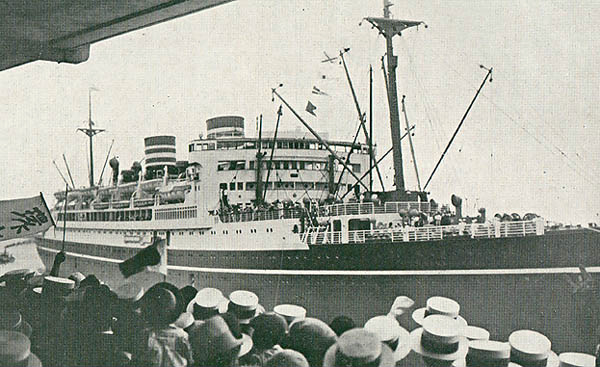
The Japanese liner Asama Maru, c. 1931

Liverpool discharged a warning shot across Asama Maru's bows to compel the liner to halt, afterwards deploying 12 men to conduct the search. Four days after the incident, the NYK Line dismissed Captain Watanabe, under the pretense of retirement, accusing him of "misconduct". The Government of Japan condemned the operation as an abuse of belligerent rights and formally protested the action, which further escalated tensions between the two countries. The Japanese and British governments sought to defuse the dispute through negotiation, and on 5 February, the two countries accepted a proposal which entailed the release of nine Germans in exchange for Japan pledging to deny military-age German citizens access to their vessels. In Australia's official history of the war, it was said that the most senior of the nine Germans, Captain Groth, remarked during his passage to Japan aboard the armed merchant cruiser Kanimbla that the operation had been "an excellent piece of work, and an action which would deter the remainder of the German crews still in the United States, approximately 1000 men, from making the passage".

In April, Liverpool became the flagship of Rear-Admiral Arthur Murray's Red Sea Force, which was formed with the Australian cruiser HMAS Hobart. The Red Sea Force was intended to help execute naval strategy in the area by performing a variety of duties, such as patrols and blockade enforcement in the event of war with Italy. While in the area, Liverpool escorted a convoy transporting contingents from the Australian military to Suez. When ordered to the Mediterranean in June, Liverpool relinquished her status as flagship with the transfer of Admiral Murray to the New Zealand cruiser HMNZS Leander at Port Sudan. To accommodate the admiral and his staff, Leander transferred three officers and seven ratings to Liverpool.

=== First torpedoing (1940–1941) ===
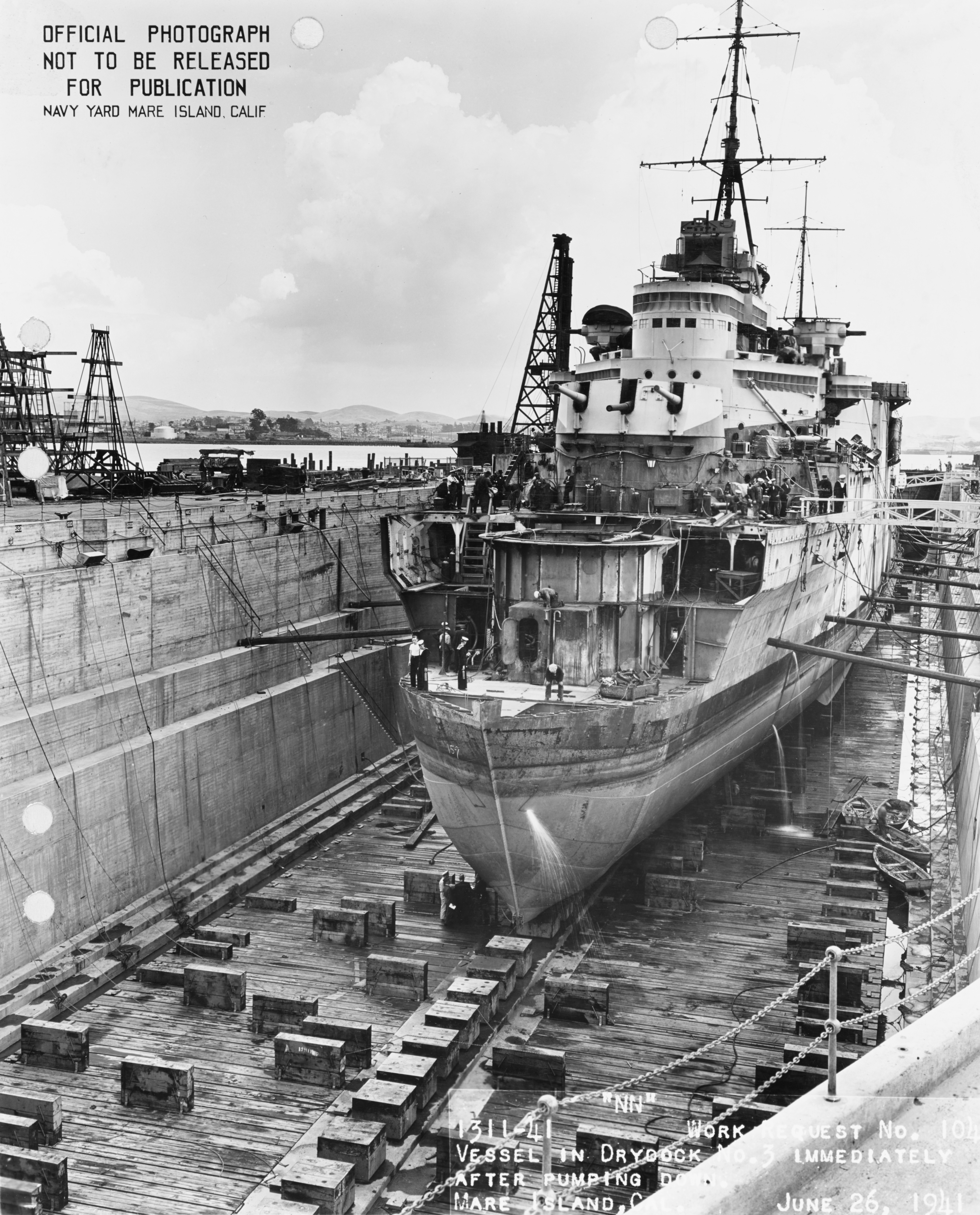
HMS Liverpool in dry dock at Mare Island Naval Shipyard, 26 June 1941. The ship is fitted with a provisional false bow.

Liverpool formed part of the 7th Cruiser Squadron, becoming one of nine cruisers that could be fielded by the Mediterranean Fleet shortly after Fascist Italy entered the war. She first encountered Italian vessels off the coast of Libya on 12 June 1940 while shelling positions near Tobruk with Gloucester and four destroyers. The cruisers attacked five vessels, including the obsolete armoured cruiser San Giorgio, and sank the minesweeper Giovanni Berta. On 28 June, a British Short Sunderland patrol aircraft detected three Italian destroyers west of Zante. The 7th Cruiser Squadron was at sea in support of convoy Operation MA.3 when it altered course to engage the destroyers. Liverpool sighted them 60 miles (97 km) south-west of Cape Matapan at 18:30 and opened fire three minutes later. The ensuing action, carried out at a minimum range of about 14,000 yards (8.0 mi), resulted in the destruction of the Italian Espero The two surviving destroyers reached Benghazi with their supplies. Liverpool took light damage in the engagement. Ammunition had been rapidly depleted by the cruiser squadron. By the close of the action, Liverpool's crew had almost expended the contents of her shellrooms, reporting that each gun had 40 shells remaining. The Admiralty criticised the squadron's expenditure of some 5,000 6-inch (150 mm) rounds, which Admiral Andrew Cunningham, commander-in-chief of the Mediterranean Fleet, attributed to its inexperience and his insistence on confronting the Italian warships before nightfall. Nevertheless, the use of such a large volume of shells caused the cancellation of MA.3, which had encompassed two convoys from the besieged island of Malta.

The Mediterranean Fleet followed MA.3 with Operation MA.5 in early July. During the course of the deployment, Admiral Cunningham received reports of a large formation of Italian warships and changed course towards Taranto to intercept. On 9 July, the fleets encountered each other off Calabria, in the first major battle between the Allied and Italian navies in the Mediterranean theatre. Liverpool and fellow cruiser Neptune commenced firing at 15:22, eight minutes after Italian cruisers started their barrage at a range of 23,600 yards (13.4 mi). After a continuous exchange of fire, the battleship Warspite struck the Italian battleship Giulio Cesare at 16:00, inducing the Italian fleet to disengage from the battle. Italian aircraft attacked Liverpool with bombs on 12 July while she was returning to Alexandria, Egypt, causing fatalities and wounding three, including the cruiser's commander. Later in July, Liverpool escorted convoy AN.2 from Egypt on its way to Greek ports in the Aegean and the southward-convoy AS.2 from the Aegean. The latter convoy came under substantial attack by Italian aircraft on the 29th; Liverpool was the only vessel hit when an unexploded bomb penetrated two decks, killing a rating. The casualty was Stoker First Class Patrick Leslie Harney, aged 32, from Stalybridge, Cheshire.

When the Mediterranean Light Forces restructured in August, Liverpool was switched to the 3rd Cruiser Squadron, grouped with Gloucester and Kent under the command of Rear-Admiral Edward de Faye Renouf. On 28 September, as part of Operation MB.5, Liverpool and Gloucester proceeded to Malta, transporting reinforcements, airmen, and RAF provisions. The cruisers—briefly protected by a force consisting of the battleships Valiant and Warspite, aircraft carrier Illustrious with her aircraft, cruisers Orion, York and the Australian HMAS Sydney, and 11 destroyers—came under repeated aerial attack. Both cruisers later detached from the naval force and reached the island on the 30th.

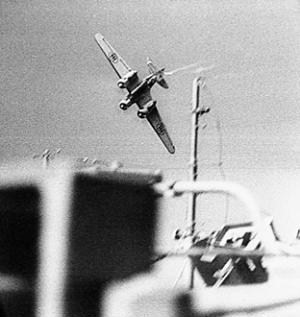
A Savoia-Marchetti SM.79 attacking an unidentified Malta convoy. Liverpool was torpedoed twice by this type of plane.

The fleet again put to sea on 8 October with the intention of supporting Malta convoy MF.3 and the Alexandria-bound convoy MF.4, while seeking to engineer an encounter with the main assets of the Italian Navy. Although Admiral Cunningham did not realise his latter objective, which was limited to an engagement with Italian destroyers, the convoys reached their respective destinations. Illustrious then conducted aerial operations against Italian installations on the island of Leros. While Liverpool and other escorts were returning from the sortie on 14 October, Italian torpedo-bombers attacked the cruiser, inflicting considerable damage to the forward section and causing fuel to be released from the aviation tank. Liverpool was torpedoed by a Savoia-Marchetti 278-6 piloted by Capitano Massimiliano Erasi. According to Captain Read, despite the petrol being surrounded with 70 tons of water in accordance with regulation, the fuel reached the mess decks and became exposed to an electrical short circuit. The subsequent explosion, at 19:20, seriously compromised Liverpool's bow structure, enveloped the forecastle in flames, and blew up the vacated "A" turret.

Liverpool's crew prepared the cruiser's Carley floats and other small craft while warships began to arrive at the scene. Orion, screened by the anti-aircraft cruisers Calcutta and Coventry, took her in tow at the stern. While being towed on 15 October, Liverpool's bow separated from the hull. Later in the day, 12 of the cruiser's sailors (including one unidentifiable at the time) were buried at sea. Three more died in the night and were buried before the two cruisers reached the port of Alexandria on 16 October. Liverpool's losses in the attack had amounted to 3 officers and 27 crewmen killed and 35 crewmen wounded. Her captain transferred in late October to the battleship Ramillies; his successor being Commander Welby. According to the journal of Midshipman William Hayes, Liverpool, like nearby warships, had been forewarned of an imminent attack via radio direction finder (RDF), but the inexperienced rating on watch at his post did not report this to his superiors because of apparent confusion.

As part of the ship's interim repairs, Liverpool had a provisional false bow constructed and fitted. Once able to embark on a prolonged voyage, Liverpool steamed to the United States to have her bow reconstructed at Mare Island Naval Shipyard in Vallejo, California. The ship's presence would not be disclosed until September when the US Navy Department released a list identifying 12 ships situated in various ports. At the shipyard, Liverpool had her anti-aircraft armament increased with the addition of nine single 20 mm Oerlikon cannons. She departed in November for Britain, principally to have upgraded radar systems installed.

=== Second torpedoing (1942–1945) ===
After returning to active service, Liverpool became subordinate to the 18th Cruiser Squadron at Scapa Flow and deployed in support of the Arctic convoys. The conditions that Allied ships endured during the convoys proved extreme, with freezing weather, snowstorms, and frequent attacks by the Luftwaffe and Germany Navy. Liverpool arrived in the Arctic as a replacement for the damaged cruiser Trinidad. She joined Convoy QP 10, comprising 16 merchant vessels and five destroyers, on 12 April 1942 as an escort on its journey from the Russian Kola Peninsula to Iceland. The convoy came under repeated attack from U-boats and aircraft for three days. Four vessels were sunk (two of which sank on 11 April) and one was damaged; QP 10 arrived at Reykjavík on the 21st.

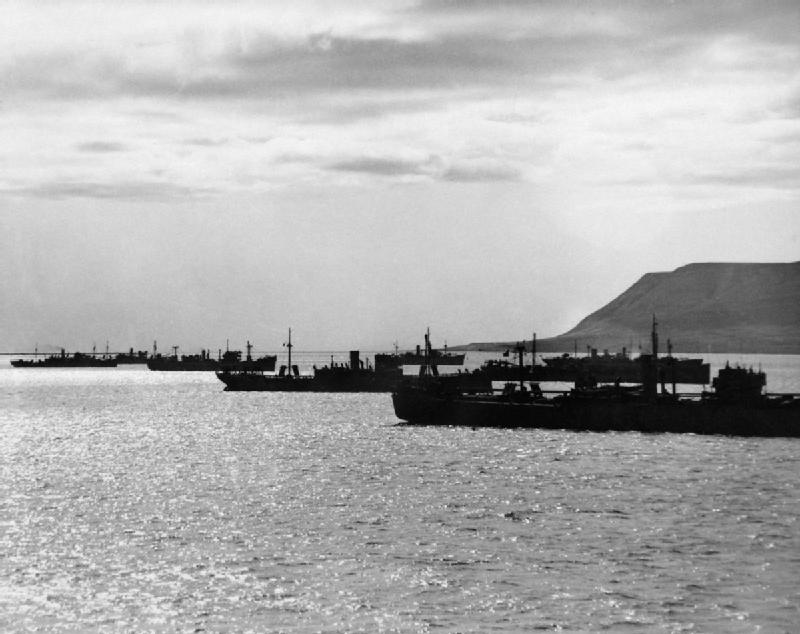
A convoy of vessels at the Allied naval base of Hvalfjörður, Iceland, viewed from the aircraft carrier Victorious, May 1942

In mid-May, Liverpool joined a group of warships that was to have escorted Trinidad on her return journey to Britain. After temporary repairs in Russia, Trinidad got underway on 13 May. The group that included Liverpool positioned itself west of Bear Island, in the Barents Sea, to rendezvous with the cruiser. On 14 May, Trinidad came under repeated attack and was set ablaze by bombs. The British had to evacuate and sink her the following day when the fire became uncontrollable. Liverpool and the rest of Rear-Admiral Burrough's group came under attack themselves on the return journey. On 25 May, Liverpool began escorting PQ 16, a convoy of 35 merchant vessels bound for Murmansk, the largest convoy yet undertaken in support of the Soviet Union. PQ 16 had considerable protection, including the light and heavy cruisers Nigeria, Kent, and Norfolk, and numerous destroyers and submarines, with distant cover provided by the Home Fleet. Inevitably, the convoy came under attack, beginning with a sortie on 25 May that damaged the freighter SS Carlton. Sustained attacks from U-boats and at least 242 German aircraft yielded a total of seven vessels sunk on 26–27 May. The cruiser escort switched to the returning convoy QP 12 on 26 May.

Liverpool returned to the Mediterranean in June to participate in Operation Harpoon, part of the Malta Convoys. While assigned to Force W covering convoy WS.19 on 14 June, Liverpool and the convoy came under attack by at least 38 Axis aircraft. During the attack an italian SM 79 torpedo bomber hit Liverpool. ultimately depriving the convoy of a close cruiser escort as Kenya and Charybdis were covering Force W's aircraft carriers when Italian ships attacked the surviving merchantmen and destroyers. The torpedo that impacted Liverpool's starboard side hit the engine room, partially flooding the cruiser and disabling her machinery and steering gear. Reduced to a speed of 4 knots (7.4 km/h), Liverpool had to be taken under tow by the destroyer Antelope. For the rest of the day, Italian aircraft focused on Liverpool rather than the convoy. Before arriving at Gibraltar on 17 June, the group came under further air attack and Liverpool incurred additional damage due to near misses. For Liverpool, casualties from the original attack were recorded in the ship's log as 15 killed and 22 wounded. The fatalities from the torpedoing had remained in the engine room and been affected by heat exposure, requiring the distribution of an additional tot of rum to the volunteer retrieval party.

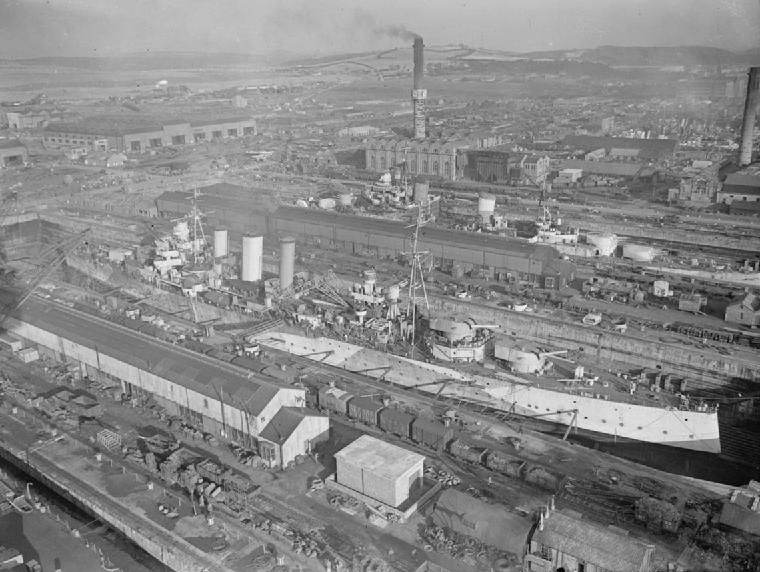
Liverpool (background) in drydock at Rosyth in 1943 alongside Berwick (foreground)

Liverpool received temporary repairs at Gibraltar and returned to Britain in August. Although repairs at Rosyth were completed by July 1943, sufficient personnel would not be assigned to Liverpool until late 1945. At Rosyth, Liverpool underwent an extended period of refitting and maintenance. The refit upgraded Liverpool's radar equipment, removed "X" turret and the aircraft catapult, and enlarged the cruiser's defensive armament (which included an increase to 16 Bofors 40 mm, in six twin and four single mounts).

=== Post-Second World War (1945–1958) ===
Liverpool returned to service in October 1945 to join the 15th Cruiser Squadron of the Mediterranean Fleet, in which she served mostly as a flagship. In October 1946, Liverpool's visit to Greece was interrupted by the Corfu Channel mining of the destroyers Saumarez and Volage. With Admiral Algernon Willis embarked, Liverpool steamed to Corfu in response, and briefly received the wounded captain of Saumarez at Corfu Bay. In April 1948, the cruiser transported Olympic torches and related items in preparation for the ceremonial prelude to the Summer Olympic Games in London.

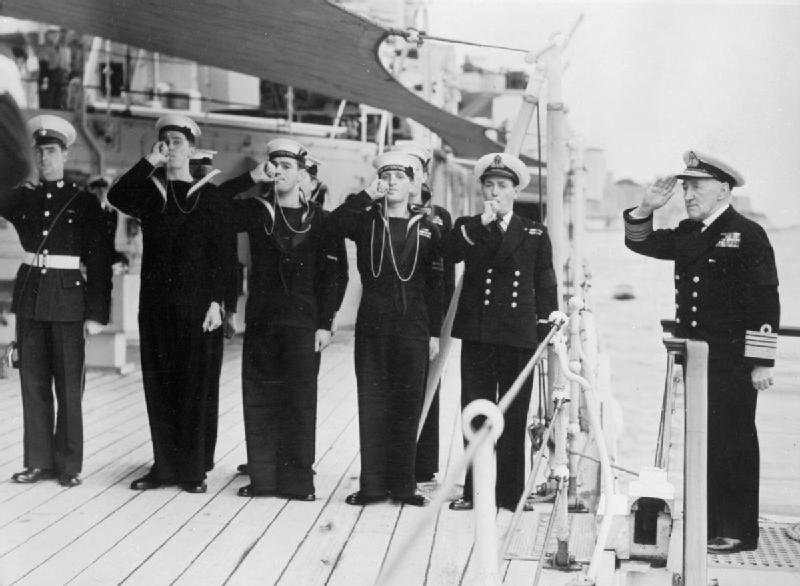
Admiral Rhoderick McGrigor, First Sea Lord, being piped on board Liverpool at Valletta, Malta, in 1952. The cruiser was serving as the flagship of the Mediterranean Fleet.

While docked in the harbour of Alexandria on 22 January 1950, Liverpool entertained King Farouk. Given a 21-gun salute by the cruiser, Farouk met Vice-Admiral Louis Mountbatten and the ambassador to Egypt and later expressed his "pleasure at the visit and at renewing my acquaintance with the Royal Navy." In September 1951, Liverpool, as flagship of Admiral John Edelsten, became the first British warship to visit Yugoslavia post-war and was inspected by the country's leader Marshal Tito in the city of Split. It had been the Royal Navy's first official visit to the country in 12 years.

Following the abrogation of the Anglo-Egyptian Treaty in October 1951, the Royal Navy dispatched vessels to Port Said after dock workers declared a strike protesting the British administration of the Suez Canal Zone. The cruisers Gambia and Liverpool consecutively assumed responsibility for dock operations, supplying men to replace unavailable workers and guard against guerrilla attacks on facilities. In January, Egyptian media accused Liverpool of firing her guns into the port during an engagement with guerrillas, which the British military vehemently denied and attributed to misidentification.

Upon decommission in 1952, Liverpool entered the reserve at Portsmouth Naval Dockyard. Liverpool became an accommodation ship at Portsmouth and was used by the "Senior Officer, Reserve Fleet" and his staff. Comprehensive plans were drawn up for the modernisation of HMS Liverpool. The Town class cruisers were assessed as suitable for mounting three of the new twin Mk 26 twin 6 inch guns, while the smaller Fiji and Minotaur class cruisers could accommodate only two. HMS Belfast and HMS Liverpool as the two largest Town-class cruisers were considered priorities for modernisation in the early 1950s and with the Minotaur-class cruisers, HMS Superb and HMS Swiftsure, were the only wartime legacy cruisers for which a full ships cover was drawn, for modernisation with postwar weapons systems. However, the gradual rationalisation of the Royal Navy began in earnest in the 1950s under Duncan Sandys' 1957 Defence White Paper, and the reserve of at least 551 ships was abolished. With the complete withdrawal from service of wartime cruisers by the 1960s, the roles of Liverpool and her contemporaries effectively became superseded by the County-class guided missile destroyers and the three cruisers of the Tiger class. She was sold in 1958 for breaking up at Bo'ness, Scotland, taking twelve months to be completely dismantled. Her bell is on display in Liverpool Anglican Cathedral.
