= List of ships of World War II (M) =

The List of ships of the Second World War contains major military vessels of the war, arranged alphabetically and by type. The list includes armed vessels that served during the war and in the immediate aftermath, inclusive of localized ongoing combat operations, garrison surrenders, post-surrender occupation, colony re-occupation, troop and prisoner repatriation, to the end of 1945. For smaller vessels, see also list of World War II ships of less than 1000 tons. Some uncompleted Axis ships are included, out of historic interest. Ships are designated to the country under which they operated for the longest period of the Second World War, regardless of where they were built or previous service history. Submarines show submerged displacement.

Click on headers to sort column alphabetically.

List of ships of World War II (M)
Ship	Country or organization	Class	Type	Displacement (tons)	First commissioned	Fate
Macdonough	United States Navy	Farragut	destroyer	1,365	15 March 1935	scrapped 1947
MacKenzie	United States Navy	Benson	destroyer	1,620	21 November 1942	decommissioned 1946, sunk as target 1974
Macoma	Royal Netherlands Navy	Rapana	merchant aircraft carrier	8,000	1 April 1944	transferred to merchant service post-war
Macomb	United States Navy	Gleaves	destroyer	1,630	26 January 1942	to Japan 1954, to Taiwan 1970, scrapped 1980
Maddox	United States Navy	Gleaves	destroyer	1,630	31 October 1942	sunk 10 July 1943
Madison	United States Navy	Benson	destroyer	1,620	6 August 1940	decommissioned 1946, sunk as target 1969
Madras	Royal Indian Navy	Bathurst	corvette	1,025	12 May 1942	Decommissioned 1960
Madura	Royal Indian Navy	Basset	minesweeper	529	1941–1944	1941–1944
Magog	Royal Canadian Navy	River	frigate	1,445	7 May 1944	paid off 20 December 1944
Mahan	United States Navy	Mahan	destroyer	1,450	18 September 1936	sunk 7 December 1944
Mahratta	Royal Navy	M	destroyer	1,920	28 July 1942	sunk 25 February 1944
El Mahrousa	Egyptian Navy		yacht	3,417	1865	
Makassar Strait	United States Navy	Casablanca	escort carrier	7,800	27 April 1944	decommissioned 9 August 1946, scrapped 1961
Makin Island	United States Navy	Casablanca	escort carrier	7,800	9 May 1944	decommissioned 19 April 1946, scrapped 1947
Malaya	Royal Navy	Queen Elizabeth	battleship	31,000	1 February 1916	decommissioned 1944, scrapped 1948
Mallow	Royal Navy	Flower	corvette	925	2 July 1940	11 January 1944
Manila Bay	United States Navy	Casablanca	escort carrier	7,800	10 July 1943	decommissioned 31 July 1946, scrapped 1959
Manligheten	Swedish Navy	Äran	coastal defence ship	3,650		paid off 1950
Mansfield	Royal Navy	Town	destroyer	1,190	23 October 1940	paid off 22 June 1944
Manxman	Royal Navy	Abdiel	minelayer	2,650	20 June 1941	scrapped 1971
Maori	Royal Navy	Tribal	destroyer	2,020	2 January 1939	sunk 12 February 1942
Maplin	Royal Navy	Pegasus	fighter catapult ship		1932	
Marblehead	United States Navy	Omaha	light cruiser	7,050	8 September 1924	scrapped 1946
Marcílio Dias	Brazilian Navy	Marcílio Dias	destroyer	1,500	29 November 1943	Decommissioned 22 August 1972
Marcus Island	United States Navy	Casablanca	escort carrier	7,800	26 January 1944	decommissioned 12 December 1946, scrapped 1960
Marguerite	Royal Navy	Flower	corvette	925	20 November 1940	
Marigold	Royal Navy	Flower	corvette	925	28 February 1941	9 December 1942
Mariz e Barros	Brazilian Navy	Marcilio Dias	destroyer	1,500	29 November 1943	Decommissioned 22 August 1972
Marjoram	Royal Navy	Flower	corvette	925		cancelled 23 January 1941
Marne	Royal Navy	M	destroyer	1,920	2 December 1941	scrapped 1970
Marocain	United States Navy; Free French Naval Forces	Cannon	destroyer escort	1,240	29 February 1944	to Free French 29 February 1944, decommissioned May 1964
Marseillaise	French Navy	La Galissonniere	light cruiser	7,600	10 October 1937	scuttled 27 November 1942
Marshal Ney	Royal Navy	Marshal Ney	monitor	6,700		scrapped in 1957
Marshal Soult	Royal Navy	Marshal Ney	monitor	6,700		scrapped July 1946
Marsuinul	Royal Romanian Navy	Marsuinul	submarine	860 submerged	July 1943	captured by the Soviet Union August 1944, scrapped after the war
Martin	Royal Navy	M	destroyer	1,920		sunk 10 November 1942
Maryland	United States Navy	Colorado	battleship	32,600	21 July 1921	decommissioned 1947, scrapped 1959
Mashona	Royal Navy	Tribal	destroyer	2,020	28 March 1939	sunk 28 May 1941
Mason	United States Navy	Evarts	destroyer escort	1,140	20 March 1944	Scrapped 1947
Massachusetts	United States Navy	South Dakota	battleship	37,970	12 May 1942	Decommissioned 27 March 1947, museum ship
Matabele	Royal Navy	Tribal	destroyer	2,020	25 January 1939	sunk 17 January 1941
Matane	Royal Canadian Navy	River	frigate	1,445	22 October 1943	paid off 11 February 1946
Matanikau	United States Navy	Casablanca	escort carrier	7,800	22 May 1944	decommissioned 11 October 1946, scrapped 1960
Matapedia	Royal Canadian Navy	Flower	corvette	925	9 May 1941	paid off 16 June 1945
Matchless	Royal Navy	M	destroyer	1,920	12 February 1942	Decommissioned Apr 1946. Sold, Turkish Navy Aug 1957. Scrapped 1971
Maunder	Royal Navy		Special Service Ship	5,072	1919	paid off March 1941
Mauritius	Royal Navy	Fiji	light cruiser	8,000	1 January 1941	scrapped 1965
Maury	United States Navy	Gridley	destroyer	1,590	5 August 1938	scrapped 1946
Maxim Gorky	Soviet Navy	Maxim Gorkiy (Project 26 bis)	heavy cruiser	8,200	25 October 1940	Decommissioned Feb. 1956
Maya	Imperial Japanese Navy	Takao	heavy cruiser	13,350	30 June 1932	Sunk 23 October 1944
Mayasan Maru	Imperial Japanese Army	Type A	landing craft carrier	11,910	December 1942	sunk 17 November 1944
Mayflower	Royal Navy; Royal Canadian Navy	Flower	corvette	925	28 November 1940	to Canada 15 May 1941, paid off 31 May 1945
Mayo	United States Navy	Benson	destroyer	1,620	18 September 1940	decommissioned 1946, scrapped 1972
Mayrant	United States Navy	Benson	destroyer	1,500	13 September 1939	scuttled after A-bomb test 1948
McCall	United States Navy	Gridley	destroyer	1,590	22 June 1938	scrapped 1947
McCalla	United States Navy	Gleaves	destroyer	1,630	27 May 1942	to Turkey 1949, scrapped 1973
McCook	United States Navy	Gleaves	destroyer	1,630	15 March 1943	decommissioned 1949, scrapped 1973
McDougal	United States Navy	Porter	destroyer	1,850	23 December 1936	scrapped 1949
McLanahan	United States Navy	Benson	destroyer	1,620	19 December 1942	decommissioned 1946, scrapped 1974
Meade	United States Navy	Benson	destroyer	1,620	22 June 1942	decommissioned 1946, sunk as target 1973
Medway	Royal Navy		submarine tender	14,650	July 1929	sunk 30 June 1942
Melbreak	Royal Navy	Hunt	destroyer escort	1,050	10 October 1942	paid off and scrapped 1956
Melvin	United States Navy	Fletcher	destroyer	2,050	24 November 1943	Decommissioned 13 January 1954, scrapped 1975
Memphis	United States Navy	Omaha	light cruiser	7,050	17 December 1925	scrapped 1947
Mendip	Royal Navy	Hunt	destroyer escort	1,000	12 October 1940	paid off 20 May 1946, scrapped 1972
Mendoza	Argentine Navy	Mendoza	destroyer	1,570		Discarded 30 April 1962
Meon	Royal Navy; Royal Canadian Navy	River	frigate	1,445	31 December 1943	to Canada 7 February 1944, paid off 23 April 1945
Meredith	United States Navy	Gleaves	destroyer	1,630	1 March 1941	sunk 15 October 1942
Mervine	United States Navy	Gleaves	destroyer	1,630	17 June 1942	decommissioned 1949, scrapped 1969
Meteor	Royal Navy	M	destroyer	1,920	12 August 1942	
Meynell	Royal Navy	Hunt	destroyer escort	1,050	10 December 1940	scrapped 1978
Miami	United States Navy	Cleveland	light cruiser	11,800	28 December 1943	scrapped 1962
Miaoulis	Hellenic Navy	Hunt	destroyer escort	1,050	25 November 1942	paid off 1959, scrapped 1960
Michel	Kriegsmarine		auxiliary cruiser	10,900	7 September 1941	sunk 17 October 1943
Micmac	Royal Canadian Navy	Tribal	destroyer	1,927	18 September 1945	built and launched during war, paid off 31 March 1964
Middleton	Royal Navy	Hunt	destroyer escort	1,050	10 January 1943	scrapped February 1958
Midland	Royal Canadian Navy	Flower	corvette	925	17 November 1941	paid off 15 July 1945
Might	United States Navy	Flower modified	corvette	1,015	22 December 1942	9 October 1945
Mignonette	Royal Navy	Flower	corvette	925	7 May 1941	
Mikuma	Imperial Japanese Navy	Mogami	heavy cruiser	13,440	29 August 1935	Sunk 6 June 1942
Milne	Royal Navy	M	destroyer	1,935	6 August 1942	
Milwaukee	United States Navy; Soviet Navy	Omaha	light cruiser	7,050	20 June 1923; to USSR as Murmansk 20 April 1944	scrapped 10 December 1949
Mimico	Royal Canadian Navy	Flower modified	corvette	1,015	8 February 1944	18 July 1945
Mimosa	French Navy	Flower	corvette	925	11 May 1941	9 June 1942
Minas Geraes	Brazilian Navy	Minas Geraes	dreadnought	19,200	6 January 1910	Decommissioned 20 September 1953
Minegumo	Imperial Japanese Navy	Asashio	destroyer	1,961		
Minneapolis	United States Navy	New Orleans	heavy cruiser	9,950	19 May 1934	Decommissioned 10 February 1947, scrapped 1959
Miralda	Royal Navy	Rapana	merchant aircraft carrier	16,000	January 1944	returned to merchant service post-war; renamed Marisa
Misiones	Argentine Navy	Buenos Aires	destroyer	1,375		Discarded 3 May 1971
Misoa	Royal Navy	Maracaibo	landing ship, tank	4,193	11 August 1941	paid off March 1945
Mission Bay	United States Navy	Casablanca	escort carrier	7,800	26 May 1943	decommissioned 21 February 1947, scrapped 1959
Mississippi	United States Navy	New Mexico	battleship	32,000	25 January 1917	decommissioned 1956 (for scrap)
Missouri	United States Navy	Iowa	battleship	45,000	11 June 1944	decommissioned 1992; museum ship
Mobile	United States Navy	Cleveland	light cruiser	11,800	24 March 1943	scrapped 1960
Moffett	United States Navy	Porter	destroyer	1,850	28 August 1936	scrapped 1947
Mogami	Imperial Japanese Navy	Mogami	heavy cruiser	12,400	1935	Sunk 25 October 1944
Mohawk	Royal Navy	Tribal	destroyer	2,020	7 September 1938	sunk 16 April 1941
Molotov	Soviet Navy	Maxim Gorkiy (Project 26 bis)	heavy cruiser	8,200	25 October 1940	decommissioned February 1956
Monaghan	United States Navy	Farragut	destroyer	1,365	18 April 1935	foundered in typhoon 18 December 1944
Moncton	Royal Canadian Navy	Flower	corvette	925	24 April 1942	paid off 12 December 1945
Monkshood	Royal Navy	Flower	corvette	925	31 July 1941	
Monnow	Royal Navy; Royal Canadian Navy	River	frigate	1,445	11 May 1944	to Canada 3 August 1944, paid off 11 June 1945
Monowai	Royal New Zealand Navy		armed merchant cruiser	4,925	30 August 1940	Decommissioned 18 June 1943, then landing ship
Monssen	United States Navy	Gleaves	destroyer	1,630	14 March 1941	Sunk13 November 1942
Montbretia	Royal Norwegian Navy	Flower	corvette	925	29 September 1941	sunk 18 November 1942 by U-262
Montcalm	French Navy; Free French Naval Forces	La Galissonniere	light cruiser	7,600	15 November 1937	Decommissioned 1 May 1957
Montclare	Royal Navy		submarine tender	21,550	2 June 1942 (former AMC Montclare)	scrapped October 1954
Monterey	United States Navy	Independence	light aircraft carrier	11,000	17 June 1943	decommissioned 16 January 1956, scrapped 1971
Evans	Royal Navy; Royal Canadian Navy	Town	destroyer	1,247	23 October 1940	to Canada 1942, paid off 22 June 1944
Montpelier	United States Navy	Cleveland	light cruiser	11,800	9 September 1942	scrapped 1960
Montreal	Royal Canadian Navy	River	frigate	1,445	12 November 1943	paid off 15 October 1945
Montrose	Royal Navy	Admiralty	flotilla leader	1,530	14 September 1918	scrapped January 1946
Moose Jaw	Royal Canadian Navy	Flower	corvette	925	19 June 1941	paid off 8 July 1945
Morava	Royal Yugoslav Navy	Körös	river monitor	448	15 April 1920	scuttled 11 April 1941
Morden	Royal Canadian Navy	Flower	corvette	925	6 September 1941	paid off 29 June 1945
Moreno	Argentine Navy	Rivadavia	dreadnought	27,720	26 February 1915	scrapped February 1956
Morris	United States Navy	Sims	destroyer	1,570	5 March 1940	scrapped 1947
Morrison	United States Navy	Fletcher	destroyer	2,050 tons	18 December 1943	Sunk by kamikazes, 4 May 1945
Möwe	Kriegsmarine	Raubvogel	torpedo boat	1,213	1 October 1926	sunk 15 June 1944
Moyola	Royal Navy; Free French Naval Forces	River	frigate	1,370	15 October 1944	to France 15 October 1944, Decommissioned 1961
Mugford	United States Navy	Bagley	destroyer	1,500	16 August 1937	scuttled after A-bomb test 1948
Multan	Royal Indian Navy	Basset	minesweeper	529	1941–1944	1941–1944
Munda	United States Navy	Casablanca	escort carrier	7,800	8 July 1944	decommissioned 26 April 1946, scrapped 1960
Murasame	Imperial Japanese Navy	Shiratsuyu	destroyer	1,685	7 January 1937	sunk 4 March 1943
Murphy	United States Navy	Benson	destroyer	1,620	25 July 1942	decommissioned 1946, scrapped 1972
Musashi	Imperial Japanese Navy	Yamato	battleship	68,200	5 August 1942	sunk 25 October 1944
Musketeer	Royal Navy	M	destroyer	1,935	18 September 1942	scrapped 1955
Mustin	United States Navy	Sims	destroyer	1,570	15 September 1939	scuttled after A-bomb test 1948
Mutsu	Imperial Japanese Navy	Nagato	dreadnought	42,850	24 October 1921	sunk 8 June 1943
Muzio Attendolo	Regia Marina	Montecuccoli	light cruiser	3,184	1935	lost 1942
Myngs	Royal Navy	V	destroyer	1,830	23 June 1944	
Myōkō	Imperial Japanese Navy	Myōkō	heavy cruiser	13,380	1929	scuttled by Royal Navy 8 June 1946
Myosotis	Royal Navy	Flower	corvette	925	30 May 1941	
Myrmidon	Royal Navy; Polish Navy	M	destroyer	1,920	1941	to Poland as Orkan 18 November 1942, sunk 8 October 1943
