= HMS Mahratta =

Destroyer of the Royal Navy

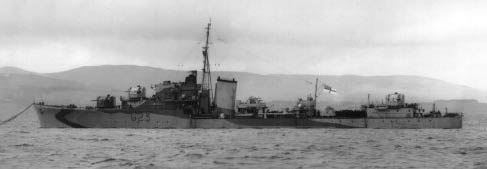
- HMS Mahratta at a buoy

History

United Kingdom
- Name: HMS Mahratta (Ex-HMS Marksman)
- Builder: Scotts, Greenock
- Yard number: 584
- Laid down: 18 August 1941
- Launched: 28 July 1942
- Commissioned: 8 April 1943
- Honours and awards: Arctic (1943–44)
- Fate: Sunk 25 February 1944

General characteristics (as built)
- Class & type: M-class destroyer
- Displacement: 1,920 long tons (1,950 t) (standard); 2,725 long tons (2,769 t) (deep load)
- Length: 362 ft 3 in (110.4 m) (o/a)
- Beam: 37 ft (11.3 m)
- Draught: 14 ft (4.3 m)
- Installed power: 48,000 shp (36,000 kW); 2 × Admiralty 3-drum boilers
- Propulsion: 2 × shafts; 2 × geared steam turbines
- Speed: 36 knots (67 km/h; 41 mph)
- Range: 5,500 nmi (10,200 km; 6,300 mi) at 15 knots (28 km/h; 17 mph)
- Complement: 190
- Sensors & processing systems: ASDIC; Type 285 gunnery radar; Type 290 air warning radar
- Armament: 3 × twin 4.7 in (120 mm) Mk XI dual-purpose guns; 1 × single QF 4 in (102 mm) Mk V anti-aircraft gun; 1 × quadruple QF 2-pdr (40 mm) Mk VIII AA guns; 2 × single Oerlikon 20 mm (0.8 in) AA guns; 2 × quadruple, 2 × twin 0.5 in (12.7 mm) Vickers Mark III anti-aircraft machineguns; 1 × quadruple 21 in (533 mm) torpedo tubes; 42 × depth charges, 2 × racks, 2 × throwers

HMS Mahratta was an M-class destroyer of the Royal Navy which served during World War II. Begun as Marksman, she was damaged while under construction, and dismantled to be rebuilt on a new slipway. She was launched as Mahratta in 1942, completed in 1943, and quickly pressed into service. After a short but busy career in the North Atlantic and Arctic, largely guarding merchant convoys, she was torpedoed and sunk on 25 February 1944.

== History ==
Mahratta was originally to have been named Marksman. She was laid down on 21 January 1940 but the incomplete ship was blown off the slipway during an air raid in May 1941. Marksman was to have been the lead ship of the M-class destroyers, and the class was sometimes known as the Marksman class. Damage sustained by Marksman was so bad that she had to be dismantled and transferred to an alternative site. The new ship was laid down on 18 August 1941, but she was renamed Mahratta at her launch in July 1942, after the Maratha Empire of India, as a recognition of the financial support given by India to the war effort. Mahratta was adopted by the people of Walsall, who held a "Warship Week" from 7–14 February 1942, aiming to raise £700,000 – the cost of a warship. She was completed on 8 April 1943 and entered service on that date. During trials in May 1943 HMS Mahratta escorted RMS Queen Mary part way across the Atlantic.

=== Operation FH ===
HMS Mahratta departed Scapa Flow on 2 June 1943 with HMS Musketeer and HMS Onslaught, arriving back at Scapa Flow the same day. On 4 June Mahratta left Seidisfjord, Iceland bound for Spitzbergen, Norway as part of Operation FH, which was the relief of the garrison there.

=== Operation FJ ===
HMS Mahratta departed Scapa Flow on 8 June 1943 for Kola Inlet

In July 1943, HMS Mahratta and HMS Musketeer waited in Iceland for ice to clear before making a high speed run to Murmansk. Amongst her valuable cargo was a bathtub for an admiral.

=== Operation Camera ===
Operation Camera was a war game off the coast of Iceland to test the defences against an attempt by Tirpitz to break out from Kåfjord. The operation was based at Scapa Flow, departing on 7 July 1943. The other participants were HMS Duke of York, USS Ellyson, USS Emmons, USS Fitch, HMS Furious, HMS Glasgow, USS Macomb, HMS Meteor, HMS Milne, HMS Musketeer, USS Rodman, and USS South Dakota.

=== Operation Governor ===
Operation Governor was an attempt to lure Tirpitz and other heavy battleships out of harbour by simulating a raid on southern Norway. Operation Governor departed Hvalfjord on 26 July 1943. HMS Mahratta was part of Force A, other participants of Force A were HMS Anson, USS Alabama, USS Emmons, USS Fitch, HMS Illustrious, USS Macomb, HMS Meteor, HMS Milne, HMS Musketeer, and USS Rodman.

=== Operation SF ===
Operation SF departed Scapa Flow on 30 July 1943. Mahratta was part of Group B. She sailed with HMS Milne and HMS Musketeer to join HMS Oribi and HMS Orwell escorting oil tanker SS Blue Ranger.

=== Operation Lorry ===
Operation Lorry departed Skaalefjord on 26 August 1943. Mahratta was part of the 10th Cruiser Squadron. Operation Lorry enabled the passage of destroyers and stores to Kola in northern Russia. Tirpitz left her base in Kåfjord with several destroyers to attack the convoy, but was a few hours too late. Operation Lorry delivered parts and crew that were to service the Spitfires used for photo-reconnaissance in preparation for Operation Source.

=== Escort duties ===
In September 1943, Mahratta was sent to the Mediterranean with HMS Matchless to escort HMS Valiant to Plymouth for repairs. Matchless broke down on the way back, and was taken in tow by Mahratta. The chain later broke, and after this Mahratta rescued some survivors from a Coastal Command Halifax aircraft that had been shot down by a German U-boat. They had spent eleven days in the water. Mahratta arrived in Plymouth on 11 October 1943 and later that month sailed north again to Scapa Flow and Seidisfjord to escort Convoy JW 54A as part of Operation FR.

=== Operation FR ===
Operation FR was the despatch of escort ships to northern Russia which were to act as escorts for the first of the winter 1943 season convoys, Convoy RA 54A. Other participants were HNoMS Eglantine, HMS Harrier, HMS Matchless, HMS Milne, HMS Musketeer, HMS Saumarez, HMS Savage, HMS Scorpion, HMS Scourge, HMS Seagull, and HMS Westcott. Cover was provided by USS Augusta, HMS London, and HMS Middleton.

=== Convoy RA 54A ===
Convoy RA 54A, including the aircraft carrier Formidable and the battleship Anson, sailed from Kola Inlet on 1 November 1943. The departure of the convoy was delayed by thick fog, but allowed the convoy to reach Loch Ewe without being attacked.

=== Convoy JW 54A ===
Convoy JW 54A sailed on 22 November 1943, arriving at Archangel on 3 December. Again, the convoy managed to avoid being attacked.

=== Convoy RA 54B ===
Convoy RA 54B departed Archangel on 26 November 1943 bound for Loch Ewe. Passage was hampered by poor weather conditions, but the convoy did not come under attack.

=== Convoy JW 56B ===
Convoy JW 56B departed Loch Ewe on 22 January 1944 and arrived at Kola Inlet on 1 February.

During the passage the convoy was attacked. HMS Hardy was hit by a torpedo from the German submarine U-278 and HMS Venus later sank her.

=== Convoy RA 56 ===
Convoy RA 56 departed Kola Inlet on 3 February 1944 and arrived at Loch Ewe on 11 February 1944.

=== Convoy JW 57 ===
Convoy JW 57 sailed from Loch Ewe on 11 February 1944, arriving at Kola Inlet on 28 February.

On 23 February a Focke-Wulf Condor aircraft was spotted. Wildcats were flown from HMS Chaser and it was thought that they had driven the Condor away, but it kept watch at a distance. Several U-boats were spotted by the Wildcats and Swordfish aircraft were sent to attack any U-boats they could find. HMS Kessel was successful in sinking U-713 with depth charges.

== Loss ==
On 25 February 1944, a Catalina aircraft of 210 Squadron attacked and sank U-601 which was trailing the convoy. Mahratta was struck by two T5 Gnat torpedoes fired by U-990 off the coast of Norway. She sank at 71°17′N 13°30′E. Only 16 of the 236 crew survived.

Although Mahratta was lost, the convoy was a success. It was the largest convoy ever sent to Russia.

== Memorial ==
A memorial to those who lost their lives on the Arctic Convoys was unveiled at Murmansk in 1991, on the 50th anniversary of the first Arctic Convoy.
