= Peter McRae =

Argentine-born English cricketer

Personal information
- Full name: Foster Moverley McRae
- Born: 12 February 1916; Buenos Aires, Argentina
- Died: 25 February 1944 (aged 28); HMS Mahratta, Barentz Sea
- Batting: Right-handed

Domestic team information
- Years: Team
- 1936–1939: Somerset
- First-class debut: 22 August 1936 Somerset v Worcestershire
- Last First-class: 30 August 1939 Somerset v Northamptonshire

Career statistics
Competition	First-class
Matches	25
Runs scored	972
Batting average	24.30
100s/50s	1/4
Top score	107
Catches/stumpings	9/–
- Source: CricketArchive, 2 June 2010

Foster Moverley McRae, commonly known as Peter McRae (12 February 1916 – 25 February 1944) was an English cricketer who played 25 first-class matches for Somerset County Cricket Club between 1936 and 1939. He died during the Second World War, when HMS Mahratta, which he served on as Surgeon Lieutenant, was torpedoed and sunk in the Barents Sea.

== Military career ==
During the Second World War, McRae served in the Royal Naval Volunteer Reserve. He was Surgeon Lieutenant on HMS Mahratta when it was torpedoed by the German submarine U-990.

In 1941–1945 The Arctic Lookout, Noel Simon recounts a story he was told of McRae's actions after the sinking:

Having managed to climb onto one of the few Carley floats to have come through the sinking, he set about hauling the others aboard. The float soon became overcrowded. Remarking almost casually; "There's not enough room for us all" the doctor slipped over the side into the sea and was never seen again.

He is commemorated on the Portsmouth Naval Memorial.
