= ORP Orkan (G90) =

Destroyer of the Polish Navy during World War II

Coordinates: 56°08′N 27°05′W

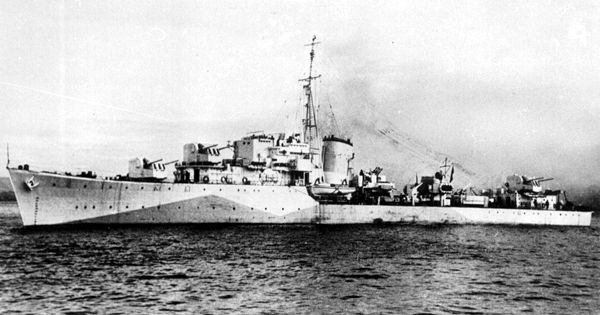

History

United Kingdom
- Name: HMS Myrmidon
- Namesake: Myrmidon
- Builder: Fairfield Shipbuilding and Engineering Company, Govan, Scotland
- Laid down: 7 December 1939
- Launched: 2 March 1942
- Stricken: 18 November 1942
- Fate: transferred to the Polish Navy

Poland
- Name: ORP Orkan
- Namesake: European windstorm
- Acquired: 18 November 1942
- Commissioned: 18 November 1942
- Fate: Sunk, 8 October 1943

General characteristics (as built)
- Class & type: M-class destroyer
- Displacement: 1,920 long tons (1,950 t) (standard); 2,725 long tons (2,769 t) (deep load)
- Length: 362 ft 3 in (110.4 m) (o/a)
- Beam: 37 ft (11.3 m)
- Draught: 14 ft (4.3 m)
- Installed power: 48,000 shp (36,000 kW); 2 × Admiralty 3-drum boilers
- Propulsion: 2 × shafts; 2 × geared steam turbines
- Speed: 36 knots (67 km/h; 41 mph)
- Range: 5,500 nmi (10,200 km; 6,300 mi) at 15 knots (28 km/h; 17 mph)
- Complement: 190
- Sensors & processing systems: ASDIC; Type 285 gunnery radar; Type 290 air warning radar
- Armament: 3 × twin 4.7 in (120 mm) Mk XI dual-purpose guns; 1 × single QF 4 in (102 mm) Mk V anti-aircraft gun; 1 × quadruple QF 2-pdr (40 mm) Mk VIII AA guns; 2 × single Oerlikon 20 mm (0.8 in) AA guns; 2 × quadruple, 2 × twin 0.5 in (12.7 mm) Vickers Mark III anti-aircraft machineguns; 1 × quadruple 21 in (533 mm) torpedo tubes; 42 × depth charges, 2 × racks, 2 × throwers

ORP Orkan, formerly HMS Myrmidon, was an M-class destroyer of the Polish Navy during World War II. Orkan is Polish for "hurricane".

The destroyer was sunk by the German submarine U-378 on 8 October 1943. There were 179 dead and 44 survivors. The sinking of Orkan was the biggest life loss of Polish Navy resulting from a single incident in its entire history.

== Description ==
The M-class destroyers were repeats of the preceding L class. They displaced 1,935 long tons (1,966 t) at standard load and 2,750 long tons (2,790 t) at deep load. The ships had an overall length of 362 feet 3 inches (110.4 m), a beam of 37 feet (11.3 m) and a deep draught of 14 feet (4.3 m). They were powered by Parsons geared steam turbines, each driving one propeller shaft, using steam provided by two Admiralty three-drum boilers. The turbines developed a total of 48,000 shaft horsepower (36,000 kW) and gave a maximum speed of 36 knots (67 km/h; 41 mph). The ships carried a maximum of 567 long tons (576 t) of fuel oil that gave them a range of 5,500 nautical miles (10,200 km; 6,300 mi) at 15 knots (28 km/h; 17 mph). The ships' complement was 190 officers and ratings.

The M class mounted six 4.7-inch (120 mm) Mark XI guns in twin-gun mounts, two superfiring in front of the bridge and one aft of the superstructure. The aft torpedo tubes were replaced by a single QF 4-inch Mk V anti-aircraft gun. Their light anti-aircraft suite was composed of one quadruple mount for 2-pounder "pom-pom" guns, two single Oerlikon 20 mm cannon and two quadruple and two twin mounts for 0.5 inch Vickers Mark III anti-aircraft machinegun. Later in the war, single Oerlikons replaced the .50-calibre machineguns and, still later, twin Oerlikon mounts replaced four of the singles. The M-class ships completed with only one above-water quadruple mount for 21-inch (533 mm) torpedoes, but the aft mount was later replaced and the 4-inch AA gun removed. The ships were equipped with two depth charge throwers, two racks and 42 depth charges.

== Construction ==
She was built by the Fairfield Shipbuilding and Engineering Company in Govan, Scotland. She was originally commissioned into the Royal Navy as HMS Myrmidon and was funded by St Helens as the result of the Warships Week National Savings campaign.

== Service ==
She was transferred to the free Polish Navy based in Britain in December 1942. Orkan served in the Arctic, In early 1943, the destroyer escorted the convoy JW 53 to Russia, returned with the convoy RA 52 and then operated as convoy escort in the North Atlantic. In July 1943, she transferred the body of the Polish Supreme Chief General Władysław Sikorski from Gibraltar to England.

At 07.05 hours on 8 October 1943, Orkan (under Lt. Stanisław Hryniewiecki), serving as one of the escorts of the convoy SC 143, was hit by a GNAT homing torpedo from U-378 while escorting the convoy SC 143 and sank within a few minutes. One officer and 43 ratings were rescued by HMS Musketeer.

The sinking of Orkan was the biggest life loss of Polish Navy resulting from a single incident in its entire history.
