= HMS Lightning (G55) =

L-class destroyer of the Royal Navy

Coordinates: 37°53′N 9°50′E

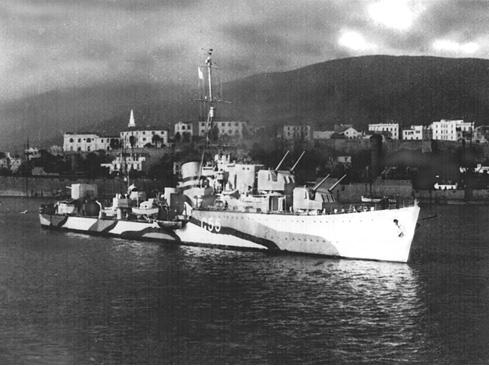

History

United Kingdom
- Name: HMS Lightning
- Ordered: 31 March 1938
- Builder: Hawthorn Leslie & Co., Newcastle upon Tyne
- Laid down: 15 November 1938
- Launched: 22 April 1940
- Commissioned: 28 May 1941
- Identification: Pennant number: G55
- Honours and awards: Diégo Suarez (1942); Malta Convoys (1941–2)
- Fate: Sunk by German torpedo boats, 12 March 1943
- Badge: On a Field Black, three rays of gold lightning.

General characteristics
- Class & type: L-class destroyer
- Displacement: 1,920 tons
- Length: 362.5 ft (110.5 m)
- Beam: 37 ft (11 m)
- Draught: 12.5 ft (3.8 m)
- Propulsion: 2 geared turbines
- Speed: 33.8 kn (62.6 km/h; 38.9 mph) at 341.4 rpm
- Range: 5,500 nmi (10,200 km; 6,300 mi)
- Armament: Original configuration: 6 × QF 4.7 in Mk.XI L/50 (119 mm), twin mounts HA/LA Mk.XX; 1 × 4-inch Mark V AA gun; 4 × QF 2 pdr Mk.VIII L/39 (40 mm), quad mount Mk.VII; 8 × QF 0.5 in Mk.III Vickers (12.7 mm), quad mounts Mk.III; 4 × tubes for 21 inch (533 mm) torpedoes, quad mount Mk.IX; November 1942: 6 × QF 4.7 in Mk.XI L/50 (119 mm), twin mounts HA/LA Mk.XX; 4 × QF 2 pdr Mk.VIII L/39 (40 mm), quad mount Mk.VII; 4 × 20mm Oerlikon guns; 8 × tubes for 21 in torpedoes, quad mounts Mk.IX

HMS Lightning was an L-class destroyer of the Royal Navy. She was launched on 22 April 1940 and sunk on 12 March 1943 by German Motor Torpedo Boat S-55.

Ordered under the 1937 Programme and laid down as Job No J4502, Hawthorn Leslie & Co of Newcastle Upon Tyne were awarded the contract to build her with machinery supplied by Parsons. She would be the 10th Royal Navy ship to bear the name Lightning. Build was completed on 28 May 1941 but had been delayed by late delivery of the three twin 4.7-inch mountings required meeting the original design. The tender cost was £440,807 which excluded items such as weapons and communications equipment supplied by the Admiralty.

On 25 March 1942, Lightning was adopted by the Borough of Doncaster as part of a Warship Week National Savings plan. Doncaster and the surrounding boroughs raised over £800,000 in National Savings and effectively paid for the ship. At the same time T/S Lightning was formed in Doncaster for Sea Cadets, that continues to this day. HMS Lightning was the subject of an Oscar Parkes drawing created into a popular postcard by J Salmon Ltd Sevenoaks Kent.

== Operational history ==
On 28 May 1941, Lightning was assigned to the 19th Destroyer Flotilla with the Home Fleet at Scapa Flow. She was joined by her sister ship Laforey. Her other two sister ships Lookout and Loyal were not ready for combat. She was however joined by four half-sister ships Lively, Gurkha, Legion and Lance. All four would later be lost during their first year of operational service.

=== Operation Substance ===
Operation Substance was the first real operation Lightning was part of. She formed part of the Home Fleet escort for convoys WS 9C and MG 1 to the island of Malta. The convoy comprised ships Azalea, Eridge, Nelson, Renown, Ark Royal, Hermione, Arethusa, Manxman, Cossack, Maori, Nestor, Faulknor, Fury, Foresight, Forester, Foxhound, Encounter, Sikh and Duncan. The convoy left Derry on 13 July, and arrived at Gibraltar two weeks later on 27 July.

Her next operation was Operation Style in which Lightning escorting a small convoy of Royal Air Force reinforcements. She did not escort the convoy all the way and arrived back in Gibraltar on 4 August, just as the main convoy arrived in Malta. On 22 August 1941 Lightning sailed from Scapa Flow with Lively and Newark to search for the crippled Free French submarine Rubis, which had been attacked by a German aircraft off the coast of Norway. She was later met by the cruiser Curacoa and eventually found Rubis near the Skagerrak and escorted her into Dundee for repairs.

=== Operation Halberd ===
Lightning and Laforey left Greenock for the first major Malta convoy of the war on 17 September 1941, crossing the Clyde Boom at 0530. Lightning joined the convoy with many of the capital ships from the Home Fleet. These included Prince of Wales, Edinburgh, Kenya, Euryalus, Sheffield, Oribi, Cossack, Fury, Farndale and Heythrop. She then passed through the Straits of Gibraltar and met up with Force H. Throughout the operation Lightning would see some of her heaviest fighting. She and the rest of the convoy were attacked by German bombers who used a mixture of high altitude bombing, dive bombing and low level torpedo bombing. At 1340 on 27 September 1941 Lightning was very nearly hit. A torpedo from an aircraft missed the ship by 20 yards (18 m).

On 25 October Lightning left the Clyde and was transferred from the Home Fleet, based at Scapa Flow, to Force H based at Gibraltar. During November and December 1941, as part of Force H, Lightning had a mainly escort role. Escorting convoys that were from the UK, picking them up in the Bay of Biscay and often taking them through the western part of the Mediterranean Sea towards Malta. She also escorted aircraft carriers carrying Supermarine Spitfires. Lightning was one of the escorts of the aircraft carrier Ark Royal when she was sunk by a torpedo on 13 November 1941.

On 11 December 1941, Lightning, Harvester and Highlander were ordered to leave Gibraltar and rendezvous with the battleship Duke of York, in mid Atlantic, and escort her to America. Duke of York was carrying Winston Churchill, and Chiefs of Staff to the Arcadia conference in Washington. Commander Stewart was taken ill just before sailing and First Lieutenant Bromley took command. Bad Atlantic weather delayed the rendezvous, at 1830 on 17 December in approximate position 38-30N, 23W joined Duke of York with Highlander and Harvester. With the bad weather continuing, the destroyers remained with Duke of York until 20 December then at 1800 in approximate position 35N, 40W, detached again to Ponta Delgada, Azores to refuel. Continuing to Bermuda where Lightning shared an anchorage with the US Navy aircraft carrier USS Ranger, they arrived at Newport News on New Year's Eve. Afterwards, they returned to the UK, pausing at St. John's, Newfoundland, departing 16 January 1942 and arriving at Greenock on 25 January, where Commander H G Walters took command.

On 14 March 1942 Lightning was taking part in an anti-submarine ASDIC sweep in the Gibraltar Straits when her rudder was badly damaged, one of the depth charges exploded underneath her prematurely. She had to return to Gibraltar for repairs in number two dry dock.

=== Operation Ironclad ===
During Operation Ironclad Lightning played a key role in the taking of a naval base at Diego Suarez. Lightning played her part without any action during this opening stage. However, at 1710 on 5 May 1942, Lightning bombarded a hill position that was being used by the enemy. The next day Lightning again bombarded enemy positions, this time a castle on a hilltop and an ammunition dump. At 1530 Lightning along with Laforey and Lookout escorted the battleship Ramillies out to sea to search for a reported enemy battleship which was not found, although Laforey sank an enemy submarine during night.

On 7 May 1942 at 1030 Lightning bombarded an enemy shore battery, on the far side of the peninsula, that would not surrender. Within half an hour of ceasing fire the battery surrendered.

After Operation Ironclad, Between May and July Lightning was temporary transferred to the Far East Fleet, sailing to Colombo in Ceylon, for a boiler clean. Completed by 11 July, the following day, at 0600, Lightning put to sea as 'A Force' with the battleship Warspite, the aircraft carriers Indomitable, Illustrious, the cruiser Gambia, and four destroyers including Laforey and Lookout. The task was to sweep the area to the Chagos islands to try to bring the Japanese to battle, and then proceed to Addu Atoll to oil. The monsoon season had arrived and no Japanese were found. Lightning returned to Colombo, and was ordered to proceed to the Mediterranean.

Returning from the Indian Ocean, Lightning arrived at Freetown. On 1 August, she departed in company with Laforey, Phoebe, Lookout and the aircraft carrier Indomitable. That same evening, at 2100, the ship's lookouts sighted three small boats and, after investigating, picked up all the crew of 35 plus 4 gunners and a dog (given to Lightning as a gift, and named ‘Flash’) from the 10,095 ton Norwegian merchant vessel Tankexpress. She had been sunk by a U-boat a week earlier (25 July 1942). The merchant crew, together with their captain, Anders Skånberg, were landed in Gibraltar, on 8 August while Lightning was refuelling.

=== Operation Pedestal ===
By mid 1942 the strategically important island of Malta was being starved by the German and Italian blockade. Without the island fortress the Allies could not strike at convoys from Italy that were supplying the Axis armies in North Africa. Further more, it was realised that an Allied North Africa campaign could not begin until the Axis armies had been weakened by lack of supplies. A huge escorting force from the Home Fleet and Force H from Gibraltar was assembled to escort fourteen merchant ships from the UK to Malta. Many capital ships were damaged in the desperate air and submarine attacks. Only six merchantmen got through but Malta was never under pressure again and so the Allied invasion of north Africa (Operation Torch) was made possible in November 1942.

Lightning joined Force Z comprising aircraft carrier Indomitable, cruiser Phoebe, and sisters Laforey and Lookout. On 3 August 1942 Force Z met up with the main Force X from the UK just off Gibraltar and refuelled alongside Indomitable the next day. On 5 August 1942 the convoy passed through the straits en route to Malta. On 11 August 1942 Lightning along with Lookout was screening the aircraft carrier Furious, when the nearby carrier Eagle was hit by four torpedoes from the German submarine U-73. In only eight minutes she had sunk. On 12 August 1942 Lightning came under attack from bombers and had several near misses during the raid.

Follow-up to Operation Torch November 1942

After refits, Lightning and Laforey left Greenock 12 December 1942 for Liverpool to escort Duchess of Richmond, a 20,000-ton Canadian Pacific liner which had embarked thousands of troops for North Africa, in convoy KMF 5. On 21 December Lightning helped rescue more than 1,000 soldiers and nurses from the 23,722 ton P&O liner Strathallan, which was torpedoed by U-562 off the coast of Algeria, carrying over 4,000 Allied personnel.

Lightning arrived in Bône on New Year's Day 1943 and joined Force Q which consisted at various times of two cruisers from the 12th cruiser squadron – Ajax, Penelope, Dido, Aurora and Sirius – supported by L-class destroyers including Laforey, Lookout and Loyal.

== The sinking of HMS Lightning ==
During late February and March 1943 Lightning was escorting troop and supply ships between Algiers and Bône in the day and attacking enemy convoys at night. When in harbour she was attacked every day by enemy aircraft and acted as an anti-aircraft ship. On her last voyage, Lightning left Bône alone at 1745 hours on the evening of Friday 12 March 1943 and after joining Loyal provided flanking screening cover to the cruisers Aurora and Sirius. The plan was to attack a German convoy out of Sicily bound for Tunisia. But when the convoy heard Lightning had left port, they returned to harbour. At 1851 hours Lightning was attacked by twelve German torpedo bombers. Lightning shot down one of the bombers and the attack itself failed to do any damage.

At about 2200 hours interpreters on board Lightning intercepted a radio message in German, stating that they were about to attack Lightning. At about 2215 hours the German motor torpedo boat (Schnellboot) S-158 of the 7th S-Boat Flotilla (First Lieutenant at Sea Schultze-Jena) fired the first torpedo, disabling Lightning. The ship's company had no time to return fire: they were not operating RDF, ASDIC or HF-DF and were not at full fighting condition due to heavy fighting that had been almost continuous during the past few days. The captain turned the ship hard to port to comb the track of the torpedo, but Lightning was too slow and was hit on the port bow, blowing it clean off. Then a second E-boat, S-55 of the 3rd S-boat flotilla (Kommandant Horst Weber), circled the ship and moved round to the starboard side. The German torpedo boat fired a second torpedo that hit beneath the funnel, destroying both boiler rooms, the pom pom and forward torpedo tubes on the upper deck. Moments later Lightning was abandoned – she had begun sinking almost immediately after the second torpedo hit, with the loss of 45 of its crew of 227. One survivor was picked up by S-158 and the remaining 180 survivors (including the captain, Commander Hugh Greaves Walters DSC) were picked up some hours later by sister ship Loyal, arriving Bone 0500 13 March. Survivors transferred to Sirius. The ship's company disbanded, transferred to other ships and shore base HMS Hannibal in Algiers. Lightning was replaced in Force Q by the Polish destroyer ORP Blyskawica. The ship's name is Polish for lightning.

== Notes ==
Additional research for the revised edition about HMS Lightning's and her company (Struck by Lightning -2019) revealed one survivor Jack Dunn -a signalman who was on the bridge the night she was torpedoed, who enjoyed his 100th birthday on 9 July 2019. This was recognised by the Sea Cadets of Doncaster SCC T.S Lightning -her adopted WW2 town.
