= HMS Laforey (G99) =

Destroyer of the Royal Navy

Coordinates: 38°54′N 14°18′E

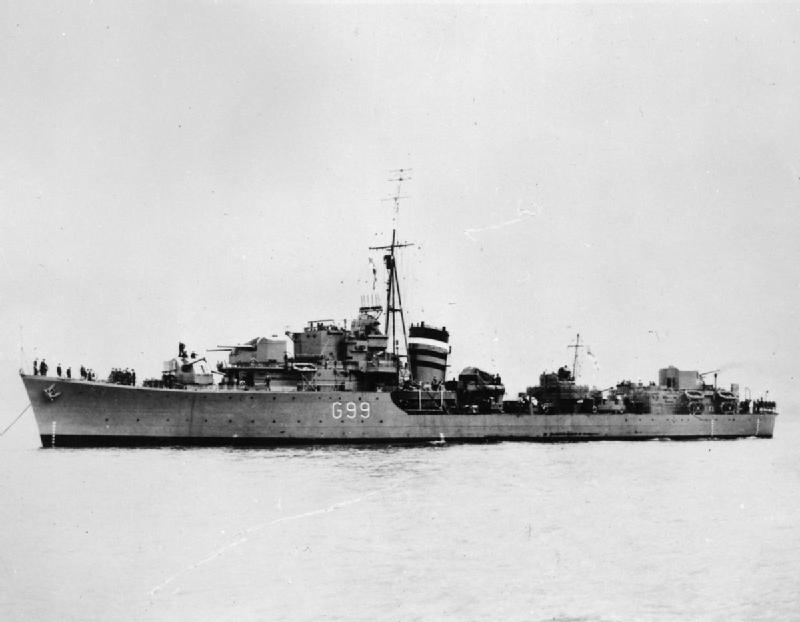
- Laforey in 1942

History

United Kingdom
- Name: HMS Laforey
- Ordered: 31 March 1938
- Builder: Yarrow Shipbuilders, Scotstoun, Glasgow
- Laid down: 1 March 1939
- Launched: 15 February 1941
- Commissioned: 26 August 1941
- Identification: Pennant number: G99
- Fate: Torpedoed and sunk on 30 March 1944
- Badge: On a Field Blue, a lion's gamb Gold holding a torch in flamed Proper.

General characteristics
- Class & type: L-class destroyer
- Displacement: 1,920 tons
- Length: 362.5 ft (110.5 m)
- Beam: 36.7 ft (11.2 m)
- Draught: 10 ft (3.0 m)
- Propulsion: Two shafts; Two geared steam turbines; Two drum type boilers; 48000 shp (35.8 MW)
- Speed: 36 kt (66.7 km/h)
- Range: 5,500 nmi (10,200 km) at 15 knots (28 km/h)
- Complement: 221
- Armament: 6 × QF 4.7 inch Mark XI gun L/50 (119 mm), twin mounts HA/LA Mk.XX; 4 × QF 2 pdr Mk.VIII L/39 (40 mm), quad mount Mk.VII; 8 × QF 0.5 in Mk.III Vickers (12.7 mm), quad mounts Mk.III; 8 (2x4) tubes for 21 inch (533 mm) torpedoes Mk.IX

HMS Laforey was an L-class destroyer of the Royal Navy. She was commissioned in and served during the Second World War, and was torpedoed and sunk by a U-boat in 1944. She had been adopted by the civil community of Northampton in November 1941.

== Construction and commissioning ==
Laforey was ordered from the yards of Yarrow Shipbuilders, Scotstoun, Glasgow on 31 March 1938 under the 1937 Naval Estimates. She was laid down on 1 March 1939 at the same time as her sister, Lance. She was launched on 15 February 1941 and commissioned on 26 August 1941. She cost £445,684, excluding items such as weapons and communications equipment supplied by the Admiralty. On commissioning she was assigned to the 19th Destroyer Flotilla of the Home Fleet as the Flotilla leader.

== Career ==
=== Mediterranean waters ===
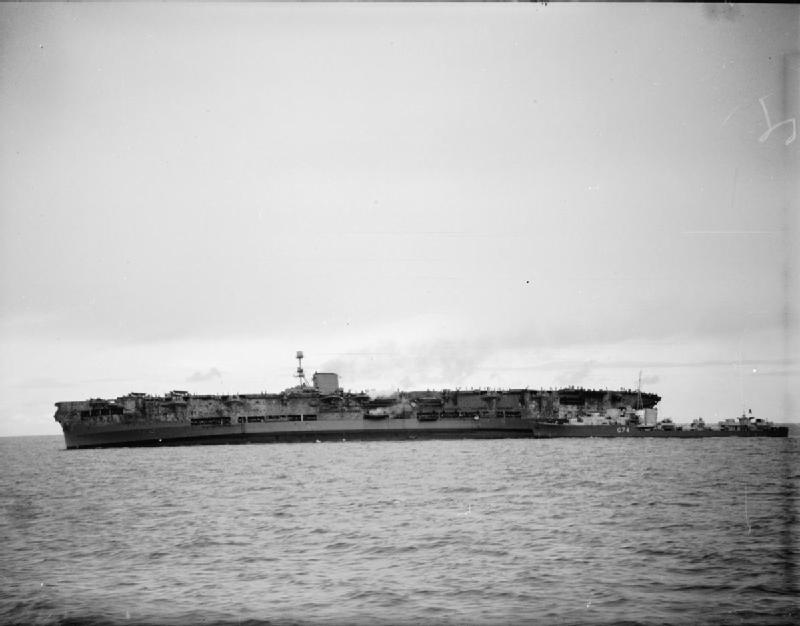
HMS Ark Royal sinking after being torpedoed by U-81. HMS Legion is alongside to take off survivors. Laforey is approaching to aid in providing water and power to the few remaining personnel on board.

Laforey was almost immediately reassigned to the Mediterranean, where she joined Force H in escorting a relief convoy to Malta as part of Operation Halberd. Despite heavy air attacks, the convoy reached Malta on 28 September, and Laforey returned to Gibraltar with the ships of Force X. In October she was permanently assigned to Force H, to carry out convoy escort duties, and fleet screening patrols. On 10 November she and the destroyers Lightning, Legion, Sikh, Zulu, Gurkha and the Dutch HNLMS Isaac Sweers were deployed to escort the cruiser Hermione, the battleship Malaya and the aircraft carriers Ark Royal and Argus during an operation to deliver aircraft to Malta. Ark Royal was torpedoed by the German submarine U-81 on 13 November as the task force returned to Gibraltar. Laforey made several unsuccessful anti-submarine attacks against suspected sonar contacts, before standing by the stricken carrier. Later in the day, Laforey ran power cables across to Ark Royal to support damage control measures. These were ultimately unsuccessful and Ark Royal sank the next day, and Laforey returned to Gibraltar.

Laforey spent January as part of anti-submarine patrols that had been instigated to intercept U-boats as they passed through the Strait of Gibraltar. On 18 January she and Hesperus intercepted and attacked U-93 with depth charges. February and March were then spent escorting convoys through the Atlantic, and screening aircraft carriers on operations to deliver aircraft to Malta. On 1 April Laforey was detached from Force H and sailed to Freetown to screen fleet units and cover convoys in the Atlantic. She arrived at Cape Town on 18 April with a military convoy, and escorted them on to Durban, arriving there on 22 April.

=== Operation Ironclad ===
On 28 April she was deployed to support Operation Ironclad, the planned Invasion of Madagascar. She carried out shore bombardments on 2 May and then, together with the destroyers Anthony and Lightning, used buoys to mark the approach channel to the landing areas at Diego Suarez on 4 May. The next day, Laforey and Lightning led landing ships into the harbour, and provided naval gunfire support. On 6 May, Laforey and her sisters Lightning and Lookout screened the battleship Ramillies during a search for Japanese warships that had been reported in the area. On 7 May Laforey covered Anthony as she landed marines and the next day she began a series of anti-submarine patrols that would last until she was detached from the operation on 27 May, when she, Lookout and Lightning sailed for Colombo to join the Eastern Fleet. She spent June with the Eastern Fleet, mostly carrying out exercises and conducting offensive sweeps, before sailing to Mombasa on 23 June.

=== Return to the Mediterranean ===
Arriving at Mombasa on 1 July, she was initially deployed in the South Atlantic to hunt commerce raiders and escort convoys. On 19 July she was detached and nominated to rejoin Force H. After sailing around Africa with a number of other capital ships, she arrived at Gibraltar in early August. She sailed on 9 August, escorting the ships comprising Operation Pedestal. On 10 August she and Lookout escorted the aircraft carrier Furious in an attempt to deliver aircraft to Malta, but were detached on 11 August to rescue survivors from the torpedoed aircraft carrier Eagle. The two ships and a rescue tug were able to rescue 927 survivors. After transferring survivors to Keppel, Laforey continued escorting the convoy. Together with Fury and Foresight, she launched an unsuccessful attack on the Italian submarine Brin later that day.

The next day, 12 August, the ships of the convoy came under heavy air attack. Laforey managed to escape damage and with a number of other ships, was detached from the convoy when it reached the Sicilian Narrows. They remained in the area until 14 August, when they sailed for Gibraltar, arriving there on 15 August. She deployed the next day to escort Furious and Charybdis in another delivery of aircraft to Malta. They returned on 18 August and on 21 August Laforey began anti-submarine operations off Gibraltar.

On 4 September she and Lookout escorted Leinster into Gibraltar. Laforey then sailed for Southampton for a refit, arriving there on 17 September. She spent October and most of November under refit, followed by a period of post-trial workup exercises with her sister Lightning at Scapa Flow. She and Lightning then escorted the troopship Duchess of Atholl out of Liverpool en route to Gibraltar, where they arrived on 20 December. On 21 December Laforey and Lightning carried out rescue operations after the torpedoing of Strathallan.

=== Force Q ===
Laforey and her flotilla were assigned to Bône as part of Force Q at the start of 1943. The ships of the force came under heavy air attack and Laforey had to sink the tanker Empire Metal on 6 January after she had been set on fire during an air raid. Laforey carried out interception patrols and convoy defence throughout February and March. On 28 April she and Tartar took part in an action against six E-boats and a submarine. They sank one E-boat by ramming it, and damaged two others. During the action, Laforey sustained damage to her forepeak.

In May she was assigned with Force Q to intercept ships attempting to evacuate German troops from Cap Bon after the defeat of the Afrika Korps. On 8 May she and Tartar captured two merchant ships, but on 9 May Laforey came under fire from shore batteries and was hit in the engine room. She sustained damage and several severe injuries to her crew, causing her to head for Malta for repairs. After being repaired, she returned to Force Q. En route, she investigated Plane Island and discovered 23 enemy soldiers, whom she promptly took prisoner. Back with Force Q, on 23 July she sank an enemy supply ship.

In June she took part in covering the allied landings at Pantelleria (Operation Corkscrew), during which she bombarded enemy positions, before sailing to Alexandria to escort convoys for the planned invasion of Sicily. After the landings on 9 July she bombarded enemy targets inland. On 15 August she embarked General Alexander, Air Marshall Coningham and Admiral Ramsey and conveyed them to Augusta. She continued to carry out bombardments and anti-submarine patrols throughout July.

On 23 July she and Eclipse engaged in a box search for the Italian submarine Ascianghi after she had torpedoed the cruiser Newfoundland. The Ascianghi fired two torpedoes at the Laforey which both missed and the Laforey and Eclipse carried out five depth charge attacks in response. The Ascianghi was forced to surface where it came under an immediate and heavy fire from the Laforey's guns and was at last sunk. A survivor was picked up who confirmed that the Italian sub had indeed fired four torpedoes at the Newfoundland two hours previously.

In August Laforey was nominated to support the invasion of mainland Italy and on 21 August, she and four other destroyers carried out an offensive sweep through the Strait of Messina. She then escorted the convoys and covered the landings. On 9 August she came under fire during a shore bombardment and was hit by five shells. One of the ship's company was killed and another two were injured, while one boiler room was put out of action. She returned to Malta for repairs to the structural damage. She was under repair until mid-October, when she returned to patrolling off the Italian coast.

On 1 November she escorted two merchant ships during their passage from Malta to Naples and on 3 November she escorted a military convoy en route to Augusta. On 5 November she came to the assistance of a US merchant ship that had run aground northeast of Augusta, and towed the vessel clear before returning to Malta to refuel. She spent the rest of the month and most of December at Malta, before returning to the Italian coast on 23 December. On 25 December she detected two E-boats on her radar and moved to intercept them, but they escaped contact and fled. Further shore bombardment operations followed.

Laforey was deployed on patrol off Corsica on 4 January, before heading into the Bay of Naples. On 6 January she sank the hulk of a liberty ship and on 7 January was despatched to the waters off Capri to search for a lifeboat. On 18 January she and a number of other warships bombarded targets around Gaeta. The ships came under air attacks and shore bombardment during these operations. After replenishing at Naples, Laforey, in company with Loyal and Jervis, joined the escort for the assault convoys of Operation Shingle, the landings at Anzio. On 22 January Laforey and Loyal led the assault force to "P" Beach landing areas. Laforey remained off the coast, to provide gunfire support and defence against air and surface attacks. On 23 January she assisted in the rescue of survivors from Janus after she had been sunk by a radio controlled bomb. On 29 January she rescued survivors from Spartan after she too was sunk by radio controlled bombs.

In February she was transferred to the 14th Destroyer Flotilla and on 18 February she bombarded Formica and was deployed with Faulknor on 25 February to intercept E-boats. Laforey was briefly detached to assist a Landing Ship, Tank that had run aground at Sabaudio, but was unable to help her. She rejoined Faulknor and together they carried out depth charge attacks on a suspected submarine contact. On 26 February they were joined by the destroyers Lamerton and Hambledon. Laforey herself came under attack from an acoustic torpedo, which exploded in her wake. Anti-submarine operations continued on 27 February when another two destroyers joined, and finished on 28 February when the ships returned to Naples. Laforey sailed to Naples with survivors from Inglefield, which had been sunk off Anzio on 15 February by a glider bomb.

== Sinking ==
Laforey returned to Naples and was deployed off Anzio on 9 March 1944 on support and patrol duties that were scheduled to last until 19 March. On 23 March she again returned to Anzio and on 24 March she was deployed for night interception and anti-submarine patrols with Grenville. On 25 March they engaged a number of E-boats after picking them up on their radar. Laforey then sailed to Naples. She deployed for another patrol off the west coast of Italy on 28 March and on 29 March she carried out a hunt for U-223 north of Palermo, in company with the destroyers Tumult, Tuscan, Urchin, Hambledon and Blencathra. U-223 had been detected by Ulster during a routine sweep. The search lasted until 30 March, when after sustaining several hours of depth charge attacks, U-223 surfaced, and was then attacked by the destroyers with gunfire at a range of 1,500 yards (1,400 m). U-223 was able to fire three torpedoes which struck Laforey. She sank quickly, resulting in the loss of most of her company, including her captain. There were only 65 survivors out of the 247 on board. One survivor was Petty Officer Ronald Sired, who gives an account of life on board and the sinking in "Enemy Engaged", published in 1957. U-223 was sunk soon afterwards, and the survivors from Laforey and U-223 were picked up by Blencathra, Hambledon and Tumult.
