= Laforey-class destroyer =

Laforey-class destroyer may refer to:

- Laforey-class destroyer (1913), a class of 22 Royal Navy destroyers launched from 1913 to 1915
- L and M-class destroyer or Laforey class, a class of 16 Royal Navy destroyers launched from 1939 to 1941
