= G44 =

G44, G-44 or G.44 may refer to:

- Grumman Widgeon, also known as the Grumman G44, is a twin-engine, amphibious commercial aircraft
- HMS Martin (G44), a United Kingdom Royal navy destroyer which saw service during World War II
- G-44 Qeqertarsuaq, a football club based in Greenland
- Glock 44, a model of handgun
