= Convoy JW 57 =

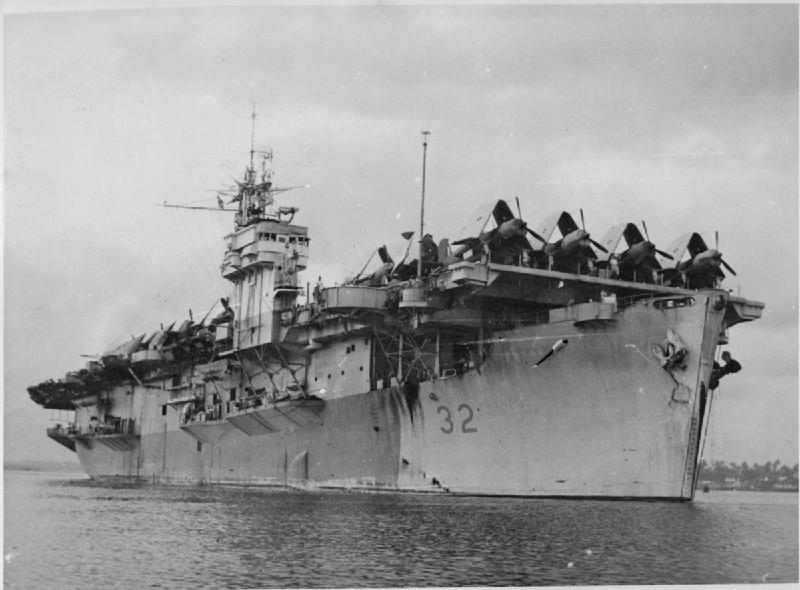
HMS Chaser

Convoy JW 57 was an Arctic convoy sent from Great Britain by the Western Allies to aid the Soviet Union during World War II. It sailed in February 1944, reaching the Soviet northern ports at the end of the month. All ships arrived safely. For several days JW 57 was attacked by a German U-boat force; one escort vessel was sunk, and two U-boats were destroyed in counter-measures, during this operation.

== Ships ==
The convoy consisted of 45 merchant ships which departed from Loch Ewe on 20 February 1944. Close escort was provided by a force led by Cdr IJ Tyson in the destroyer Keppel, with three other destroyers and four corvettes. The force was supported by an Ocean escort of 14 destroyers led by V.Adm IG Glennie in the cruiser Black Prince, and the escort carrier Chaser with her escort of two destroyers and two frigates. The convoy was also accompanied initially by a local escort group from Britain, and joined later by a local escort group from Murmansk. There was no capital ship force providing distant cover, as Germany's only remaining heavy unit in the Arctic, Tirpitz, was still non-operational following the attack by British X-craft (Operation Source), but a cruiser cover force comprising Berwick and Jamaica followed the convoy, to guard against attack by smaller surface units.

JW 57 was opposed by a U-boat force of 14 boats, arranged in two patrol lines code-named Werewolf (10 boats) and Hartmut (4 boats).

== Action ==
JW 57 departed Loch Ewe on 20 February 1944, accompanied by its local escort, the minesweeper Rattlesnake and three others, with two corvettes. The close escort joined the same day.

On 22 February they were met by the Ocean escort, and by Chaser and her group, while the local escort returned.

On 23 February the convoy was sighted by German reconnaissance aircraft, which were attacked by Chaser's Martlets.

On 24 February the U-boats gained contact, but were unsuccessful in their attacks, while U-713 was sunk in a counter-attack by Keppel, assisted by a Swordfish from Chaser.

On 25 February the U-boats again attacked, and on this day U-990 torpedoed the destroyer Mahratta. She quickly sank, with the loss of most of her crew; there were 17 survivors. Also on 25 February a Catalina from Sullom Voe attacked and destroyed U-601.

No further losses and JW 57 reached Kola safely on 28 February.

== Conclusion ==
All 45 ships arrived safely, despite determined U-boat opposition, and two U-boats had been destroyed. However the loss of Mahratta was keenly felt among men of the escort force, taking the edge off the victory.
