= G55 =

G55 may refer to

- Fiat G.55 Centauro, a World War II fighter aircraft
- G55 Erenhot–Guangzhou Expressway in China
- HMS Lightning (G55), a World War II destroyer of the Royal Navy
- Ginetta G55, a British racing car.
- Mercedes G55
