= L and M-class destroyer =

Class of destroyers for Britain

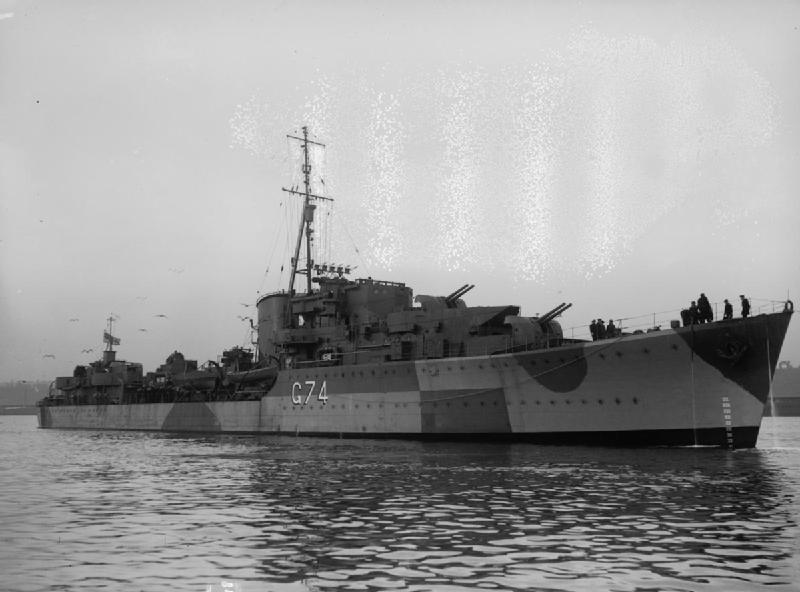
- HMS Legion with her Type 285 radar aerials visible on her HA DCT

Class overview
- Operators: Royal Navy; Polish Navy; Turkish Navy
- Preceded by: J, K and N class
- Succeeded by: O and P class
- Subclasses: L, M
- Built: 1938–42
- Completed: 16
- Lost: 9
- Scrapped: 7

General characteristics as completed
- Type: Destroyer
- Displacement: 1,920 long tons (1,951 t) (standard); 2,660 long tons (2,703 t) (deep)
- Length: 362 ft 3 in (110.4 m) o/a
- Beam: 37 ft (11.3 m)
- Draught: 10 ft (3.0 m)
- Installed power: 48,000 shp (36,000 kW)
- Propulsion: 2 × shafts; 2 × Parsons geared steam turbines; 2 × Admiralty 3-drum boilers
- Speed: 36 knots (67 km/h; 41 mph)
- Range: 5,500 nmi (10,200 km; 6,300 mi) at 15 knots (28 km/h; 17 mph)
- Complement: 190
- Sensors & processing systems: ASDIC; Type 285 anti-aircraft (AA) radar; Type 286M air warning radar
- Armament: 3 × 2 - QF 4.7-inch Mk XI dual purpose guns Or; 4 × 2 - QF 4-inch Mk XVI dual purpose guns; 1 × 1 - QF 4-inch Mk V anti-aircraft gun; 1 × 4 - QF 2-pounder Mk VIII anti-aircraft guns; 2 × 4 - QF .5-inch Vickers Mk III anti-aircraft machine guns; 2 × 4 - 21-inch (533 mm) torpedo tubes; 42 × Depth charges, 2 rails and 2 throwers

The L and M class was a class of sixteen destroyers which served in the British Royal Navy during World War II. The ships of the class were launched between 1939 and 1942.

The L class (also known as the Laforeys) were approved under the 1937 Naval Estimates. Four of these ships (Lance, Lively, Legion and Larne) were built with 4-inch (102 mm) armament instead of 4.7 inch. Six of the eight were war losses, with the surviving pair being broken up in 1948.

The M Class were built under the 1939 Naval Estimates. They served in the Home Fleet until 1944 and then went to the Mediterranean. Three were wartime losses; of the five survivors, the Musketeer was broken up in 1955 and the other four sold to Turkey in 1958.

== Design details ==
The armament of the class was subject of considerable debate, as the proponents of heavier anti-aircraft armaments for such vessels were at last beginning to be listened to by the Admiralty. This came mainly as a result of the lessons learned during the Spanish Civil War – i.e., military aircraft were now sufficiently advanced to pose a major threat to land and sea targets.

The ships of the L and M class had single funnels, like the previous J class, a tripod foremast and a short mainmast just aft of amidships. One feature of note was the bridge design. From the I class to the Weapon class, all Royal Navy destroyers shared a distinctive wedge-shaped face to the bridge, incorporating a bulletproof wheelhouse, raised for the helmsman to see over the guns. The increased height of the new gunhouses of the L class meant that the wheelhouse was raised further and the sloped roof of the wheelhouse (to direct the airflow over the compass platform) was almost flat. This feature was unique to the Ls and Ms.

The class comprised a leader and seven destroyers. Each ship was to mount six 4.7-inch (120 mm) guns and eight torpedo tubes. Close range armament had still to be decided, with the expected time of delivery being a crucial factor. They were the first British destroyers to have their guns in fully enclosed mountings. They also continued the practice (first introduced in the Js) of making the leader Laforey almost indistinguishable from the rest of the class, having only more extensive cabin accommodation and better radio (wireless telegraph, W/T) equipment.

=== Main armament ===
The ships were to have six QF Mark XI 4.7-inch (120 mm) guns in Mark XX twin mountings in 'A', 'B', and 'X' positions. The 'X' mount gave an estimated arc of fire of 320 degrees at low elevations and 360 degrees at elevations above around 20 degrees. The Mark XI gun was a big improvement on the previous version in that it threw a 62 lb (28 kg) shell (compared to the 50 lb (23 kg) shell in the preceding J class). The Mark XX mount was fully enclosed and supposedly weatherproof; in service, crews found otherwise. It also allowed the guns to be elevated independently. The Mark XX was not technically a turret, as the ammunition feed system was distinct from the weapon mounting, and did not train with the revolving mass. This meant that ammunition supply when the guns were at the limit of training was somewhat difficult. This also meant that the ammunition hoists had to be located between the guns just as in the USN 5" guns. The axes of the guns were very widely spaced, a feature instantly obvious with the Mark XX mounting.

The Mark XX mounting permitted an increased elevation to 50 degrees (compared to 40 for previous marks) but this still limited the engagement time against enemy aircraft, although medium calibre guns posed little threat to dive bombers prior to the use of radar proximity fuzed ammunition. The Imperial Japanese Navy had already introduced a 5-inch (127 mm) gun with 70-degree elevation into service which had very poor performance as an anti-aircraft weapon, while the United States Navy's 5"/38 cal Mark 32 mount could elevate to 85 degrees. The 4.5-inch (114 mm) guns fitted to HMS Ark Royal were already in service and capable of elevations of 80 degrees, although the mountings were not suitable for a destroyer-sized ship. Coupled with the lack of powered elevation, the Mark XX mounting was compromised in its chosen anti-aircraft role, although it compared favourably with similar Axis weapons.

Another development regarding the main armament was the adoption of a combined high-angle/low-angle director tower, the HA/LA Mk.IV (TP). This was never entirely satisfactory in the HA mode, and was at least a ton overweight. It was later reworked, somewhat unsuccessfully again, as the Mk.I "K tower" of the Z class. These ships used the Fuze Keeping Clock HA Fire Control Computer. Despite its problems, the L and M class' director tower and its Type 285 radar provided better high-angle fire control than any similar Axis destroyer, the vast majority of which did not have any high-angle fire control system, much less a specialised AA fire control radar.

As originally ordered, the class had no close-range armament as the various departments could not agree on what to fit. Arguments raged as to the effectiveness of mounting one or two four-barrelled 2-pounder "pom poms", one pom-pom and one of the 0.661-inch (16.8 mm) multiple machine guns then in development, one pom-pom and the traditional 0.5-inch (12.7 mm) Vickers machine gun. The argument was exacerbated by the manufacturing schedules (a second pom-pom per ship would not be available until 1942), the poor performance of the development models of the 0.661 and a number of younger officers (led by Lord Louis Mountbatten) dissatisfied with anti-aircraft weaponry. Eventually, development of the 0.661 was dropped as it clearly would not be available quickly enough and this simplified the arguments somewhat.

The outbreak of war focused minds. Apart from the AA armament issue concerns started to be raised about progress generally. By February 1940 the two factors led to a proposal to change the design of four of the 'L's and fit a main armament of 4-inch (102 mm) Mark XVI* guns in Mark XIX High Angle/Low Angle (HA/LA) twin mounts as used as secondary armament in the Southampton-class cruisers already in service and main armament in the Black Swan class of sloops under construction. Associated changes were provision of two quadruple 0.5-inch (12.7 mm) machine guns. All ships of this class except Lightning and Laforey carried a four-barrel 2-pounder pom-pom.

The lessons of the Norwegian campaign and the Battle of Dunkirk drove home the need for this change and it was agreed in July 1940 that there were also to be four of the twin mounts instead of the originally proposed three. The fourth was to be at the forward end of the after superstructure which cut down on the fire arcs of both mounts but ensured the fourth would still be available for use in heavy weather. Not all senior officers were in favour and some said that it would mean the ships could not fight their foreign equivalents. Experience in the Mediterranean, especially that of Force K which contained two of the 4-inch (102 mm) 'L's, showed that the loss of gun power against surface targets was balanced against a higher rate of fire.

Review of AA armament continued and in October a decision was taken to remove the after bank of torpedo tubes and fit a 4-inch (102 mm) HA gun instead and that is how the 4.7-inch (120 mm) gunned ships eventually went to sea, although some surviving ships, including Matchless and Marne, had the after tubes replaced later in the war.

== Proposed conversion ==
In the early 1950s, it was proposed to convert the five remaining ships of the M class, together with seven War Emergency Programme destroyers to Type 62 Air Direction Frigates. The conversion would have involved replacement of the ships' armament and sensors. The initial proposal would have armed the ships with a twin 4-inch gun mount, a twin 40 mm Bofors gun and a Squid anti-submarine mortar. Type 982 and 983 air direction radars would be fitted, as would Type 162 and 166 sonars. In March 1952, the programme was reduced, as the War Emergency Destroyers were too small to accommodate the heavy radars. Later that year, it was decided to substitute a US twin 3"/50 caliber gun mount for the 4-inch guns. The project was finally abandoned in May 1954, partly owing to the condition of the ships and poor shock-resistance.

== Ships ==
=== L class ===
The L class (also known as the Laforeys) were approved under the 1937 Naval Estimates. Four of these ships (Lance, Lively, Legion and Larne) were built with 4-inch (102 mm) armament. Six of the eight were war losses, with the surviving pair being broken up in 1948.

Construction data
Ship	Builder	Laid down	Launched	Commissioned	Fate
Laforey (flotilla leader)	Yarrow & Company, Scotstoun	1 March 1939	15 February 1941	26 August 1941	Sunk, 30 March 1944
Lance	Yarrow & Company, Scotstoun	1 March 1939	28 November 1940	13 May 1941	Sunk, 9 April 1942
Gurkha (ex-Larne)	Cammell Laird & Company, Birkenhead	18 October 1938	28 July 1940	18 February 1941	Sunk, 17 January 1942
Lively	Cammell Laird & Company, Birkenhead	20 December 1938	28 January 1941	20 July 1941	Sunk, 11 May 1942
Legion	Hawthorn Leslie & Company, Hebburn	1 November 1938	26 December 1939	19 December 1940	Sunk, 26 March 1942
Lightning	Hawthorn Leslie & Company, Hebburn	15 November 1938	22 April 1940	28 May 1941	Sunk, 12 March 1943
Lookout	Scotts Shipbuilding & Engineering Company, Greenock	23 November 1938	4 November 1940	30 January 1942	Broken up, 1948
Loyal	Scotts Shipbuilding & Engineering Company, Greenock	23 November 1938	8 October 1941	31 October 1942	Broken up, 1948

=== M class ===
The M Class were built under the 1939 Naval Estimates. They served in the Home Fleet until 1944 and then went to the Mediterranean. Three were wartime losses; of the five survivors, the Musketeer was broken up in 1955 and the other four sold to Turkey in 1958.

Construction data
Ship	Builder	Laid down	Launched	Commissioned	Fate
Milne	Scotts Shipbuilding & Engineering Company, Greenock	24 January 1940	30 December 1941	6 August 1942	Transferred to Turkey, 1959, as Alp Arslan
Mahratta (ex-Marksman)	Scotts Shipbuilding & Engineering Company, Greenock	7 July 1939	28 July 1942	8 April 1943	Sunk by the German submarine U-990, 25 February 1944
Musketeer	Fairfield Shipbuilding & Engineering Company, Govan	7 December 1939	2 December 1941	5 December 1942	Broken up, 6 December 1955
Myrmidon	Fairfield Shipbuilding & Engineering Company, Govan	7 December 1939	2 March 1942	5 December 1942	Loaned to the Polish Navy and renamed ORP Orkan. Sunk by submarine, 8 October 1943
Matchless	Alexander Stephen & Sons, Linthouse	14 September 1940	4 September 1941	26 February 1942	Transferred to Turkey, 1959, as Kilicali Pasha
Meteor	Alexander Stephen & Sons, Linthouse	14 September 1940	3 November 1941	12 August 1942	Transferred to Turkey, 1959, as Piyale Pasha
Marne	Vickers-Armstrongs, Walker	23 October 1939	30 October 1940	2 December 1941	Transferred to Turkey, 1959, as Maresal Fevzi Cakmak
Martin	Vickers-Armstrongs, Walker	23 October 1939	12 December 1940	4 August 1942	Sunk by submarine, 10 November 1942
