= HMS Marne (G35) =

Destroyer of the Royal Navy

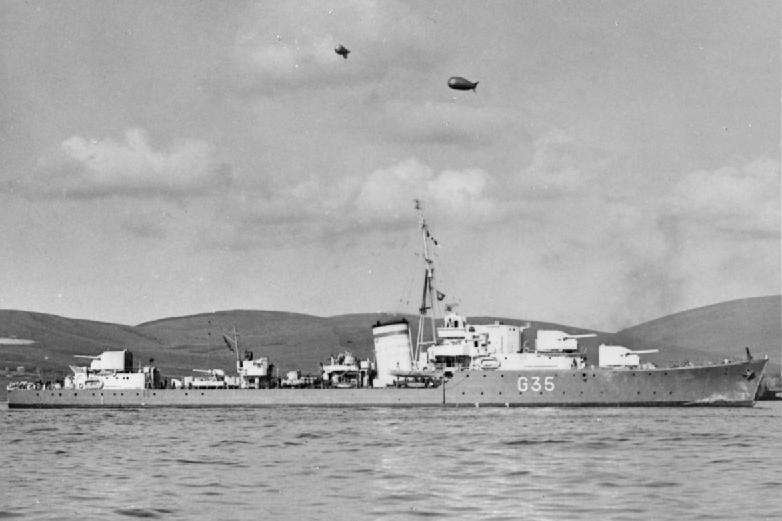
- Marne in May 1942

History

United Kingdom
- Name: HMS Marne
- Builder: Vickers-Armstrongs, Newcastle upon Tyne
- Laid down: 23 October 1939
- Launched: 30 October 1940
- Commissioned: 2 December 1941
- Fate: Sold to the Turkish Navy on 26 March 1959, renamed Mareşal Fevzi Çakmak

Turkey
- Name: Mareşal Fevzi Çakmak
- Namesake: Fevzi Çakmak
- Acquired: 29 June 1959
- Fate: Discarded 1970

General characteristics (as built)
- Class & type: M-class destroyer
- Displacement: 1,920 long tons (1,950 t) (standard); 2,725 long tons (2,769 t) (deep load)
- Length: 362 ft 3 in (110.4 m) (o/a)
- Beam: 37 ft (11.3 m)
- Draught: 14 ft (4.3 m)
- Installed power: 48,000 shp (36,000 kW); 2 × Admiralty 3-drum boilers
- Propulsion: 2 × shafts; 2 × geared steam turbines
- Speed: 36 knots (67 km/h; 41 mph)
- Range: 5,500 nmi (10,200 km; 6,300 mi) at 15 knots (28 km/h; 17 mph)
- Complement: 190
- Sensors & processing systems: ASDIC; Type 285 gunnery radar; Type 290 air warning radar
- Armament: 3 × twin 4.7 in (120 mm) Mk XI dual-purpose guns; 1 × single QF 4 in (102 mm) Mk V anti-aircraft gun; 1 × quadruple QF 2-pdr (40 mm) Mk VIII AA guns; 2 × single Oerlikon 20 mm (0.8 in) AA guns; 2 × quadruple, 2 × twin 0.5 in (12.7 mm) Vickers Mark III anti-aircraft machineguns; 1 × quadruple 21 in (533 mm) torpedo tubes; 42 × depth charges, 2 × racks, 2 × throwers

HMS Marne was an M-class destroyer of the Royal Navy commissioned on 2 December 1941. She was built by Vickers-Armstrongs at High Walker Yard, Newcastle-upon-Tyne, England, and saw service in the Atlantic theatre of World War II.

== Service history ==
=== Royal Navy ===
Marne was part of Convoy PQ 15 and along with Martin, helped to rescue 169 survivors from Punjabi after she was sunk in a collision with the battleship King George V.

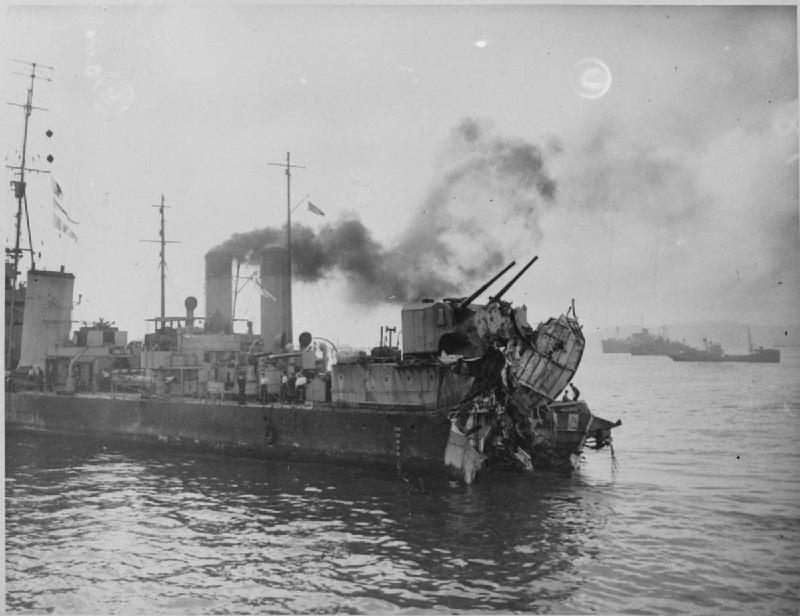
Marne being towed into Gibraltar.

The destroyer depot ships Hecla and Vindictive with the escort ships Venomous and Marne, were part of a convoy as part of Operation Torch west of Gibraltar. On 12 November 1942 the German submarine U-515 torpedoed and sunk Hecla, and minutes later fired two more torpedoes and badly damaged Marne, blowing off her stern. Michael Flanders, who was to become a famous actor and writer, was serving on board as part of the Royal Navy Volunteer Reserve

=== Turkish Navy ===
Following the Second World War Marne, along with three other ships of the same class, was transferred to the Turkish Navy as part of an agreement signed at Ankara on 16 August 1957. They underwent a refit which involved the removal of the after set of torpedo tubes and some secondary armament. They received a new deckhouse and Squid anti-submarine weapons system. On 29 June 1959 they were handed over at Portsmouth. Marne was renamed Mareşal Fevzi Çakmak, after Fevzi Çakmak (1876–1950), the Turkish Mareşal (Field Marshal) and Chief of Staff of the Armed Forces.

The ship remained in service with the Turkish Navy until 1970, when she was discarded and scrapped.
