= HMS Loyal (G15) =

Destroyer of the Royal Navy

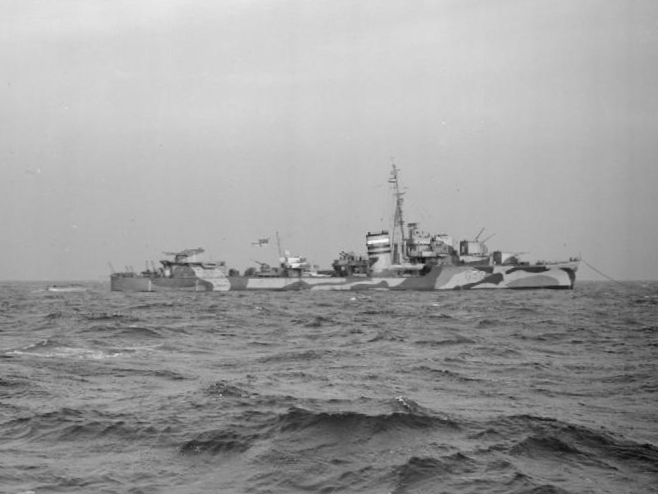
- Side view of her sister HMS Lookout

History

United Kingdom
- Name: HMS Loyal
- Ordered: 31 March 1938
- Builder: Scotts Shipbuilding and Engineering Company, Greenock, Scotland
- Laid down: 23 November 1938
- Launched: 8 October 1940
- Completed: 31 October 1942
- Identification: Pennant number G15
- Fate: Struck a mine 12 October 1944, constructive total loss; Sold for scrap, 1948

General characteristics as completed
- Class & type: L-class destroyer
- Displacement: 1,920 long tons (1,951 t) (standard); 2,660 long tons (2,703 t) (deep)
- Length: 362 ft 3 in (110.4 m) o/a
- Beam: 37 ft (11.3 m)
- Draught: 13 ft 9 in (4.2 m)
- Installed power: 48,000 shp (36,000 kW); 2 × Admiralty 3-drum boilers
- Propulsion: 2 × shafts; 2 × Parsons geared steam turbines
- Speed: 36 knots (67 km/h; 41 mph)
- Range: 5,500 nmi (10,200 km; 6,300 mi) at 15 knots (28 km/h; 17 mph)
- Complement: 190
- Sensors & processing systems: ASDIC; Type 285 anti-aircraft (AA) radar; Type 286M air warning radar
- Armament: 3 × twin 4.7 in (120 mm) Mark XI dual-purpose guns; 1 × quadruple QF 2 pdr (40 mm) Mk VIII AA guns; 6 × single Oerlikon 20 mm cannon; 2 × quadruple 21 in (533 mm) torpedo tubes; 45 × depth charges

HMS Loyal was a L-class destroyer built for the Royal Navy in the late 1930s, although she was not completed until after World War II had begun.

== Description ==
The L-class destroyers were designed as enlarged and improved versions of the preceding J class equipped with dual-purpose guns. They displaced 1,920 long tons (1,951 t) at standard load and 2,675 long tons (2,718 t) at deep load. The ships had an overall length of 362 feet 3 inches (110.4 m), a beam of 37 feet (11.3 m) and a deep draught of 13 feet 9 inches (4.2 m). They were powered by Parsons geared steam turbines, each driving one propeller shaft, using steam for was provided by two Admiralty three-drum boilers. The turbines developed a total of 48,000 shaft horsepower (36,000 kW) and gave a maximum speed of 36 knots (67 km/h; 41 mph). The ships carried a maximum of 567 long tons (576 t) of fuel oil that gave them a range of 5,500 nautical miles (10,200 km; 6,300 mi) at 15 knots (28 km/h; 17 mph). The L class' complement was 190 officers and ratings.

The ships mounted six 4.7-inch (120 mm) Mark XI guns in twin-gun mounts, two superfiring in front of the bridge and one aft of the superstructure. Their light anti-aircraft suite was composed of one quadruple mount for 2-pounder "pom-pom" guns and six single Oerlikon 20 mm cannon. Later in the war, twin Oerlikon mounts replaced the singles. The L-class ships were fitted with two above-water quadruple mounts for 21-inch (533 mm) torpedoes. The ships were equipped with 45 depth charges.

== Construction and career ==
Loyal was laid down on 23 November 1938 by Scotts Shipbuilding and Engineering Company at their Greenock shipyard, launched on 8 October 1941 and completed on 31 October 1942. She struck a mine on 12 October 1944 and was declared a constructive total loss.
