= HMS Martin (G44) =

Destroyer of the Royal Navy

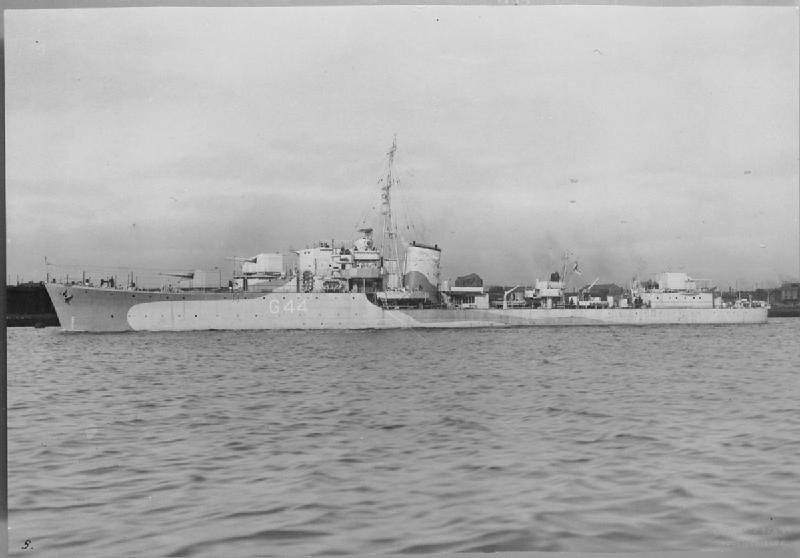
- Martin

History

United Kingdom
- Name: HMS Martin
- Builder: Vickers-Armstrongs, Newcastle upon Tyne
- Laid down: 23 October 1939
- Launched: 12 December 1940
- Fate: Sunk, 10 November 1942

General characteristics (as built)
- Class & type: M-class destroyer
- Displacement: 1,920 long tons (1,950 t) (standard); 2,725 long tons (2,769 t) (deep load)
- Length: 362 ft 3 in (110.4 m) (o/a)
- Beam: 37 ft (11.3 m)
- Draught: 14 ft (4.3 m)
- Installed power: 48,000 shp (36,000 kW); 2 × Admiralty 3-drum boilers
- Propulsion: 2 × shafts; 2 × geared steam turbines
- Speed: 36 knots (67 km/h; 41 mph)
- Range: 5,500 nmi (10,200 km; 6,300 mi) at 15 knots (28 km/h; 17 mph)
- Complement: 190
- Sensors & processing systems: ASDIC; Type 285 gunnery radar; Type 290 air warning radar
- Armament: 3 × twin 4.7 in (120 mm) Mk XI dual-purpose guns; 1 × single QF 4 in (102 mm) Mk V anti-aircraft gun; 1 × quadruple QF 2-pdr (40 mm) Mk VIII AA guns; 2 × single Oerlikon 20 mm (0.8 in) AA guns; 2 × quadruple, 2 × twin 0.5 in (12.7 mm) Vickers Mark III anti-aircraft machineguns; 1 × quadruple 21 in (533 mm) torpedo tubes; 42 × depth charges, 2 × racks, 2 × throwers

HMS Martin was an M-class destroyer of the Royal Navy, launched at the Tyneside yard of Vickers-Armstrongs on 12 December 1940. She had a busy but brief wartime career, being sunk by the German submarine U-431 on 10 November 1942 off Algiers.

== Service history ==
=== Convoy PQ 17 ===
Martin was an escort for the Home Fleet during the ill-fated Convoy PQ 17, sailing from Scapa on 30 June and cruising off Bear Island, arriving back at Scapa Flow on 11 July. Martin left Scapa Flow on 15 July for Seidisfjord and left there on 20 July in company with Marne, Middleton and Blankney for Archangel loaded with replenishments for the escorts and merchant ships. They arrived at Kola Inlet on 24 July and Archangel some days later. Martin sailed from Archangel on 14 August and joined the US cruiser USS Tuscaloosa. After calling at Kola Inlet, whence she sailed on 24 August in company with Marne and Onslaught, Martin participated in sinking of the German minelayer Ulm on 25 July and taking 54 prisoners-of-war. She arrived at Scapa Flow on 30 August, having survived a minor collision with Vidette on that day.

=== Convoy PQ18 ===
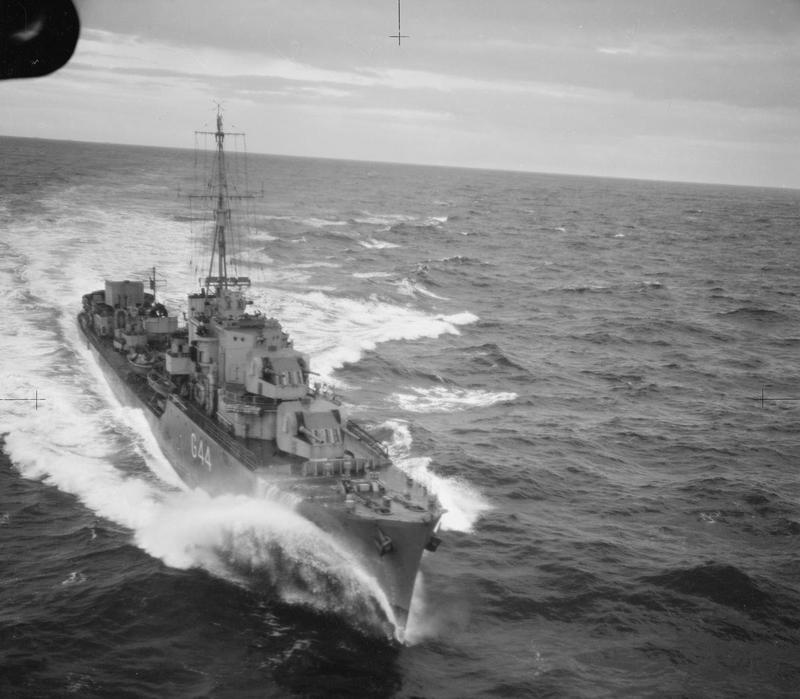
HMS Martin

Martin sailed from Scapa Flow on 4 September to join the escorts of convoy PQ 18. In the convoy she was part of Force "B", and joined the convoy with the cruiser Scylla, and the escort aircraft carrier Avenger southwest of Jan Meyen Island on 9 September. PQ 18 was heavily attacked by aircraft and lost ten ships, which were sunk, by torpedo bomber attacks and two others by U-boat, out of an original convoy of 40 ships. On 16 September, Martin with Scylla and the rest of the destroyers transferred to the westbound convoy, QP 14. This convoy escaped air attack, but lost three ships out of fifteen to U-boats, which in addition sank two of the escort and a fleet oiler. Martin arrived back at Scapa Flow on 27 September with survivors from four merchant ships.

=== Loss ===
Martin was allocated to the escort group for Force "H" in Operation “Torch”, the landings in North Africa. She sailed from Scapa Flow on 30 October as part of the escort for Force "H", and after fuelling at Gibraltar on 5 November re-joined Force "H"- the covering force to the landings at Algiers and Oran, on 8 November. The task of Force "H" was to guard against action by the Italian fleet, during the landings. Martin was torpedoed by U-431 under command of Wilhelm Dommes on the morning of 10 November as a result of which she blew up and sank in position 37°53′N 003°57′E. The only survivors were five officers and 59 ratings picked up by the destroyer Quentin.
