= HMS Milne (G14) =

British and Turkish M-class destroyer

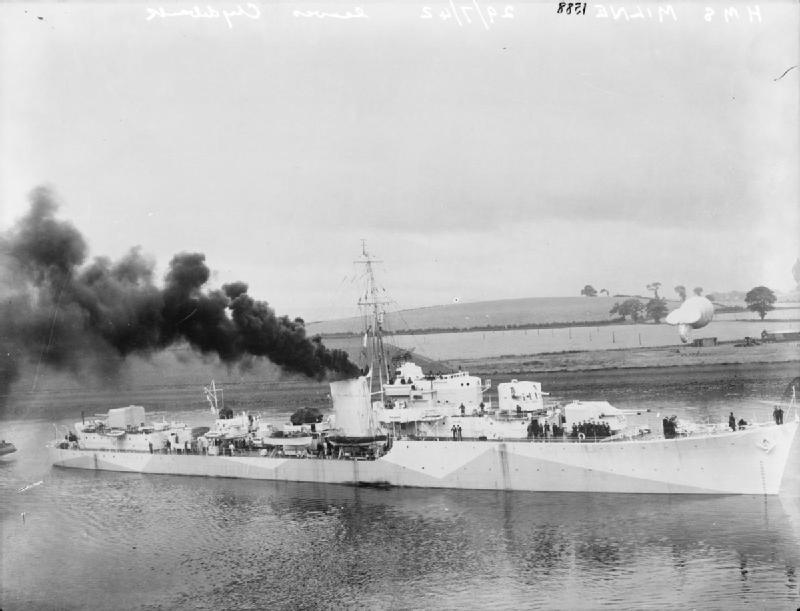
- HMS Milne on completion, 1942

History

United Kingdom
- Name: HMS Milne
- Builder: Scotts, Greenock
- Laid down: 24 January 1940
- Launched: 30 December 1941
- Commissioned: 6 August 1942
- Honours and awards: Arctic (1943–44); North Africa (1942–43)
- Fate: Sold to Turkish Navy on 27 April 1959, renamed Alp Arslan

Turkey
- Name: Alp Arslan
- Acquired: 29 June 1959
- Fate: Discarded 1970

General characteristics (as built)
- Class & type: M-class destroyer
- Displacement: 1,935 long tons (1,966 t) (standard); 2,750 long tons (2,790 t) (deep load)
- Length: 362 ft 3 in (110.4 m) (o/a)
- Beam: 37 ft (11.3 m)
- Draught: 14 ft (4.3 m)
- Installed power: 48,000 shp (36,000 kW); 2 × Admiralty 3-drum boilers
- Propulsion: 2 × shafts; 2 × geared steam turbines
- Speed: 36 knots (67 km/h; 41 mph)
- Range: 5,500 nmi (10,200 km; 6,300 mi) at 15 knots (28 km/h; 17 mph)
- Complement: 224
- Sensors & processing systems: ASDIC; Type 285 gunnery radar; Type 290 air warning radar
- Armament: 3 × twin 4.7 in (120 mm) Mk XI dual-purpose guns; 1 × single QF 4 in (102 mm) Mk V anti-aircraft gun; 1 × quadruple QF 2-pdr (40 mm) Mk VIII AA guns; 2 × single Oerlikon 20 mm (0.8 in) AA guns; 2 × quadruple, 2 × twin 0.5 in (12.7 mm) Vickers Mark III anti-aircraft machineguns; 1 × quadruple 21 in (533 mm) torpedo tubes; 42 × depth charges, 2 × racks, 2 × throwers

HMS Milne was a M-class destroyer of the Royal Navy which served during World War II. She was equipped as a flotilla leader.

== Description ==
The M-class destroyers were repeats of the preceding L class. Milne, being the flotilla leader, was slightly larger than her sister ships. She displaced 1,935 long tons (1,966 t) at standard load and 2,750 long tons (2,790 t) at deep load. The ships had an overall length of 362 feet 3 inches (110.4 m), a beam of 37 feet (11.3 m) and a deep draught of 14 feet (4.3 m). They were powered by Parsons geared steam turbines, each driving one propeller shaft, using steam provided by two Admiralty three-drum boilers. The turbines developed a total of 48,000 shaft horsepower (36,000 kW) and gave a maximum speed of 36 knots (67 km/h; 41 mph). The ships carried a maximum of 567 long tons (576 t) of fuel oil that gave them a range of 5,500 nautical miles (10,200 km; 6,300 mi) at 15 knots (28 km/h; 17 mph). The ship's complement was 224 officers and ratings.

The ships mounted six 4.7-inch (120 mm) Mark XI guns in twin-gun mounts, two superfiring in front of the bridge and one aft of the superstructure. The aft torpedo tubes were replaced by a single QF 4-inch Mk V anti-aircraft gun. Their light anti-aircraft suite was composed of one quadruple mount for 2-pounder "pom-pom" guns, two single Oerlikon 20 mm cannon and two quadruple and two twin mounts for 0.5 inch Vickers Mark III anti-aircraft machinegun. Later in the war, single Oerlikons replaced the .50-calibre machineguns and, still later, twin Oerlikon mounts replaced four of the singles. The M-class ships completed with only one above-water quadruple mount for 21-inch (533 mm) torpedoes, but the aft mount was later replaced and the 4-inch AA gun removed. The ships were equipped with two depth charge throwers, two racks and 42 depth charges.

== Construction and career ==
Milne was laid down on 24 January 1940 by Scotts at their Greenock shipyard and launched 30 December 1941. Because of bomb damage to the shipyard, she had to be towed to John Brown & Company to be completed on 6 August 1942. During the war she saw service in the Mediterranean and Arctic theatres.

== Postwar service ==
Following the Second World War Milne, along with three other ships of the same class, was transferred to the Turkish Navy as part of an agreement signed at Ankara on 16 August 1957. They underwent a refit which involved the removal of the after set of torpedo tubes and some secondary armament. They received a new deckhouse and Squid anti-submarine weapons system. On 29 June 1959 they were handed over at Portsmouth. Milne was renamed Alp Arslan.
