= German submarine U-378 =

German World War II submarine

History

Nazi Germany
- Name: U-378
- Ordered: 16 October 1939
- Builder: Howaldtswerke, Kiel
- Yard number: 9
- Laid down: 3 May 1940
- Launched: 13 September 1941
- Commissioned: 30 October 1941
- Fate: Sunk on 20 October 1943

General characteristics
- Class & type: Type VIIC submarine
- Displacement: 769 tonnes (757 long tons) surfaced; 871 t (857 long tons) submerged
- Length: 67.10 m (220 ft 2 in) o/a; 50.50 m (165 ft 8 in) pressure hull
- Beam: 6.20 m (20 ft 4 in) o/a; 4.70 m (15 ft 5 in) pressure hull
- Height: 9.60 m (31 ft 6 in)
- Draught: 4.74 m (15 ft 7 in)
- Installed power: 2,800–3,200 PS (2,100–2,400 kW; 2,800–3,200 bhp) (diesels); 750 PS (550 kW; 740 shp) (electric)
- Propulsion: 2 shafts; 2 × diesel engines; 2 × electric motors
- Speed: 17.7 knots (32.8 km/h; 20.4 mph) surfaced; 7.6 knots (14.1 km/h; 8.7 mph) submerged
- Range: 8,500 nmi (15,700 km; 9,800 mi) at 10 knots (19 km/h; 12 mph) surfaced; 80 nmi (150 km; 92 mi) at 4 knots (7.4 km/h; 4.6 mph) submerged
- Test depth: 230 m (750 ft); Crush depth: 250–295 m (820–968 ft)
- Complement: 4 officers, 40–56 enlisted
- Armament: 5 × 53.3 cm (21 in) torpedo tubes (four bow, one stern); 14 × torpedoes; 1 × 8.8 cm (3.46 in) deck gun (220 rounds); 1 x 2 cm (0.79 in) C/30 AA gun

Service record
- Part of: 8th U-boat Flotilla; 30 October 1941 – 28 February 1942; 3rd U-boat Flotilla; 1 March – 30 June 1942; 11th U-boat Flotilla; 1 July 1942 – 30 April 1943; 3rd U-boat Flotilla; 1 May – 20 October 1943
- Identification codes: M 34 668
- Commanders: Kptlt. Alfred Hoschatt; 30 October 1941 – 11 October 1942; Oblt.z.S. Peter Schrewe; 18 June – 10 September 1942; Kptlt. Hans-Jürgen Zetzsche; 10 September – 11 October 1942 (acting); Kptlt. Erich Mäder; 12 October 1942 – 20 October 1943
- Operations: 8 patrols: 1st patrol: a. 11 – 12 March 1942; b. 15 March – 1 April 1942; 2nd patrol: 7 – 20 April 1942; 3rd patrol: a. 29 April – 6 May 1942; b. 8 – 12 May 1942; 4th patrol: a. 12 September 1942; b. 17 – 19 October 1942; c. 7 – 9 November 1942; 5th patrol: a. 11 November – 12 December 1942; b. 15 – 17 December 1942; c. 7 – 12 March 1943; 6th patrol: 15 March – 1 April 1943; 7th patrol: 12 April – 4 June 1943; 8th patrol: 6 September – 20 October 1943
- Victories: 1 warship sunk (1,920 tons)

German submarine U-378 was a Type VIIC U-boat of Nazi Germany's Kriegsmarine during World War II.

She carried out eight patrols before being sunk by US aircraft on 20 October 1943 in mid-Atlantic at position 47°40′N 28°27′W.

She was a member of 16 wolfpacks.

She sank one warship.

== Design ==
German Type VIIC submarines were preceded by the shorter Type VIIB submarines. U-378 had a displacement of 769 tonnes (757 long tons) when at the surface and 871 tonnes (857 long tons) while submerged. She had a total length of 67.10 m (220 ft 2 in), a pressure hull length of 50.50 m (165 ft 8 in), a beam of 6.20 m (20 ft 4 in), a height of 9.60 m (31 ft 6 in), and a draught of 4.74 m (15 ft 7 in). The submarine was powered by two Germaniawerft F46 four-stroke, six-cylinder supercharged diesel engines producing a total of 2,800 to 3,200 metric horsepower (2,060 to 2,350 kW; 2,760 to 3,160 shp) for use while surfaced, two Garbe, Lahmeyer & Co. RP 137/c double-acting electric motors producing a total of 750 metric horsepower (550 kW; 740 shp) for use while submerged. She had two shafts and two 1.23 m (4 ft) propellers. The boat was capable of operating at depths of up to 230 metres (750 ft).

The submarine had a maximum surface speed of 17.7 knots (32.8 km/h; 20.4 mph) and a maximum submerged speed of 7.6 knots (14.1 km/h; 8.7 mph). When submerged, the boat could operate for 80 nautical miles (150 km; 92 mi) at 4 knots (7.4 km/h; 4.6 mph); when surfaced, she could travel 8,500 nautical miles (15,700 km; 9,800 mi) at 10 knots (19 km/h; 12 mph). U-378 was fitted with five 53.3 cm (21 in) torpedo tubes (four fitted at the bow and one at the stern), fourteen torpedoes, one 8.8 cm (3.46 in) SK C/35 naval gun, 220 rounds, and a 2 cm (0.79 in) C/30 anti-aircraft gun. The boat had a complement of between forty-four and sixty.

== Service history ==
The submarine was laid down on 3 May 1940 at the Howaldtswerke yard at Kiel as yard number 9, launched on 13 September 1941 and commissioned on 30 October under the command of Kapitänleutnant Alfred Hoschatt.

=== First patrol ===
The boat's first patrol was in two parts and commenced with her departure from Kiel on 11 March 1942. The second part began from the German island of Helgoland (sometimes spelt 'Heligoland'). She was attacked northeast of Norway's North Cape by the British destroyer HMS Fury. No damage was sustained.

=== Second to sixth patrols ===
U-378 continued to operate in northern waters such as the Barents, Greenland and Norwegian seas until April 1943 when her sphere of operations changed to the Atlantic Ocean.

=== Seventh patrol ===
This sortie saw the boat leave Trondheim on 12 April 1943, negotiate the gap separating Iceland and the Faroe Islands and sail as far westward as Newfoundland and Labrador. She then re-crossed the Atlantic, docking at La Pallice in occupied France on 4 June. At 54 days, this was easily the submarine's longest patrol.

=== Eighth patrol and loss ===
U-378 sank the Polish destroyer Orkan on 8 October 1943. Her commander, ten officers, 166 ratings and seven British crew members were lost.

On 13 October, the boat was the target of a FIDO homing torpedo that had been dropped from a Grumman TBF Avenger, but the weapon missed.

The submarine was sunk by an Avenger / Wildcat pair on 20 October in mid-Atlantic from USS Core. Forty-eight men died in the depth charge attack; there were no survivors.

=== Wolfpacks ===
U-378 took part in 16 wolfpacks, namely:

- Zieten (23 – 29 March 1942)
- Eiswolf (29 – 31 March 1942)
- Robbenschlag (7 – 14 April 1942)
- Blutrausch (15 – 19 April 1942)
- Strauchritter (29 April – 5 May 1942)
- Trägertod (19 – 22 September 1942)
- Boreas (19 November – 9 December 1942)
- Eisbär (27 – 30 March 1943)
- Meise (25 – 27 April 1943)
- Star (27 April – 4 May 1943)
- Fink (4 – 6 May 1943)
- Naab (12 – 15 May 1943)
- Donau 2 (15 – 19 May 1943)
- Mosel (19 – 24 May 1943)
- Leuthen (15 – 24 September 1943)
- Rossbach (24 September – 9 October 1943)

== Summary of raiding history ==
Date	Ship Name	Nationality	Tonnage (Note: Merchant ship tonnages are in gross register tons. Military vessels are listed by tons displacement.)	Fate
8 October 1943	ORP Orkan	Polish Navy	1,920	Sunk

== Bibliography ==
- Busch, Rainer; Röll, Hans-Joachim (1999). German U-boat commanders of World War II : a biographical dictionary. Translated by Brooks, Geoffrey. London, Annapolis, Md: Greenhill Books, Naval Institute Press. ISBN 1-55750-186-6.
- Busch, Rainer; Röll, Hans-Joachim (1999). Deutsche U-Boot-Verluste von September 1939 bis Mai 1945 [German U-boat losses from September 1939 to May 1945]. Der U-Boot-Krieg (in German). Vol. IV. Hamburg, Berlin, Bonn: Mittler. ISBN 3-8132-0514-2.
- Gröner, Erich; Jung, Dieter; Maass, Martin (1991). U-boats and Mine Warfare Vessels. German Warships 1815–1945. Vol. 2. Translated by Thomas, Keith; Magowan, Rachel. London: Conway Maritime Press. ISBN 0-85177-593-4.
- Kemp, Paul (1999). U-Boats Destroyed – German Submarine Losses in the World Wars. London: Arms & Armour. ISBN 1-85409-515-3.
