= HMS Matchless (G52) =

Destroyer built during WWII

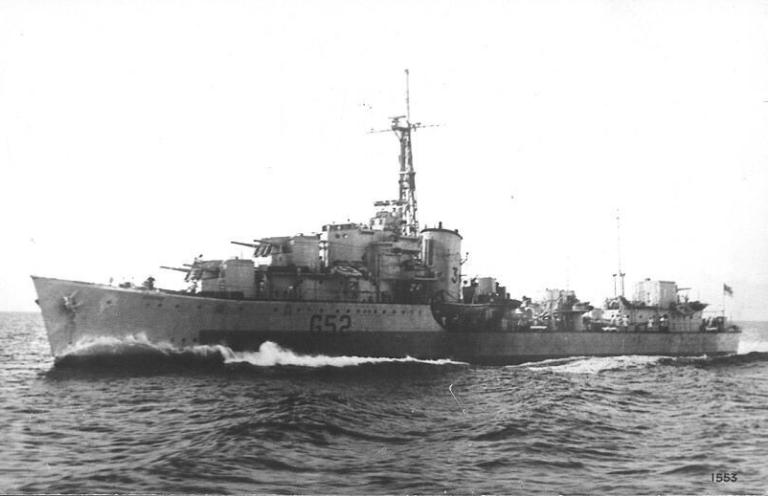

History

United Kingdom
- Name: Matchless
- Ordered: 7 July 1939
- Builder: Alexander Stephen and Sons, Linthouse, Scotland
- Laid down: 14 September 1940
- Launched: 4 September 1941
- Completed: 26 February 1942
- Commissioned: 12 February 1942
- Recommissioned: August 1944
- Decommissioned: April 1946
- Fate: Sold to the Turkish Navy 16 July 1959
- Notes: Pennant number G52

Turkey
- Name: TCG Kılıç Ali Paşa
- Namesake: Uluç Ali Reis
- Acquired: 29 June 1959
- Stricken: August 1971
- Identification: D350
- Fate: Scrapped

General characteristics (as built)
- Class & type: M-class destroyer
- Displacement: 1,920 long tons (1,950 t) (standard); 2,725 long tons (2,769 t) (deep load)
- Length: 362 ft 3 in (110.4 m) (o/a)
- Beam: 37 ft (11.3 m)
- Draught: 14 ft (4.3 m)
- Installed power: 2 × Admiralty 3-drum boilers; 48,000 shaft horsepower (36,000 kW)
- Propulsion: 2 × shafts; 2 × geared steam turbines
- Speed: 36 knots (67 km/h; 41 mph)
- Range: 5,500 nmi (10,200 km; 6,300 mi) at 15 knots (28 km/h; 17 mph)
- Complement: 190
- Sensors & processing systems: ASDIC; Type 285 gunnery radar; Type 290 air warning radar
- Armament: 3 × twin 4.7 in (120 mm) DP guns; 1 × single 4 in (102 mm) AA gun; 1 × quadruple 2-pdr (40 mm) AA guns; 2 × single Oerlikon 20 mm (0.8 in) AA guns; 2 × quadruple, 2 × twin 0.5 in (12.7 mm) anti-aircraft machineguns; 1 × quadruple 21 in (533 mm) torpedo tubes; 42 × depth charges, 2 × racks, 2 × throwers

HMS Matchless was an M-class destroyer built during World War II. After the war she was placed in reserve until August 1957 and eventually sold to the Turkish Navy, who renamed her TCG Kılıç Ali Paşa. She was struck from the Turkish Navy list and scrapped in 1971.

== Adoptions ==
Maidenhead Borough Council in Berkshire officially adopted HMS Matchless after holding a Warship Week in March 1942 that raised £550,296. A ship's badge was presented to the borough in September 1942.

Associated Motor Cycles in southeast London, which made Matchless motorcycles, unofficially adopted the ship in 1943. After the Battle of the North Cape in December 1943 her battle flag and other mementoes were presented to the company.

== Service ==
=== Scapa Flow ===
Matchless undertook sea trials in the Firth of Clyde and then joined the Home Fleet at Scapa Flow for crew training in gunnery and torpedo attacks. Her first active service was on an Arctic convoy to Murmansk and the Kola Inlet. On 13 May 1942 she was one of four destroyers that sailed from Murmansk escorting the light cruiser Trinidad, which had been damaged during a previous convoy and partially repaired for her homeward voyage. On 15 May 20 Ju 88 bombers attacked the flotilla and one bomb set Trinidad on fire and crippled her. Matchless rescued over 200 survivors and then scuttled Trinidad by torpedoing her.

=== Malta ===
In June 1942 Matchless took part in Operation Harpoon: a heavily armed convoy to relieve the besieged island of Malta. The convoy sailed from Gibraltar on 12 June and Matchless was damaged by a mine off Malta on 15 June. This forced her to remain in Malta for repairs, where she survived 265 air raids. In August she sailed from Malta disguised as an Italian warship. She reached Gibraltar just in time to join Operation Pedestal, which was the next convoy to relieve Malta.

=== Arctic Convoys ===
After Operation Pedestal, Matchless escorted two successful Arctic convoys from Loch Ewe to the Kola Inlet: JW 51A in December 1942 and JW 51B in December and January. In May and June 1943 Matchless escorted the ocean liner RMS Queen Mary part-way across the North Atlantic while the liner was carrying Winston Churchill to the United States. She then escorted further Arctic convoys: JW 54B in November 1943 and JW 55A in December 1943.

==== Sinking Scharnhorst ====
On 24–25 December 1943 Matchless was returning from the Kola Inlet escorting Convoy RA 55A when she and three other destroyers were ordered to detach from that convoy and join a JW convoy heading for Russia. It was believed the German battleship Scharnhorst might be on the point of leaving her Norwegian fjord base to attack the convoys. On Christmas Day came a message that the 10th Cruiser Squadron consisting of Belfast, Norfolk and Sheffield (Vice Admiral Robert Burnett) had been in action against Scharnhorst. Her mission was to attack the convoys, but she had been ordered to avoid battle with heavy Allied units and she disengaged from the cruisers; with her superior speed was soon out of contact. Burnett believed she might be heading north to attack the convoys; he also headed north and on Boxing Day made contact again, exchanging fire, during which the Norfolk was hit.

Scharnhorst disengaged again and headed south for the safety of her Altafjord base. The cruisers and destroyers shadowed Scharnhorst. Burnett was aware that a heavier Royal Navy force commanded by Admiral Bruce Fraser aboard the battleship Duke of York was steaming from the west to intercept her. Admiral Erich Bey aboard Scharnhorst was not aware of this. About 5.15 p.m. the black of the winter Arctic night was lit up as bright as day by starshell and the battle began. Outnumbered, outgunned, surrounded, her retreat cut off, there could be only one end. She was weakened first by shellfire from Duke of York, then by torpedoes from the cruiser Jamaica, British and Norwegian destroyers. The destroyer detachment from Convoy JW 55A, including Matchless, closed in and sank Scharnhorst with a further 19 torpedoes, it going under around 7.15 p.m. Only 36 survivors were recovered; Matchless picking up six of them.

=== Return to Home Fleet ===
After the battle, Matchless returned to Scapa Flow, resumed duties with the Home Fleet and performed escort duties including further Arctic convoys until August 1944. She was then paid off in Hull, but after repairs and a re-fit she was recommissioned later the same month. Matchless saw further service in the Mediterranean until 1945, and was then decommissioned in April 1946.

=== Laid Up ===
Matchless was then laid up off Portchester Castle in Hampshire where she was held in reserve until at least 1957. Along with three other ships of the same class she was transferred to the Turkish Navy as part of an agreement signed at Ankara on 16 August 1957. They underwent a refit which involved the removal of the after set of torpedo tubes and some secondary armament. They received a new deckhouse and Squid anti-submarine weapons system. On 29 June 1959 they were handed over at Portsmouth. Matchless, which was refitted at Harland & Wolff's shipyard at Govan, Glasgow, was commissioned as TCG Kılıç Ali Paşa (D-350) after an Italian-born 16th century Turkish admiral, Uluç Ali Reis (1519–87).

She served in the Turkish Navy until 1971, when she was struck from the list and scrapped.

== Heritage ==
After the war an HMS Matchless Association was formed to unite personnel who had served aboard her. The ship's badge that was presented to Maidenhead Borough Council in 1942 has since been lost. For a time the ship's battle flag from the Battle of the North Cape hung in the Directors' Office at Associated Motor Cycles' factory in Plumstead. The flag, along with a photograph of the ship and a letter from her commanding officer, Lieutenant Commander J. Mowlam, were lost after AMC went into receivership in 1966.
