= HMS Lance (G87) =

Destroyer of the Royal Navy

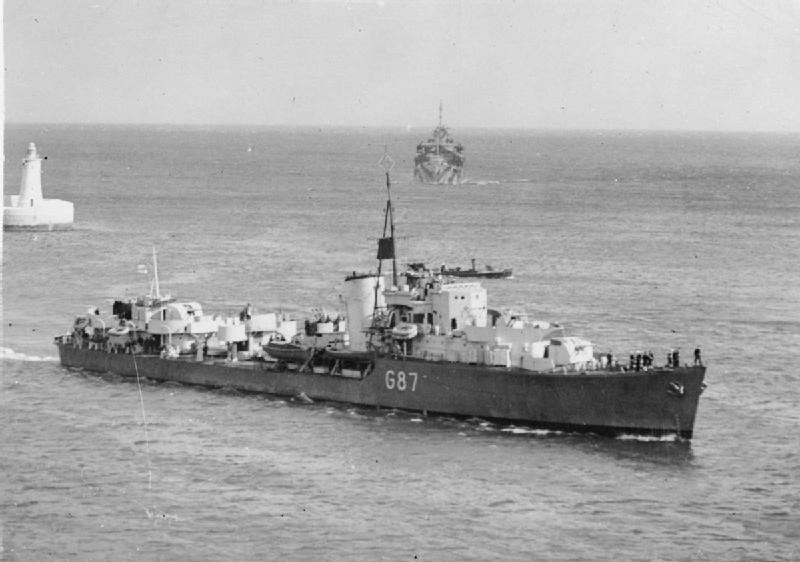
- Lance in Grand Harbour, 8 January 1942

History

United Kingdom
- Name: HMS Lance
- Ordered: 31 March 1938
- Builder: Yarrow Shipbuilders, Scotstoun, Glasgow
- Laid down: 1 March 1939
- Launched: 28 November 1940
- Commissioned: 13 May 1941
- Fate: Damaged by bombs on 5 and 9 April 1942. Declared a constructive total loss and scrapped.
- Badge: Badge: On a Field barry wavy of four White and Blue, issuant from the base a Lance Red.

General characteristics
- Class & type: L-class destroyer
- Displacement: 1,920 tons
- Length: 362.5 ft (110.5 m)
- Beam: 36.7 ft (11.2 m)
- Draught: 10 ft (3.0 m)
- Propulsion: Two shafts; Two geared steam turbines; Two drum-type boilers; 48000 shp (35.8 MW)
- Speed: 36 kt (66.7 km/h)
- Range: 5,500 nmi (10,200 km; 6,300 mi) at 15 knots (28 km/h; 17 mph)
- Complement: 221
- Armament: 4 × twin QF 4-inch (102 mm) Mk XVI guns; 1 × quadruple QF 2 pdr Mk VIII L/39 (40 mm); 2 × quadruple QF 0.5 in Mk III Vickers (12.7 mm); 2 × quadruple 21 inch (533 mm) torpedo tubes

HMS Lance was an L-class destroyer of the Royal Navy. She entered service during World War II, and had a short but eventful career, serving in Home waters and the Mediterranean Sea. She was damaged in two consecutive air attacks at Malta in 1942. She was towed back to Britain, declared a constructive total loss and was scrapped. She had been adopted by the civil community of Bexley and Welling, Kent in November 1941.

== Construction and commissioning ==
Lance was ordered from the yards of Yarrow Shipbuilders, Scotstoun, Glasgow on 31 March 1938 under the 1937 Naval Estimates. She was laid down on 1 March 1939 at the same time as her sister, Laforey. She was launched on 28 November 1940 and commissioned on 13 May 1941. She cost £440,204, excluding items such as weapons and communications equipment supplied by the Admiralty. On commissioning she was assigned to the 4th Destroyer Flotilla.

== Career ==
=== Home waters ===
Once commissioned, Lance was based at Scapa Flow with other ships of the Home Fleet. On 22 May she escorted the battleship King George V in the search for the German battleship Bismarck. She suffered machinery defects whilst at sea and was detached from the Home Fleet units and returned to Scapa Flow. She rejoined the search on 26 May, and then escorted King George V back to the UK after the sinking of Bismarck.

In June she was assigned to the Western Approaches Command with the 11th Escort Group, based at Greenock. On 22 June she and Legion escorted the aircraft carrier Furious through the Atlantic Ocean to Gibraltar as part of an operation to deliver aircraft to Malta. She continued to participate in the operation, escorting the aircraft carrier Ark Royal and other units of the Mediterranean Fleet to Malta throughout the month. She returned to Greenock in July and resumed escort and convoy defence duties.

=== Mediterranean ===
August was spent escorting convoys through the North Western Approaches before she returned to Gibraltar at the end of the month to escort convoys into the Mediterranean. She continued to screen the convoys to Malta and was part of the escort for the convoys of Operation Halberd. During this the ships came under heavy air and submarine attack, but managed to reach Malta. After this success, Lance returned to Gibraltar with the other ships of the Fleet. She began a maintenance period on 1 October, which lasted until 12 October. She then joined Force K, which was tasked with intercepting enemy supply convoys on passage to North Africa. On 9 November the task force engaged a convoy which consisted of seven ships escorted by the Italian destroyers Fulmine, Euro, Maestrale, Libeccio, Alfredo Oriani and Grecale, covered by the cruisers Trento and Trieste. In the ensuing battle, which became known as the Battle of the Duisburg Convoy, all of the merchant vessels and Fulmine were sunk.

On 23 November Lance left Malta with the rest of Force K, after reports of a convoy on passage from Taranto to Benghazi. On 24 November they sighted the German supply ships Maritza and Procidas with an escort of two Italian torpedo boats. Both merchants were set on fire and sunk. After a brief period docked in Malta, Lance returned to convoy escort duties. On 17 December she became involved in the First Battle of Sirte. On 19 December she assisted in rescue operations after several ships of Force K ran into a newly laid Italian minefield. With Havock she escorted the cruiser Exeter back to Malta. Kandahar and Neptune were sunk, whilst Aurora and Penelope were badly damaged.

Lance spent January 1942 escorting convoys in the Mediterranean and in February she was transferred to the 22nd Destroyer Flotilla. Further escort duties followed. On 13 February she was escorting Convoy MW-9 when it came under air attack. The merchant vessel Clan Campbell was badly damaged and was detached to make her way to Tobruk, escorted by two destroyers. Further air attacks followed the next day and the convoy suffered heavy losses. Lance remained with the convoy until 15 February when she sailed to Malta with Penelope and Legion. On 16 February she was moved to the dockyard to undergo repairs.

== Bombing ==
In March Lance was docked for repairs that were expected to last until April. On 5 April she was hit by a bomb dropped during an air raid on the docks. She sustained serious damage, including being knocked off the blocks and being partially submerged. On 9 April she suffered further bomb damage in an attack by Junkers Ju 87 aircraft from Sturzkampfgeschwader 3 and work was suspended. Her wreck was subsequently salvaged and towed to Chatham Dockyard for a full survey to establish the extent of repair that would be required to return her to service. She was found to be beyond economical repair and was declared a Constructive Total Loss. Lance was placed on the Disposal List in 1944 and was sold for demolition by Thos. W. Ward. She was towed to the breaker's yard at Thos. W. Ward Grays, Essex, where she arrived in June that year.

== Ensign ==
The White Ensign for HMS Lance is laid up in the Seaman's Chapel of Lincoln Cathedral.
