= HMS Musketeer (G86) =

Destroyer of the Royal Navy

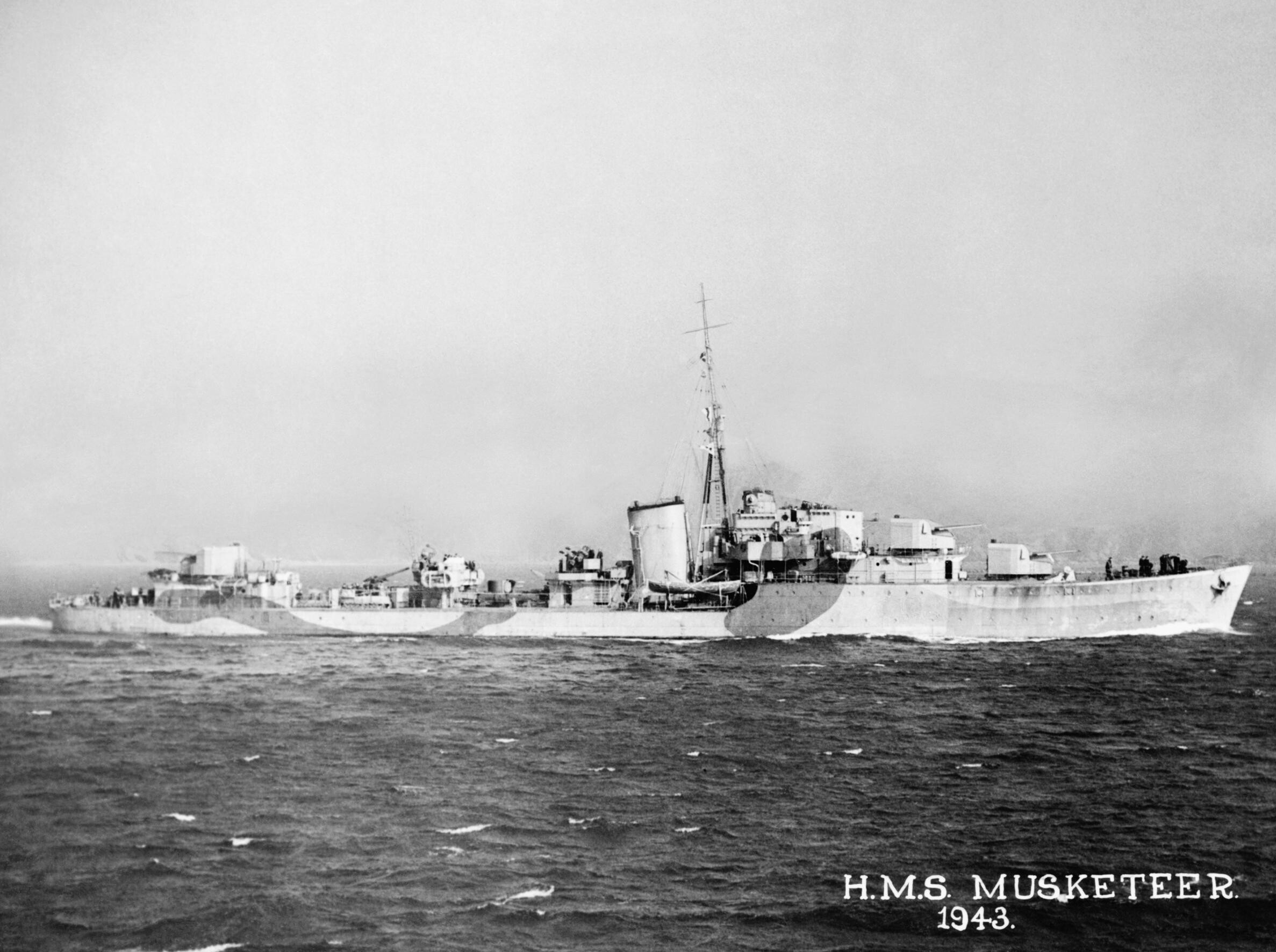
- Musketeer underway

History

United Kingdom
- Name: HMS Musketeer
- Ordered: 7 July 1939
- Builder: Fairfield Shipbuilding and Engineering Company, Govan
- Laid down: 7 December 1939
- Launched: 2 December 1941
- Completed: 18 September 1942
- Identification: Pennant number: G86
- Fate: Sold for scrap 3 September 1955

General characteristics (as built)
- Class & type: M-class destroyer
- Displacement: 1,920 long tons (1,950 t) (standard); 2,725 long tons (2,769 t) (deep load)
- Length: 362 ft 3 in (110.4 m) (o/a)
- Beam: 37 ft (11.3 m)
- Draught: 14 ft (4.3 m)
- Installed power: 48,000 shp (36,000 kW); 2 × Admiralty 3-drum boilers
- Propulsion: 2 × shafts; 2 × geared steam turbines
- Speed: 36 knots (67 km/h; 41 mph)
- Range: 5,500 nmi (10,200 km; 6,300 mi) at 15 knots (28 km/h; 17 mph)
- Complement: 190
- Sensors & processing systems: ASDIC; Type 285 gunnery radar; Type 290 air warning radar
- Armament: 3 × twin 4.7 in (120 mm) Mk XI dual-purpose guns; 1 × single QF 4 in (102 mm) Mk V anti-aircraft gun; 1 × quadruple QF 2-pdr (40 mm) Mk VIII AA guns; 2 × single Oerlikon 20 mm (0.8 in) AA guns; 2 × quadruple, 2 × twin 0.5 in (12.7 mm) Vickers Mark III anti-aircraft machineguns; 1 × quadruple 21 in (533 mm) torpedo tubes; 42 × depth charges, 2 × racks, 2 × throwers

HMS Musketeer was a M-class destroyer built for the Royal Navy during World War II. She was ordered from Fairfield's, Govan, Glasgow on 7 September 1939 under the 1939 Build Programme and laid down on 7 December the same year. She was launched on 2 December 1941 and completed on 18 September 1942 at a cost of £462,543. Musketeer was adopted in December 1941 by the community of East Barnet, now part of Greater London. Musketeer was the second RN ship to carry this name; the first was a destroyer built in 1915 and sold in 1921.

== World War 2 Service ==
=== Arctic Convoys ===
Musketeer commissioned on 9 September 1942 and joined the Home Fleet as part of the 3rd Destroyer Flotilla covering the North Sea and the North Western Approaches. In November 1942 she was switched to duty with the convoys to the Soviet Union, protecting merchant shipping delivering vital supplies to Russia for her war against Nazi Germany. This was a role that Musketeer was to perform for most of her wartime service, although from May to September 1943, following a refit, she once again served in the Home Fleet guarding the Western Approaches. On 27 September 1943 she took part in a mission in support of Royal Air Force (RAF) attempts to neutralise the German battleship Tirpitz, when she ferried RAF personnel from the Faroe Islands to Murmansk. Murmansk was the base for reconnaissance flights to Tripitz's anchorage in the Altafjord in Norway. These flights were used in the planning of an eventual RAF bombing raid on the battleship. On 25 February 1944 Musketeer was involved in a collision with the Polish destroyer ORP Błyskawica, breaking off from convoy duty to be taken in hand for repair by Brigham and Cowan shipyard in Hull. Repairs were completed by the end of March 1944 and in early April the ship was again back on Russian convoy duty.

=== Mediterranean ===
On 3 October 1944, Musketeer was assigned for service in the Eastern Mediterranean. She worked mainly in the Aegean supporting the re-capture of enemy-held islands and operating against the small Greek Communist ships of the ELAN. Following VE day in May 1945 Musketeer continued her service in the Mediterranean and helped in the support of the garrisons in Trieste and mainland Greece.

== Proposed Post-War Conversion ==
In the early 1950s, it was proposed to convert the five remaining ships of the M class, together with seven War Emergency Programme destroyers to Type 62 Air Direction Frigates. The conversion would have involved replacement of the ships' armament and sensors. The initial proposal would have armed the ships with a twin 4-inch gun mount, a twin 40 mm Bofors gun and a Squid anti-submarine mortar. Type 982 and 983 air direction radars would be fitted, as would Type 162 and 166 sonars. In March 1952, the programme was reduced, as the War Emergency Destroyers were too small to accommodate the heavy radars. Later that year, it was decided to substitute a US twin 3"/50 caliber gun mount for the 4-inch guns. The project was finally abandoned in May 1954, partly owing to the condition of the ships and poor shock-resistance. Musketeer was subsequently sold for scrap and broken up in 1955, while the four remaining M class were sold to Turkey in 1958.
