= German submarine U-990 =

German World War II submarine

History

Nazi Germany
- Name: U-990
- Ordered: 25 May 1941
- Builder: Blohm & Voss, Hamburg
- Yard number: 190
- Laid down: 17 October 1942
- Launched: 16 June 1943
- Commissioned: 28 July 1943
- Fate: Sunk on 25 May 1944 in the Norwegian Sea by depth charges from an RAF Liberator bomber

General characteristics
- Class & type: Type VIIC submarine
- Displacement: 769 tonnes (757 long tons) surfaced; 871 t (857 long tons) submerged
- Length: 67.10 m (220 ft 2 in) o/a; 50.50 m (165 ft 8 in) pressure hull
- Beam: 6.20 m (20 ft 4 in) o/a; 4.70 m (15 ft 5 in) pressure hull
- Draught: 4.74 m (15 ft 7 in)
- Installed power: 2,800–3,200 PS (2,100–2,400 kW; 2,800–3,200 bhp) (diesels); 750 PS (550 kW; 740 shp) (electric)
- Propulsion: 2 shafts; 2 × diesel engines; 2 × electric motors
- Speed: 17.7 knots (32.8 km/h; 20.4 mph) surfaced; 7.6 knots (14.1 km/h; 8.7 mph) submerged
- Range: 8,500 nmi (15,700 km; 9,800 mi) at 10 knots (19 km/h; 12 mph) surfaced; 80 nmi (150 km; 92 mi) at 4 knots (7.4 km/h; 4.6 mph) submerged
- Test depth: 230 m (750 ft); Crush depth: 250–295 m (820–968 ft)
- Complement: 4 officers, 40–56 enlisted
- Armament: 5 × 53.3 cm (21 in) torpedo tubes (4 bow, 1 stern); 14 × torpedoes or 26 TMA mines; 1 × 8.8 cm (3.46 in) deck gun (220 rounds); 1 × twin 2 cm (0.79 in) C/30 anti-aircraft gun

Service record
- Part of: 5th U-boat Flotilla; 28 July – 31 December 1943; 11th U-boat Flotilla; 1 January – 25 May 1944
- Identification codes: M 54 093
- Commanders: Kptlt. Hubert Nordheimer; 28 July 1943 – 25 May 1944
- Operations: 4 patrols: 1st patrol: 26 January – 28 February 1944; 2nd patrol: 4 – 27 March 1944; 3rd patrol: a. 31 March – 5 April 1944; b. 8 – 12 April 1944; 4th patrol: 22 – 25 May 1944
- Victories: 1 warship sunk (1,920 tons)

German submarine U-990 was a Type VIIC U-boat built for Nazi Germany's Kriegsmarine for service during World War II. She was laid down on 17 October 1942 by Blohm & Voss, Hamburg as yard number 190, launched on 16 June 1943 and commissioned on 28 July 1943 under Kapitänleutnant Hubert Nordheimer.

== Design ==
German Type VIIC submarines were preceded by the shorter Type VIIB submarines. U-990 had a displacement of 769 tonnes (757 long tons) when at the surface and 871 tonnes (857 long tons) while submerged. She had a total length of 67.10 m (220 ft 2 in), a pressure hull length of 50.50 m (165 ft 8 in), a beam of 6.20 m (20 ft 4 in), a height of 9.60 m (31 ft 6 in), and a draught of 4.74 m (15 ft 7 in). The submarine was powered by two Germaniawerft F46 four-stroke, six-cylinder supercharged diesel engines producing a total of 2,800 to 3,200 metric horsepower (2,060 to 2,350 kW; 2,760 to 3,160 shp) for use while surfaced, and two Brown, Boveri & Cie GG UB 720/8 double-acting electric motors producing a total of 750 metric horsepower (550 kW; 740 shp) for use while submerged. She had two shafts and two 1.23 m (4 ft) propellers. The boat was capable of operating at depths of up to 230 metres (750 ft).

The submarine had a maximum surface speed of 17.7 knots (32.8 km/h; 20.4 mph) and a maximum submerged speed of 7.6 knots (14.1 km/h; 8.7 mph). When submerged, the boat could operate for 80 nautical miles (150 km; 92 mi) at 4 knots (7.4 km/h; 4.6 mph); when surfaced, she could travel 8,500 nautical miles (15,700 km; 9,800 mi) at 10 knots (19 km/h; 12 mph). U-990 was fitted with five 53.3 cm (21 in) torpedo tubes (four fitted at the bow and one at the stern), fourteen torpedoes, one 8.8 cm (3.46 in) SK C/35 naval gun, 220 rounds, and one twin 2 cm (0.79 in) C/30 anti-aircraft gun. The boat had a crew sized between forty-four and sixty.

== Service history ==
The boat's career began with training at 5th Flotilla on 28 July 1943, followed by active service on 1 January 1944 as part of the 11th Flotilla.

=== Wolfpacks ===
U-990 took part in four wolfpacks, namely:

- Werwolf (28 January – 27 February 1944)
- Orkan (5 – 10 March 1944)
- Hammer (10 – 26 March 1944)
- Blitz (2 – 4 April 1944)

=== Fate ===
U-990 was sunk on 25 May 1944 in the Norwegian Sea at 65°05′N 07°28′E after being depth charged by an RAF Liberator bomber of 59 Squadron.

Sqn Ldr B. Sisson sighted U-990 on the surface at 06:23 and attacked under cover of a rain squall, dropping six depth charges. Following the attack, the submarine could be seen sinking amid a large oil slick.

There were 20 crew killed, and 33 survivors.

== Summary of raiding history ==
Date	Ship Name	Nationality	Tonnage (Note: Merchant ship tonnages are in gross register tons. Military vessels are listed by tons displacement.)	Fate
25 February 1944	HMS Mahratta	Royal Navy	1,920	Sunk

== Bibliography ==
- Busch, Rainer; Röll, Hans-Joachim (1999). German U-boat commanders of World War II : a biographical dictionary. Translated by Brooks, Geoffrey. London, Annapolis, Md: Greenhill Books, Naval Institute Press. ISBN 1-55750-186-6.
- Gröner, Erich; Jung, Dieter; Maass, Martin (1991). U-boats and Mine Warfare Vessels. German Warships 1815–1945. Vol. 2. Translated by Thomas, Keith; Magowan, Rachel. London: Conway Maritime Press. ISBN 0-85177-593-4.
- Sharpe, Peter (1998). U-Boat Fact File. Great Britain: Midland Publishing. ISBN 1-85780-072-9.
