= QF 4.7-inch Mk XI naval gun =

QF 4.7 inch Mark XI
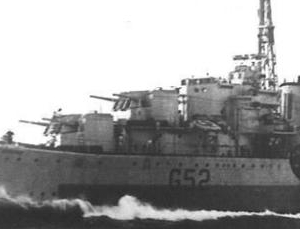
- Forward turrets on HMS Matchless
- Type: Dual-purpose gun
- Place of origin: United Kingdom

Service history
- In service: 1941–1970
- Used by: Royal Navy; Turkish Navy
- Wars: World War II; Korean War

Production history
- Designed: 1937–39?
- No. built: 87

Specifications
- Mass: 3.351 long tons (3,405 kg)
- Length: 247.7 in (6.29 m)
- Barrel length: Bore: 236.2 in (6.00 m) L/50 (cal)
- Shell: Separate-loading
- Shell weight: 62 pounds (28.1 kg) SAP or HE
- Calibre: 4.724 inches (120.0 mm)
- Breech: Semi-automatic horizontal sliding-block
- Recoil: Hydro-pneumatic
- Elevation: -10° to +50°
- Rate of fire: 10 rounds per minute
- Muzzle velocity: 2,538 ft/s (774 m/s)
- Maximum firing range: 21,240 yards (19,420 m) at 45°

The 4.7 inch QF Mark XI (Note: Mark XI = Mark 11. Britain used Roman numerals to denote Marks (i.e. models) of ordnance until after World War II. Hence this article covers the eleventh model of British QF 4.7-inch gun.) was a 50-calibre, 4.7-inch (120 mm) naval gun mounted on Royal Navy (RN) and Allied destroyers during World War II.

== Description and history ==
The QF 4.7-inch Mk XI gun, on the Mk XX twin mounting, was introduced to the RN aboard the L and M class destroyers, in commission from 1941 onwards. It featured a 62 lb (28.1 kg) shell fired at 2,538 ft/second (774 m/s) to a maximum range of 21,240 yards (19,420 m) at 45 degrees of elevation. The Mk XX mounting was fully enclosed, but the hoists did not revolve with the turret. The gun's firing cycle was six seconds and the separate shell and cordite hoists for each gun provided shells and cartridges at a rate of 10 per minute. The shells and cartridges were transferred from the hoists to the tilting tray of the fuze-setting machine by hand. Once the fuzes were set, they slid forward to the loading tray from which they were rammed forward into the breech by a hydraulic rammer. The horizontal sliding-block breech opened semi-automatically after the guns fired.

The guns could be loaded at any angle of elevation. The Mk XX mounting could elevate to a maximum of 50° and depress to −10°. The turret had a maximum powered training rate of 10° per second, but was manually elevated. Including the crew and ammunition, the revolving weight of the mounting was 37.363 long tons (37.963 t). It was protected by a gun shield .25 inches (6.4 mm) thick, too thin to hold a direct hit, but still appreciable versus small splinters, explosions, small caliber rifles.

With a shell 24% heavier, the new gun was far more powerful than the previous 45 calibre long 4.7 inch gun making it a match for a weapon such as the Italian 120/50 mm, whilst also improving its anti-aircraft capacity. It could now penetrate 3 in (76 mm) of armour at a range of 6.2 mi (10 km) rather than 3.7 mi (5.9 km). In the Battle of Pantelleria on 15 June 1942, HMS Marne, Matchless, and Ithuriel engaged a superior Italian task force. Marne fired 704 shells, Matchless 746 shells, while Ithuriel (with four 4.7 /45) managed to fire only 246 shells. Marne hit the cruiser Eugenio di Savoia with a shell at around 5.50 a.m. Matchless failed to hit Raimondo Montecuccoli, but later hit the large destroyer Ugolino Vivaldi. The new 120/50 mm shell was heavy and powerful and the Italian destroyer was soon lying dead in the water, with a furious fire amidships. That destroyer was saved only by towing her to a near naval base, where the fire was finally extinguished.

In the words of Tony DiGiulian, the 120/50 Mark XI gun was perhaps the finest destroyer gun made by British during World War II, but it was also heavy and costly, as were the ships equipped with it. Wartime production required a much greater production of ships and guns, so cheaper weapons were installed in many other classes, like the 'O' and 'P' (102 mm) and furthers (with the old 120 mm), until the 113 mm (4.5 in) began to replace them, as the first, powerful dual purpose destroyer gun.
