= Type 285 radar =

British gun laying radar

- Country of origin: United Kingdom
- Introduced: 1940
- Type: Fire-control radar
- Frequency: 600 MHz
- Beamwidth: 18° (horizontal); 43° (vertical)
- Pulsewidth: 2 μs
- Range: 18,000 yd (16,000 m)
- Altitude: 15,000 ft (4,600 m)
- Precision: 150 yd (140 m)
- Power: 25 kW

The Type 285 radar was a British naval gunnery radar developed during the Second World War. The Type 285 was used as a surface and anti-aircraft ranging radar on smaller ships, and as an anti-aircraft radar on larger ships. The prototype was tested at sea aboard the escort destroyer HMS Southdown in August 1940.

The Type 284 radar used the same electronics with a different antenna system, and was used for surface fire control on larger ships (cruisers and battleships).

Type	Aerial outfit	Peak power (kW)	Frequency (MHz)	Wavelength (cm)	In service
285		25	600	50	1941
285M		150	600	50	1941
285P		150	600	50	1942

== Bibliography ==
- Campbell, John (1985). Naval Weapons of World War II. Annapolis, Maryland: Naval Institute Press. ISBN 978-0-87021-459-2.
- Friedman, Norman (1981). Naval Radar. London: Conway Maritime Press. ISBN 0-85177-238-2.
- Watson, Raymond C. Jr. (2009). Radar Origins Worldwide: History of Its Evolution in 13 Nations Through World War II. Trafford. ISBN 978-1-4269-2111-7.
