= Arctic naval operations of World War II =

Naval theatre of operations

- Part of the European Theater and the Battle of the Atlantic of World War II
- Map of the Arctic Circle
Date	6 September 1939 – 29 April 1945 (5 years, 7 months, 3 weeks and 2 days)
Location	Arctic Circle
Result	Allied victory

Belligerents
1939–1940; Germany Soviet Union	1939–1940; Norway (1940); United Kingdom; France; Poland Finland
1941–1945: Germany; Quisling regime (from 1942); Finland (until 1944)	1941–1945: Soviet Union; Norway; Norwegian resistance; United Kingdom; Canada; Poland; United States; Greenland; Australia; Sirius Dog Sled Patrol; Finland (from 1944)

Commanders and leaders
(Nazi Germany) Hermann Göring; Erich Raeder; Karl Dönitz; Eduard Dietl; Lothar Rendulic; Franz Böhme	(United Kingdom) Dudley Pound; Andrew Cunningham; John Tovey; Bruce Fraser; (Soviet Union) Nikolai Kuznetsov; Arseniy Golovko; Valerian Frolov

Arctic naval operations of World War II were the World War II naval operations that took place in the Arctic Ocean, and can be considered part of the Battle of the Atlantic and/or of the European Theatre of World War II. (Note: Rear Admiral Samuel Eliot Morison's definitive History of United States Naval Operations in World War II includes operations from the north pole southward in the first volume entitled The Battle of the Atlantic. Eligibility for the United States European–African–Middle Eastern Campaign Medal was defined by Executive Order 9265 to include military service aboard a ship operating in the north polar region eastward from the 75th meridian west longitude to the 60th meridian east longitude.)

Pre-war navigation in the region focused on fishing and the international ore-trade from Narvik and Petsamo. Soviet settlements along the coast and rivers of the Barents Sea and Kara Sea relied upon summer coastal shipping for supplies from railheads at Arkhangelsk and Murmansk. The Soviet Union extended the Northern Sea Route past the Taymyr Peninsula to the Bering Strait in 1935. The Winter War of 1939-1940 between Finland and the Soviet Union opened the northern flank of the Eastern Front of World War II. The Arctic (Note: Wartime navigation over the waters within the Arctic Circle should not be confused with the Arctic Ocean as it may have subsequently been defined to exclude areas within the Arctic Circle.) was initially dominated by the Soviet Northern Fleet of a few destroyers, with larger numbers of submarines, minesweepers, and torpedo cutters supported by icebreakers. The success of the 1940 German invasion of Norway provided the Kriegsmarine with naval bases from which capital ships might challenge units of the British Royal Navy Home Fleet. Luftwaffe anti-shipping aircraft of Kampfgeschwader 26 (KG 26) and Kampfgeschwader 30 (KG 30) operated intermittently from Norwegian airfields, while Küstenfliegergruppen aircraft including Heinkel He 115s and Blohm & Voss BV 138s undertook routine reconnaissance. Following the 1941 Axis invasion of the Soviet Union, the Allies initiated a series of Arctic convoys to bring military supplies to the Soviet Union in formations of freighters screened by destroyers, corvettes and minesweepers. Escorting cruisers typically maneuvered outside the formations, while a larger covering force including battleships and aircraft carriers often steamed nearby to engage Kriegsmarine capital ships or to raid the German naval bases in Norway.

The Soviet Union and Germany each deployed smaller coastal convoys: to maintain the flow of supplies to the Soviet Arctic coast, to transport strategic metal ores from Scandinavia to Germany, and to sustain troops on the northern flank of the Eastern Front. Soviet convoys hugged the coast to avoid ice, while German convoys used fjords to evade Royal Navy patrols. Both sides engaged in minelaying and minesweeping of these shallow, confined routes – vulnerable to mine warfare and to submarine ambushes. Minesweepers and submarine chasers typically screened German convoys, while Soviet convoys were often protected by minesweeping trawlers and torpedo cutters.

A branch of the Pacific Route began carrying Lend-Lease goods through the Bering Strait to the Soviet Arctic coast in June 1942. The number of westbound cargo-ship voyages along this route was 23 in 1942, 32 in 1943, 34 in 1944 and 31 after Germany surrendered in May 1945. Westbound tonnage through the Bering Strait totaled approximately 10% of North American wartime goods sent to Soviet Arctic ports. A large portion of tonnage though the Bering Strait was fuel for Siberian airfields on the Alaska-Siberia air route.

== 1939 – Early conflict and Winter War ==
- 6 September 1939: Bremen was the first of 18 German merchant ships to take refuge in Murmansk after avoiding British naval patrols in the Atlantic.
- 30 November 1939: The Winter War offensive against Petsamo was supported by Soviet Northern Fleet destroyers Kuibishev, Karl Liebknecht and Grozny.

== 1940 – Invasion of Norway ==
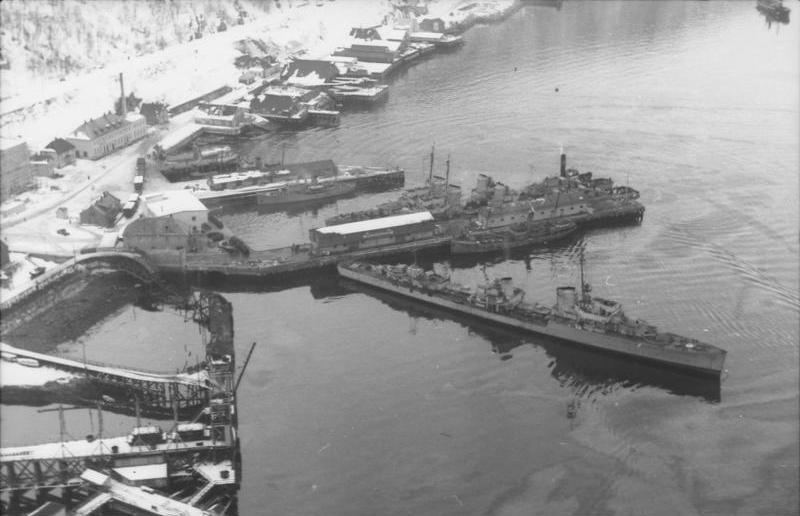
Destroyers Diether von Roeder and Wolfgang Zenker landing troops at Narvik

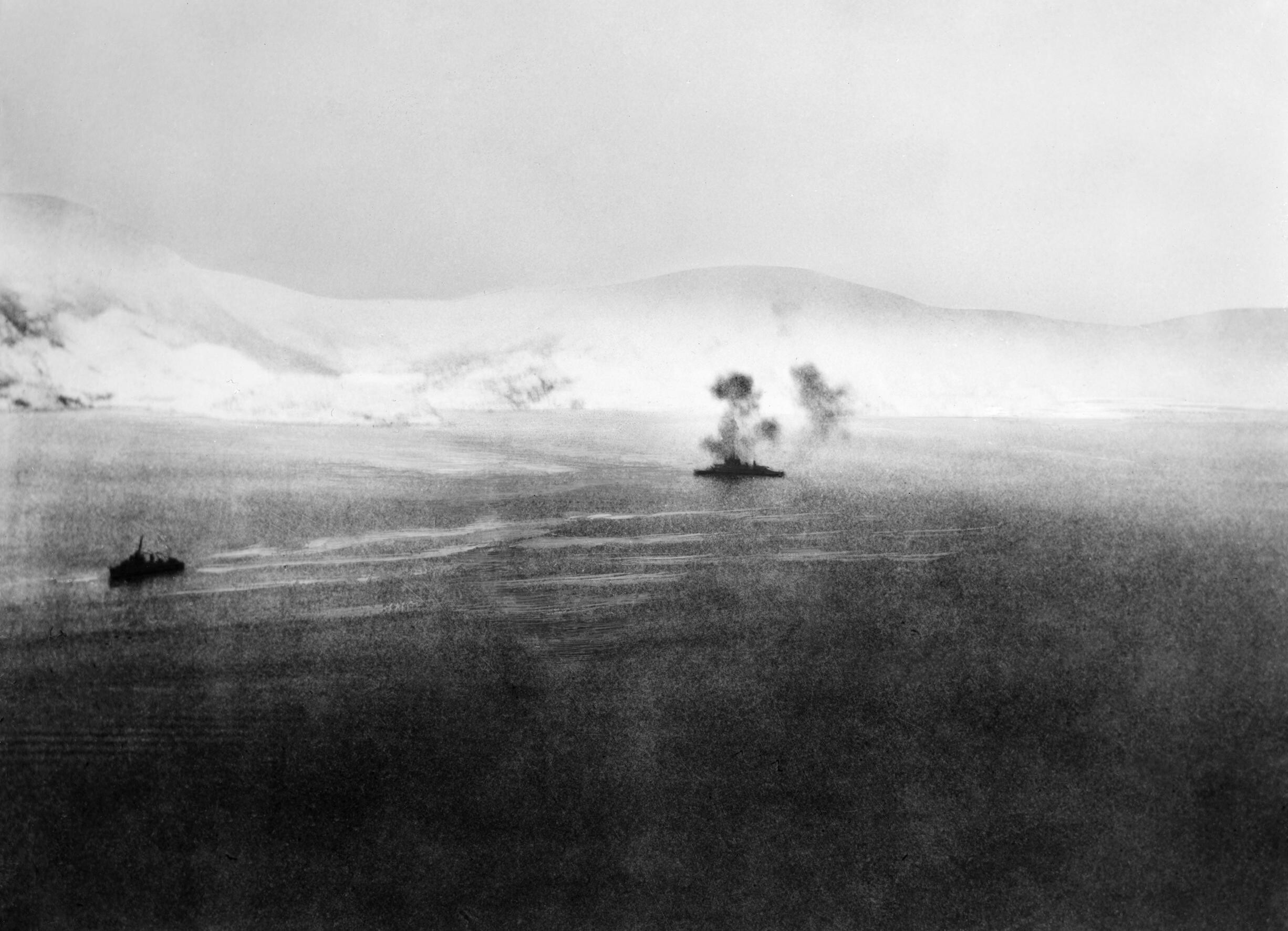
HMS Warspite supporting Allied troops at Narvik

- April 1940: Operation Weserübung included an invasion of Narvik by troops embarked aboard ten Kriegsmarine destroyers. Covering battleships Scharnhorst and Gneisenau briefly engaged HMS Renown; and subsequent battles of Narvik involved Norwegian coastal defence ships Eidsvold and Norge, U-boats, and units of the Royal Navy.
- 4 May 1940: The Polish destroyer Grom was sunk off Narvik by a KG 100 bomber.
- 21 May 1940: HMS Effingham was scuttled after grounding on a shallow pinnacle off Narvik.
- 4 June 1940: Operation Alphabet troopships Monarch of Bermuda, Batory, Sobieski, Franconia, Lancastria, Georgic, Oronsay, Ormonde, Arandora Star, Royal Ulsterman, Ulster Prince, Ulster Monarch and Duchess of York began evacuation of 24,600 Allied soldiers from Narvik.
- 8 June 1940: With some of the longest range naval gunnery hits ever documented, Scharnhorst and Gneisenau sank the British aircraft carrier HMS Glorious and her escorting destroyers HMS Acasta and Ardent during Operation Juno.
- 9 July 1940: Raider Komet sailed north from Bergen and waited near Novaya Zemlya until 13 August 1940 for ice conditions to allow passage through the Matochkin Strait into the Kara Sea. Komet proceeded east with the assistance of three Soviet icebreakers to enter the Pacific Ocean through the Bering Strait on 5 September 1940. Soviet submarine Shch-423 made a similar trip from Murmansk to Vladivostok from 5 August to 17 October.
- 25 July 1940: Admiral Hipper sailed for a two-week Arctic patrol.
- 15 August 1940: Army transport USAT American Legion departed Petsamo for New York City carrying American nationals from Finland, Estonia, Latvia, Lithuania, Sweden, Denmark, Norway, Germany and the Netherlands. American Legion also carried Princess Märtha of Sweden with her children, and a Bofors 40 mm gun manufactured in Sweden which became the prototype for American manufacture of the primary United States Navy anti-aircraft gun of World War II.
- 25 August 1940: HMS Norfolk and HMAS Australia sailed for a five-day patrol to Bear Island.
- 16 October 1940: HMS Furious launched an airstrike against the Tromsø seaplane base.

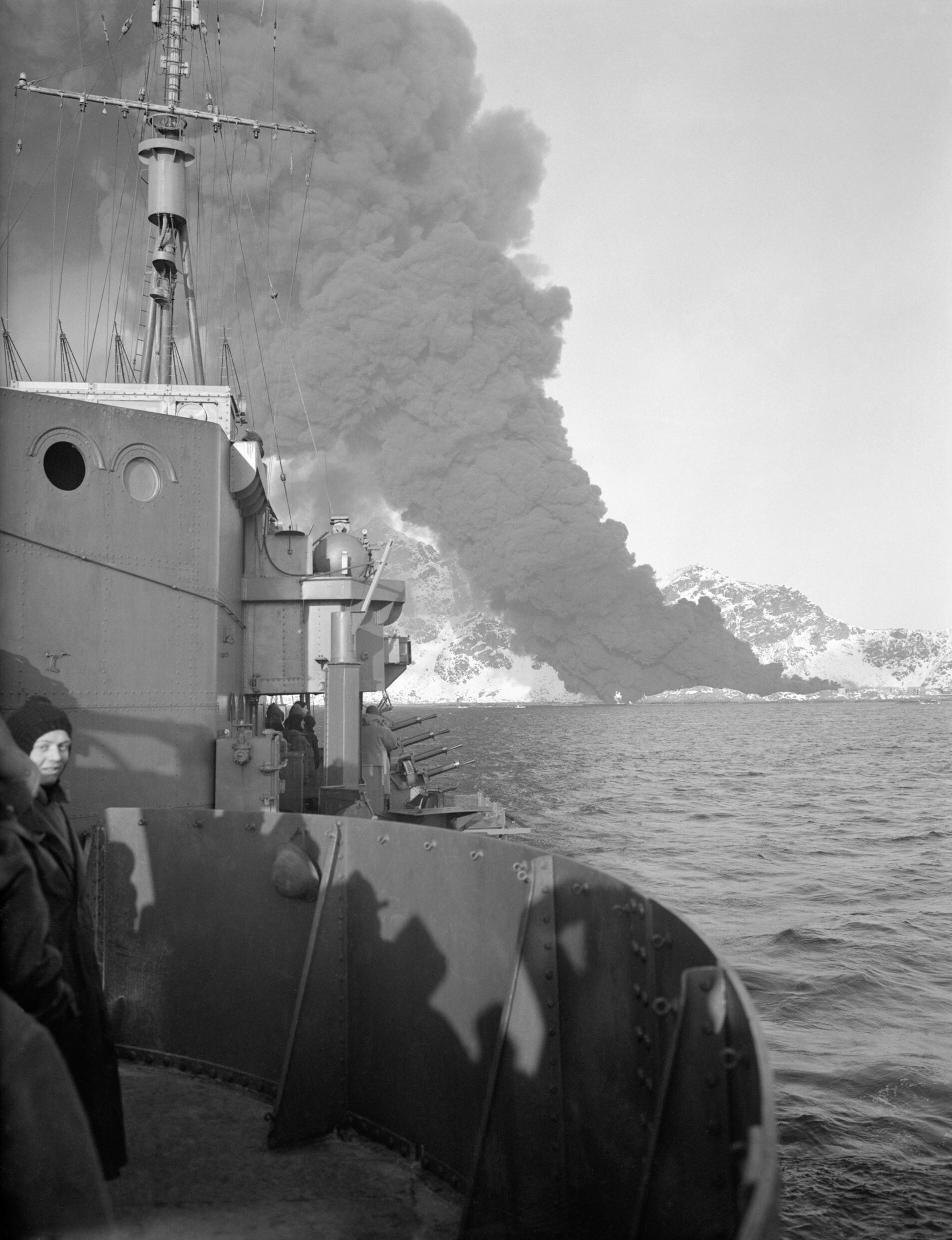
Burning fish oil tanks on Lofoten viewed from HMS Legion during Operation Claymore

- 4 March 1941: HMS Edinburgh and Nigeria covered the Operation Claymore raid on Lofoten.
- 11 April 1941: HNoMS Mansfield destroyed the Øksfjord fish oil factory.
- 7 May 1941: Destroyers HMS Somali, Bedouin, Eskimo and HMAS Nestor captured code documents aboard the German weather ship München near Jan Mayen while covered by cruisers HMS Edinburgh, Manchester and Birmingham. HMS Nigeria made a similar capture of the weather ship Lauenburg on 28 June.

== 1941 – Invasion of the Soviet Union ==
- 25 June 1941: The Soviet troopship Mossovet brought reinforcements to Titovka; and Soviet destroyers Kuibishev and Uritski landed additional reinforcements on 30 June.
- 1 July 1941: U-451 and U-652 are the first U-boats stationed in the Arctic.
- 12 July 1941: Kriegsmarine destroyers Richard Beitzen, Hermann Schoemann, Hans Lody, Friedrich Eckoldt and Karl Galster attacked a small Soviet convoy near Cape Teriberski.
- 14 July 1941: Soviet destroyers Gromky, Gremyashchy, Stremitleny and Kuibishev delayed a German infantry advance near Zapadnaya Litsa River.
- 20 July 1941: The Soviet destroyer Stremitleny was sunk in Kola Bay by a LG 1 Junkers Ju 87.
- 23 July 1941: Kriegsmarine destroyers Richard Beitzen, Hermann Schoemann, Friedrich Eckoldt and Karl Galster sank the Soviet survey ship Meridian near Teriberka.
- 30 July 1941: HMS Furious and Victorious launched airstrikes on Petsamo and Kirkenes. Victorious launched an airstrike on Tromsø on 31 July. These airstrikes turned back a patrol of Kriegsmarine destroyers.
- 31 July 1941: HMS Nigeria, Aurora, Punjabi and Tartar destroyed a weather station on Bear Island.
- August 1941: British submarines HMS Tigris and Trident were transferred to Murmansk.
- 10 August 1941: Kriegsmarine destroyers Z4 Richard Beitzen, Z10 Hans Lody, and Z16 Friedrich Eckoldt sank the Soviet patrol ship Tuman near Kola Bay. U-451 sank Soviet patrol vessel Zhemchug in the White Sea entrance.
- 19 August 1941: Troopship Empress of Canada sailed from Scapa Flow with HMS Aurora, Nigeria, Icarus, Antelope and Anthony to evacuate Soviet and Norwegian residents following destruction of Spitsbergen coal mines by Operation Gauntlet. The warships encountered a German troop convoy off Porsangerfjorden and sank the escort Bremse on 6 September.
- 26 August 1941: U-571 sank 3870-ton Mariya Ulyanova.
- 31 August 1941: The Dervish Convoy arrived in Arkhangelsk initiating transport of Allied war materials around Norway to the Soviet Union. The convoy was escorted by HMS Devonshire, Suffolk and Victorious, which launched airstrikes against Tromsø.
- 12 September 1941: Soviet submarine Shch-422 sank 1459-ton Ottar Jarl off Tanafjord.
- 27 September 1941: Max Aitken, Lord Beaverbrook and W. Averell Harriman arrived in Arkhangelsk aboard HMS London.
- 7 October 1941: HMS Victorious launched an airstrike against Vestfjorden.

== 1942 – PQ convoys ==
- 11 October 1941: Convoy PQ 1 escorted by HMS Suffolk arrived in Arkhangelsk.
- 17 October 1941: Soviet submarine Shch-402 sank the 682-ton Vesteraalen in Soroysundet.
- 18 October 1941: U-132 sank the 3487-ton Argun at the entrance to the White Sea.
- 30 October 1941: Convoy PQ 2 arrived in Arkhangelsk. Return convoy QP 2 departed on 2 November.
- 24 November 1941: HMS Kenya, Bedouin, Intrepid, and Soviet destroyers Gromky and Gremyashchy shell Vardø.
- 28 November 1941: Convoy PQ 3 and convoy PQ 4 arrived in Arkhangelsk. Return convoy QP 3 departed on 27 November.
- 3 December 1941: Soviet submarine K-3 was forced to surface after damages caused by German sub chasers UJ 1403, UJ 1416 and UJ 1708. Submarine engaged the Germans in gunfire battle and UJ 1708 was sunk, while the others retreated.
- 7 December 1941: Anthony Eden arrived in Murmansk aboard HMS Kent.
- 12 December 1941: Convoy PQ 5 arrived in Arkhangelsk.
- 21 December 1941: Soviet submarine M-174 sank the 4301-ton Emshorn off the Varangerfjord.
- 23 December 1941: Convoy PQ 6 arrived in Murmansk.
- 25 December 1941: U-134, U-454 and U-584 formed gruppe Ulan patrolling south of Bear Island for PQ convoys until 14 March 1942.
- 26 December 1941: HMS Arethusa covered the Operation Anklet raid on Lofoten.
- 11 January 1942: Convoy PQ 7 arrived in Murmansk after U-134 sank 5135-ton Waziristan.

Tirpitz waiting in Norway for another Allied convoy

- 14 January 1942: Soviet submarine S-102 sank 1877-ton Turkheim off Sytlefjord.
- 17 January 1942: U-454 damaged 5395-ton Harmatris and sank HMS Matabele from convoy PQ 8 as the convoy reached Kola Bay. The German battleship Tirpitz was based at Trondheim, where its presence required the Home Fleet to retain at least one modern battleship which might have otherwise been used in the Mediterranean or Pacific.
- 5 February 1942: Soviet submarine Shch-421 sank 2975-ton Konsul Schulte off Porsangerfjorden.
- 10 February 1942: Combined convoys PQ 9 and 10 arrived in Murmansk escorted by HMS Nigeria, Faulknor and Intrepid. The escort departed with return convoy QP 7 on 12 February.
- 15 February 1942: Soviet submarine S-101 sank 1147-ton Mimona off Tanafjord.
- 23 February 1942: Convoy PQ 11 arrived in Murmansk. Admiral Scheer joined Tirpitz in Trondheim.
- 5 March 1942: A Focke-Wulf Fw 200 located Convoy PQ 12 south of Jan Mayen. As part of Operation Sportpalast, Tirpitz sailed on 6 March with destroyers Hermann Schoemann, Friedrich Ihn and Z25. The convoy covering force of HMS Duke of York, Renown, Kenya, Faulknor, Eskimo, Punjabi, Fury, Echo and Eclipse failed to locate Tirpitz; and Ihn sank the 2815-ton Ijora straggling from convoy QP 8. An unsuccessful airstrike from HMS Victorious on 9 March caused Tirpitz to seek refuge in Narvik.
- 24 March 1942: Convoy QP 9 escort HMS Sharpshooter sank U-655.
- 27 March 1942: A Bv 138 located storm-scattered Convoy PQ 13 escorted by HMS Trinidad, Eclipse and Fury. KG 30 Junkers Ju 88s sank 4815-ton Raceland and 7007-ton Empire Ranger as Kriegsmarine destroyers Z24, Z25 and Z26 sailed. Z26 sank 4687-ton Bateau before being sunk by Trinidad. Trinidad and Eclipse were damaged in the engagement. U-376 sank 5086-ton Induna, and U-435 sank 6421-ton Effingham.
- 1 April 1942: Soviet submarine Shch-404 sank 2318-ton Michael off Tanafjord.
- 10 April 1942: Convoy QP 10 departed Kola Bay escorted by HMS Liverpool, Oribi, Punjabi, Marne, Fury and Eclipse. KG 30 Ju 88s sank 7164-ton Empire Cowper and 5486-ton Harpalion. U-435 sank 6008-ton Occidente and 5823-ton Kiev.
- 19 April 1942: Convoy PQ 14 arrived in Murmansk after U-403 sank 6985-ton Empire Howard.
- 24 April 1942: Soviet submarine Shch-401 was lost after sinking 1359-ton Stensaas.

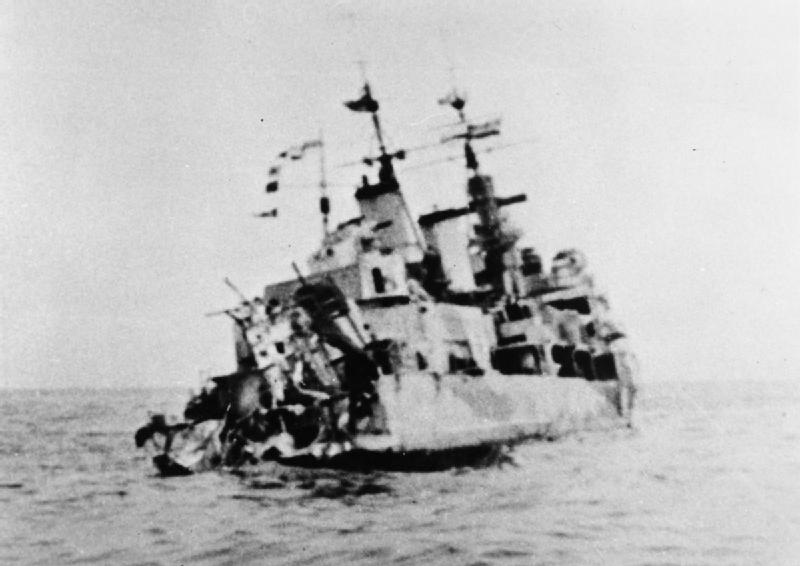
HMS Edinburgh during the battle for convoy QP 11

- 28 April 1942: Convoy QP 11 departed Murmansk escorted by HMS Edinburgh, Foresight, Forester, Bulldog, Amazon, Beagle and Beverley. U-456 torpedoed Edinburgh. Kriegsmarine destroyers Hermann Schoemann, Z24 and Z25 sank 2847-ton Tsiolkovski and damaged Amazon. Schoemann was sunk by Edinburgh while the German destroyers crippled Edinburgh and damaged Forester and Foresight.
- 29 April 1942: Soviet submarine M-171 sank 4969-ton Curityba off Varangerfjord.
- 5 May 1942: Convoy PQ 15 arrived in Murmansk after KG 26 Heinkel He 111s sank 5848-ton Botavon and 3807-ton Cape Corso and damaged 6153-ton Jutland which was then sunk by U-251. St Albans of the convoy escort accidentally sank supporting Polish submarine ORP Jastrząb. In the covering force, King George V collided with Punjabi, and exploding depth charges on the sinking destroyer damaged the battleship.

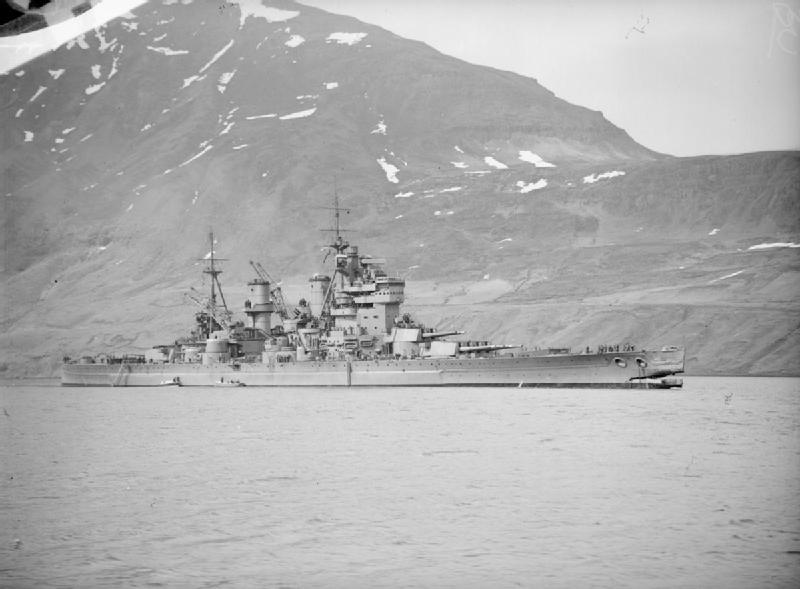
HMS King George V with bow damage from collision with HMS Punjabi

- 10 May 1942: Scheer moved from Trondheim to Narvik.
- 14 May 1942: A KG 30 Ju 88 dive bomber sank HMS Trinidad.
- 15 May 1942: The 11th U-boat Flotilla was established and based at Bergen for Arctic Ocean patrols. Sturzkampfgeschwader 5 (StG 5) Ju 87s attacked Murmansk, damaging 6187-ton Yaka and Soviet submarine Shch-403.
- 25 May 1942: Lützow joined Admiral Scheer in Narvik. KG 26 and KG 30 damaged 5127-ton Carlton from Convoy PQ 16, and U-703 sank 6191-ton Syros. Continuing aircraft attacks sank Alamar, Mormacsul, Empire Lawrence, Empire Purcell, Lowther Castle, and City of Joliet and damaged Stary Bolshevik, Ocean Voice, Empire Baffin, and HMS Garland before the convoy reached Murmansk on 31 May.
- 1 June 1942: StG 5 Ju 87s sank 7850-ton Empire Starlight and damaged Soviet submarine Shch-404 in Murmansk.
- 24 June 1942: A StG 5 Ju 87 sank HMS Gossamer in Kola Bay.

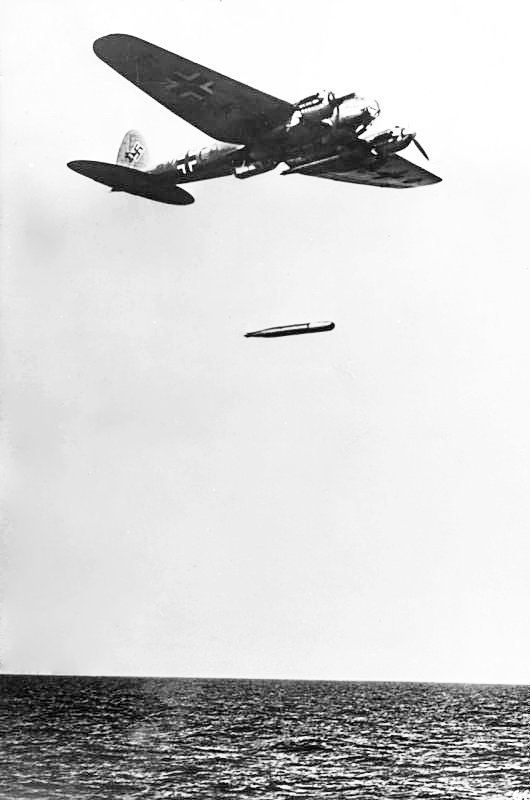
KG 26 He 111 torpedo planes attacked convoys PQ 15, 16 and 17.

- June 1942: Shiploads of strategic materials begin moving westbound from North America through the Bering Strait over the Northern Sea Route taking advantage of Soviet neutrality in the Pacific War to augment supplies delivered by PQ convoys.
- 4 July 1942: A He 115 sank Liberty ship Christopher Newport from convoy PQ 17; and KG 26 He 111s sank 4841-ton Navarino and damaged Liberty ship William Hooper and 6114-ton Azerbaidzhan. Twenty-two more ships were sunk by aircraft and U-boats after the convoy scattered on 5 July to avoid attacks by German surface ships.

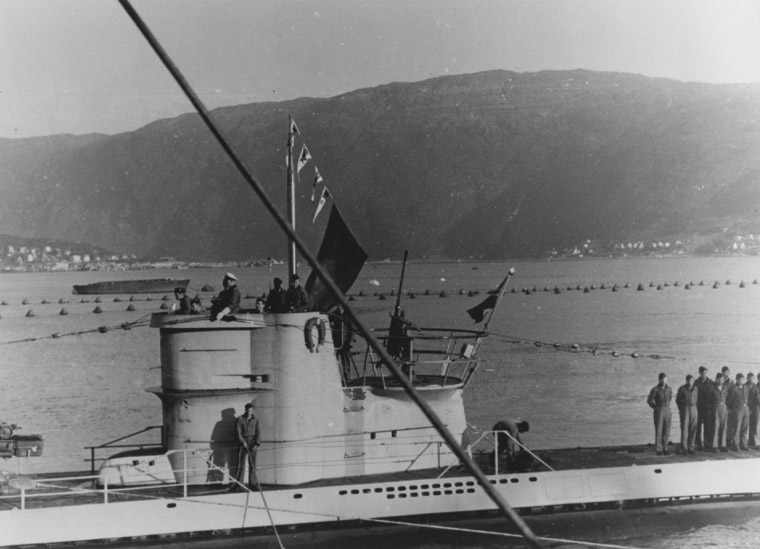
U-255, painted white for arctic camouflage, returning to base after attacking convoy PQ 17

- 30 July 1942: Soviet Pacific Fleet destroyers Razumny, Razyaryonny and Baku entered the Bering Strait and traveled west to reach the Soviet Northern Fleet on 14 October.
- 1 August 1942: U-601 sank 2513-ton Krestyanin off the Kostin Strait.
- 16 August 1942: Scheer left Narvik for the Operation Wunderland two-week patrol of the Kara Sea.
- 25 August 1942: HMS Marne, HMS Martin and HMS Onslaught sank the German minelayer Ulm east of Bear Island.
- 12 September 1942: Convoy PQ 18 escort HMS Faulknor sank U-88 near Bear Island. U-405 and U-589 sank Liberty ship Oliver Ellsworth and 3559-ton Stalingrad on 13 September; while KG 26 and KG 30 bombers sank 5432-ton Wacosta, 4826-ton Oregonian, 6131-ton Macbeth, 5441-ton Africander, 6209-ton Empire Stevenson, 7044-ton Empire Beaumont and 3124-ton Sukhona. U-457 sank 8992-ton Atheltemplar on 14 September; and HMS Onslow sank U-589. HMS Impulsive sank U-457 on 16 September. The 5446-ton Kentucky was sunk and 6458-ton Troubador damaged before the convoy reached Murmansk.
- 13 September 1942: Convoy QP 14 sailed from Arkhangelsk. On 20 September U-435 sank HMS Leda, U-255 sank 4937-ton Silver Sword, and U-703 sank HMS Somali. U-435 sank 5345-ton Bellingham, 7174-ton Ocean Voice and 3313-ton Grey Ranger on 22 September.
- 29 October 1942: Operation FB attempted independent routing of Allied merchant ships. U-586 sank 6640-ton Empire Gilbert on 2 November. KG 30 Ju 88s sank 7363-ton Dekabrist and damaged Liberty ship William Clark and 5445-ton Chulmleigh which were sunk by U-354 and U-625. U-625 also sank 7455-ton Empire Sky; and Z27 sank 7925-ton Donbass on 7 November.
- 5 November 1942: VP-84 Consolidated PBY Catalina H sank U-408 north of Iceland.
- 17 November 1942: Convoy QP 15 departed Kola Bay. A storm dispersed the convoy and sank escorting Soviet destroyer Sokrushitelny on 22 November. U-625 sank 5851-ton Goolistan, and U-601 sank 3974-ton Kuznets Lesov.

== 1943 – JW convoys ==
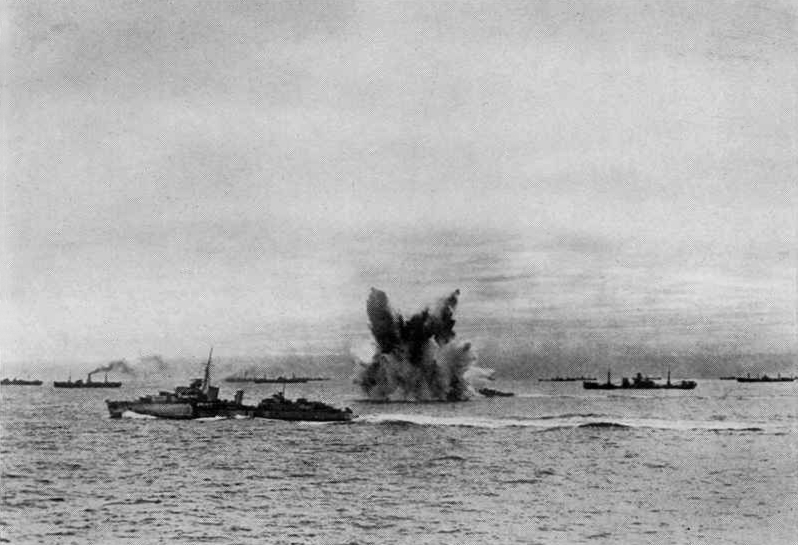
Convoy PQ 18 under attack by KG 30

- 31 December 1942: Admiral Hipper, Lützow, Richard Beitzen, Theodor Riedel, Friedrich Eckoldt, Z29, Z30 and Z31 attacked convoy JW 51B in the battle of the Barents Sea. The German ships damaged HMS Obdurate, Obedient and Onslow and sank HMS Achates and Bramble, before the covering force arrived to damage Hipper and sink Friedrich Eckoldt.
- 1 January 1943: Soviet submarine L-20 sank 5472-ton Muansa off Kongsfjorden. U-354 sank 2418-ton Krasnyj Partizan.
- 29 January 1943: Soviet submarines L-20 sank 7007-ton Othmarschen off Cape Nordkinn and M-171 sank 3243-ton Ilona Siemers off Kongsfjorden. U-255 sank the Soviet icebreaker Malygin and 1892-ton Ufa. U-255 then sank 7460-ton Greylock from convoy RA 52 on 3 February.
- 12 February 1943: Soviet submarine K-3 sank 8116-ton Fechenheim.
- 26 February 1943: Convoy JW 53 arrived in Kola Bay with one ship damaged by KG 30 Ju 88s. StG 5 Ju 87s damaged three more ships from the convoy on 27 and 28 February; air attacks on 6 and 13 March damaged another ship and sank 7173-ton Ocean Freedom.
- 5 March 1943: U-255 sank Liberty ship Richard Bland and 4978-ton Executive from convoy RA 53. U-586 sank 6076-ton Puerto Rican on 9 March.
- 11 March 1943: The German weather station Holzauge at Hansa Bay stationed on the northern coast of Sabine Island was discovered by the Sirius Dog Sled Patrol. The Germans realized they had been discovered, and gave chase, forcing the patrol to abandon their equipment and run back to Eskimonæs.
- 12 March 1943: Tipitz, Scharnhorst and Lützow assembled in Narvik causing cancellation of Allied convoys through the summer.
- 16 March 1943: Soviet submarine M-122 sank 4533-ton Johannisberger off Varangerfjord.
- 29 March 1943: Soviet submarine S-55 sank 2297-ton Ajax. Also S-101 is said to have sunk her.
- 7 April 1943: HMS Tuna sank U-644 near Jan Mayen.
- 29 April 1943: Soviet submarine S-55 sank 708-ton Sturzsee off Nordkyn
- 17 May 1943: Soviet submarine S-56 sank tanker 1118-ton Eurostadt off Kongsfjord. 3676-ton Wartheland was lightly damaged by dud hit from the same salvo.
- June 1943: The 13th U-boat Flotilla was established at Trondheim to reduce U-boat losses to Allied bombers patrolling approaches to U-boat bases on the French Atlantic coast.
- 8 July 1943: HMS Duke of York, Anson, Malaya, and Furious of the Home Fleet with USS South Dakota, Alabama, Augusta and Tuscaloosa conducted exercises off Norway intended to divert attention from Operation Husky.
- 17 July 1943: Soviet submarine S-56 sank minesweeper M-346.
- July–September 1943: German U-boats operated in Kara Sea against Soviet shipping: U-255 operated near Novaya Zemlya as a refueling station for a BV 138. The BV 138 searched for Kara Sea convoys to be attacked by Lützow and the Wiking Gruppe of U-302, U-354 and U-711. The U-boats torpedoed 3771-ton Petrovski and sank 2900-ton Dikson, 7169-tons Tbilisi, 2480-tons Arkhangel´sk and 4169-tons Sergej Kirov in addition to 3 minesweepers and 3 other auxiliary vessels. However U-639 was lost after being intercepted and torpedoed by Soviet submarine S-101 .
- 8 September 1943: Scharnhorst, Tirpitz and ten destroyers bombarded Spitsbergen as Operation Zitronella.
- 23 September 1943: Tirpitz was immobilized in Kåfjord by Operation Source.

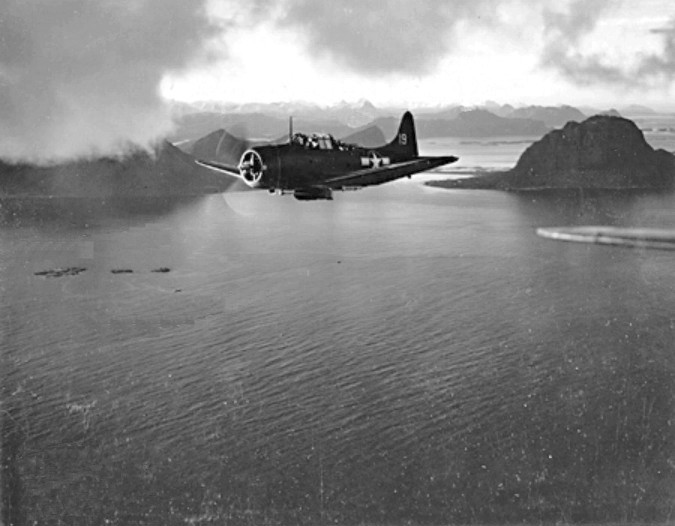
SBD Dauntless dive bomber from USS Ranger during the Bodø airstrike

- 4 October 1943: USS Ranger launched an airstrike on Bodø as Operation Leader.
- 12 October 1943: Soviet submarine S-55 sank 5381-ton Ammerland off Porsangerfjord.
- 26 December 1943: Scharnhorst was sunk during the battle of the North Cape while attempting to engage convoys JW 55B and RA 55A.
- 26 January 1944: Isegrim gruppe U-boats damaged HMS Obdurate and sank Liberty ships Penelope Barker, Andrew G. Curtin and Fort Bellingham from convoy JW 56A near Bear Island. On 30 January U-278 sank HMS Hardy with a G7es torpedo; and the convoy escort sank U-314.
- 28 January 1944: Soviet submarine S-56 sank 5056-ton Henrietta Schulte.
- 24 February 1944: HMS Furious of the convoy JW 57 covering force conducted Operation Bayleaf airstrikes against the Norwegian coast. Convoy escort HMS Keppel sank U-713. U-956 sank HMS Mahratta with a G7es torpedo on 25 February.
- 2 March 1944: HMS Sceptre sank an 8340-ton merchant ship in Folda fjord.
- 4 March 1944: U-703 sank 7062-ton Empire Tourist from convoy RA 57. No. 816 Naval Air Squadron Fairey Swordfish from escorting HMS Chaser sank U-472, U-366 and U-973.
- 28 March 1944: HMS Syrtis was sunk by a mine off Bodø.

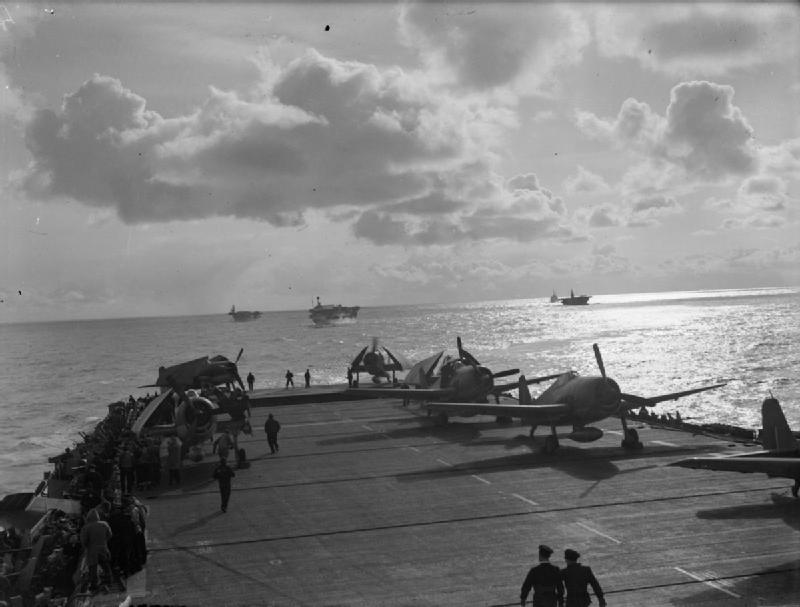
Aircraft carriers of Operation Tungsten preparing for an airstrike on Tirpitz.

- 2 April 1944: HMS Keppel sank U-360, and other convoy JW 58 escorts sank U-288.
- 3 April 1944: British carrier aircraft damage Tirpitz during Operation Tungsten.
- 30 April 1944: U-711 sank Liberty ship William S. Thayer from convoy RA 59. Convoy escorts sank U-277, U-959 and U-674. The convoy covering force launched an airstrike sinking three ships from a German convoy near Bodø.
- 26 May 1944: Soviet aircraft sank 3402-ton Solviken and damaged 3672-ton Herta Engeline Fritzen near Kirkenes.
- 31 May 1944: HMS Milne sank U-289 southwest of Bear Island.

== 1944 and 1945 – Last operations ==
- 17 June 1944: Soviet aircraft sank 1,610-ton Dixie and damaged 1,112-ton Marga Cords and 7,419-ton Florianopolis from a convoy near Hammerfest.
- 17 July 1944: Unsuccessful British carrier attack on Tirpitz during Operation Mascot.
- 31 July 1944: Tirpitz completed battle damage repair at Altafjord.
- 17 August 1944: Soviet aircraft sank two merchant ships near Kirkenes.
- 19 August 1944: Soviet torpedo cutters sank 3,946-ton Colmar from a German convoy near Persfjord.
- 21 August 1944: U-344 sank convoy JW 59 escort HMS Kite, and was sunk by Swordfish of the covering force aircraft carrier HMS Victorious.
- 22–29 August: British carrier aircraft repeatedly attack Tirpitz during Operation Goodwood, but inflict only light damage. U-354 sank HMS Bickerton and damaged HMS Nabob from the British fleet before being sunk by escorts on 24 August.

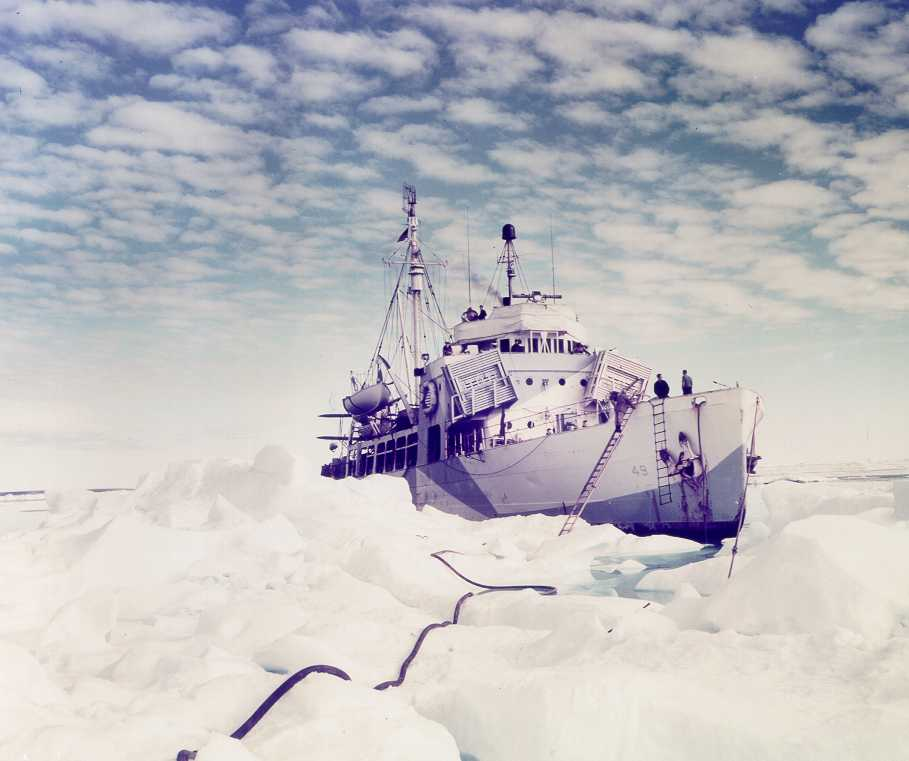
USCG cutter Northland operating off Greenland

- August–September 1944: German U-boat operations in Kara Sea against Soviet shipping resulted in the loss of three former American minesweepers of the Admirable-class transferred to the Soviets under Lend-Lease: T-118, T-114 and T-120 in addition to the Soviet corvette Brilliant. However, only one merchant was lost: 7540-tons Marina Raskova (7540 GRT), in addition to a survey vessel. Germans lost U-362 after depth charges by Soviet minesweeper T-116 (another Admirable-class vessel transferred from United States).
- 1 September 1944: The German weather ship Kehdingen scuttled off Greenland when found by USCGC Northland.
- 2 September 1944: Convoy RA 59 escorts sank U-394.
- 16 September 1944: Soviet aircraft sank 3668-ton Wolsum at Kirkenes. Another attack damaged 5434-ton Friesenland off North Cape on 20 September.
- 29 September 1944: U-310 sank 7219-ton Samsuva and Liberty ship Edward H. Crockett from convoy RA 60. No. 813 Naval Air Squadron Swordfish F of HMS Campania sank U-921 on 30 September.
- 11 October 1944: Soviet torpedo cutters sank German minesweeper M-303 off Kiberg.
- 12 October 1944: Soviet submarine S-104 sank 1730-ton Lumme east of Tanafjord.
- 16 October 1944: United States Coast Guard icebreaker Eastwind captured the German weather ship Externsteine off Greenland.
- 21 October 1944: Soviet torpedo cutters sank German minesweeper M-31 off Honningsvåg.

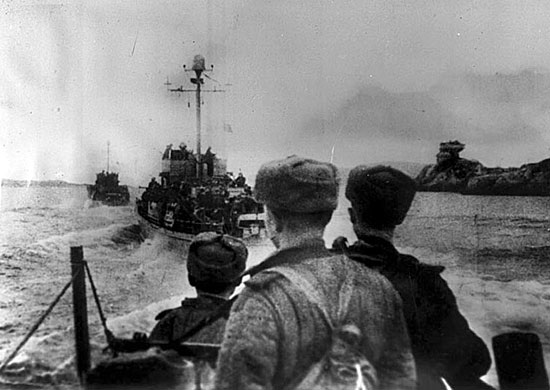
Soviet Northern Fleet ships carrying landing parties for the Petsamo–Kirkenes Offensive

- 26 October 1944: Soviet naval infantry captured Kirkenes with the support of Soviet Northern Fleet destroyers and smaller warships.
- 2 November 1944: U-295 damaged convoy RA 61 escort HMS Mounsey with a G7se torpedo. HMS Venturer sank U-771 off Lofoten on 11 November.
- 12 November 1944: Operation Catechism: Tirpitz was attacked and subsequently capsized after an attack by Royal Air Force Avro Lancasters.
- 2 December 1944: U-363 sank 1123-ton Proletari off Finland.
- 9 December 1944: Convoy RA 62 escorts sank U-387 at the mouth of Kola Bay. U-365 torpedoed HMS Cassandra on 11 December before being sunk by No. 813 Naval Air Squadron Swordfish from HMS Campania on 13 December.
- 30 December 1944: U-956 torpedoed 7176-ton Tbilisi off Kola Bay.
- December 1944: The 14th U-boat Flotilla was established at Narvik to absorb displaced U-boats as bases on the French coast were captured by Allied troops.
- 16 January 1945: U-997 sank Dejatelnyj with a G7se torpedo at the mouth of Kola Bay.
- 13 February 1945: KG 26 Ju 88 and 188 torpedo bombers withdrawn from France following the Normandy landings made unsuccessful attacks against convoy JW 64. U-992 sank convoy escort HMS Denbigh Castle at the mouth of Kola Bay.
- 14 February 1945: U-boats sank 8129-ton Norfjell and Liberty ship Horace Gray from convoy BK 3 outside Kola Bay.
- 17 February 1945: Escorts clearing Kola Bay for the departure of convoy RA 64 sank U-425. U-711 sank HMS Bluebell and U-968 damaged Liberty ship Thomas Scott and HMS Lark with G7se torpedoes. On 23 February KG 26 sank Liberty ship Henry Bacon – the last ship to be sunk by German aircraft in the second world war.
- 20 March 1945: U-968 torpedoed Liberty ships Horace Bushnell and Thomas Donaldson from convoy JW 65 and convoy escort HMS Lapwing with a G7se torpedo.
- 22 April 1945: U-997 sank 1603-ton Onega and torpedoed 4287-ton Idefjord from convoy PK 9.
- 29 April 1945: In the last trade convoy battle of the Second World War, U-286 sank HMS Goodall at the mouth of Kola Bay as convoy JW 66 escorts sank U-307 and U-286.
- 8 May 1945: Supply ships from the United States continue westbound through the Bering Strait along the Northern Sea Route to encourage the Soviet Union to declare war on Japan on 9 August 1945.
