= Kara Sea U-boat campaign =

- Part of the Arctic campaign of the Second World War
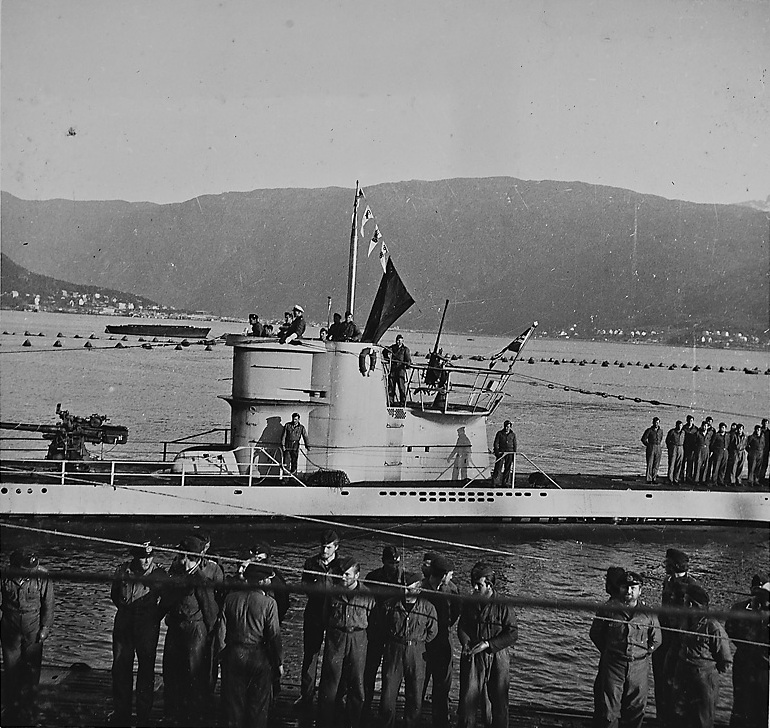
- U-255 at Narvik
Date	1 August 1943 – 4 October 1944
Location	Kara Sea
Result	Indecisive

Belligerents
Germany	Soviet Union

Strength
6 U-boats (1943)	Anti-submarine warfare ships

Casualties and losses
2 U-boats sunk	1 corvette sunk; 6 minesweepers sunk; 5 merchant ships sunk; 1 merchant ship damaged; 2 survey vessels sunk; 1 salvage ship sunk; 1 motorboat sunk

The Kara Sea U-boat campaign was a German submarine operation in the Arctic waters of the Kara Sea during the Second World War. The plan was to repeat Operation Wunderland (16–30 August 1942) in Operation Husar. The Deutschland-class cruiser Lützow was to sortie into the Kara Sea with U-boats in support, to attack Soviet ships.

== Background ==
Unternehmen Wunderland (Operation Wonderland) was a raid by the Deutschland-class cruiser Admiral Scheer and several U-boats into the Kara Sea in 1942, which was a modest German success. A similar operation, Unternehmen Wunderland II, was planned for 1 August 1943 with the Deutschland-class cruiser Lützow but her participation was cancelled before the operation began.

== Operation Husar ==
By July 1943, plans for Operation Husar (Unternehmen Husar) had been laid, a repeat of Operation Wunderland (16–30 August 1942) when Admiral Scheer and several U-Boats had conducted a raid in the Kara Sea. Four U-boats were to be sent into the Kara Sea in support of a raid by Lützow. This was later limited to U-711 and U-354 with U-622 which carried Kenntmann, a party of B-Dienst wireless interception experts, to eavesdrop on Soviet wireless transmissions. The boats were a reconnaissance force for the cruiser and were intended to make Soviet ships sail closer to the coast, where they would be more vulnerable to the guns of Lützow. A Blohm & Voss BV 138 flying boat was included for reconnaissance, after tests of refuelling equipment on U-601 with the BV 138 conducted in Altafjord were a success, U-255 also being equipped with the refuelling gear. The aircraft was to reconnoitre the area as far as the Vilkitsky Strait, between Severnaya Zemlya and Cape Chelyuskin at the boundary of the Kara Sea and the Laptev Sea, checking the extent of sea ice and looking for Soviet ships.

Diagram of the Vilkitsky Strait

With few ships to attack, torpedoes were less effective than mines; the Type VIIC U-boat could lay TMB (torpedo mine type B), three of which could be carried in a torpedo tube and laid on the sea bed. TMB were magnetic mines with 1,280 lb (580 kg) of explosive detonated by the metallic hull of a ship passing overhead; later an acoustic trigger was produced. The larger TMC mines contained 2,200 lb (1,000 kg) of explosive and two could be carried per torpedo tube. In Operation Nelke U-625 mined the west end of the Yugorsky Strait on 20 July with twenty-four TMB mines. Five days later the Soviet minesweeper T-904 was sunk by a mine. On 27 July 1943, en route for the Kara Sea, U-255 sank the Soviet survey ship Akademik Shokalskij (300 GRT). On 1 August the U-boat crew set up a base close to Spory Navolok on the north-east coast of Novaya Zemlya and on 4 August refuelled a BV 138 flying-boat which on 5, 6, 7 and 11 August flew reconnaissance sorties up to the Vilkitsky Strait, ready for operations by Wolfpack Wiking against Soviet shipping by the three U-boats and by Lutzow, which was waiting in Altafjord. With nothing found, another operation supported by U-255 and U-601 was mounted from 4 to 6 September with the same result.

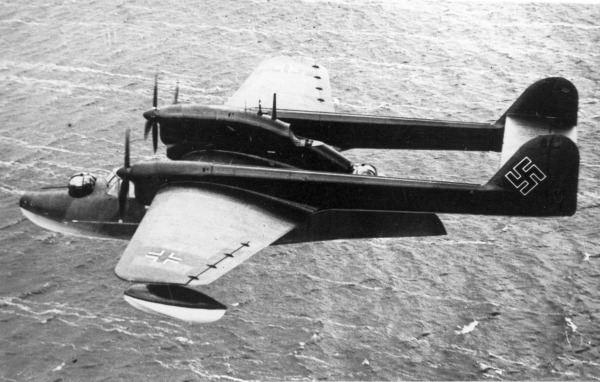
Example of a Bv 138 flying boat

- On 30 July 1043, U-703 sank the Soviet minesweeper T-911 off the Kostin Strait.
- On 5 August 1943, the Soviet motorboat Majakovski [80 long tons (81 t)] sank after being mined by U-212.
- On 21 August, U-354 found a convoy off Port Dikson sailing eastwards, followed it and on 27 August attacked the convoy in the western Siberian Sea, damaging the Soviet merchant ship Petrovskij (3,771 GRT) with a torpedo. On the next day, U-302 sank the merchant ship Dikson (2,920 GRT).
- On 25 August 1943, the Soviet salvage ship ASO-1 Shkval sunk on a mine laid by U-625.

On 28 August, the Soviet submarine S-101 intercepted and sank U-639 (the only German loss of the 1943 campaign).

- On 6 September 1943, the Soviet merchantman Tbilisi (7,169 GRT) with a cargo of coal, was sunk by a mine laid by U-636.
- On 30 September 1943, U-960 sunk the Soviet freighter Arkhangel'sk (2,480 GRT) with a cargo of machinery equipment, part of Convoy VA-18.
- On 1 October 1943, U-960 attacked convoy VA-18 again, sinking the minesweeper T-896. U-703 also attacked the convoy, sinking the freighter Sergej Kirov (4,146 GRT) with a cargo of machinery equipment.

== 1944 ==
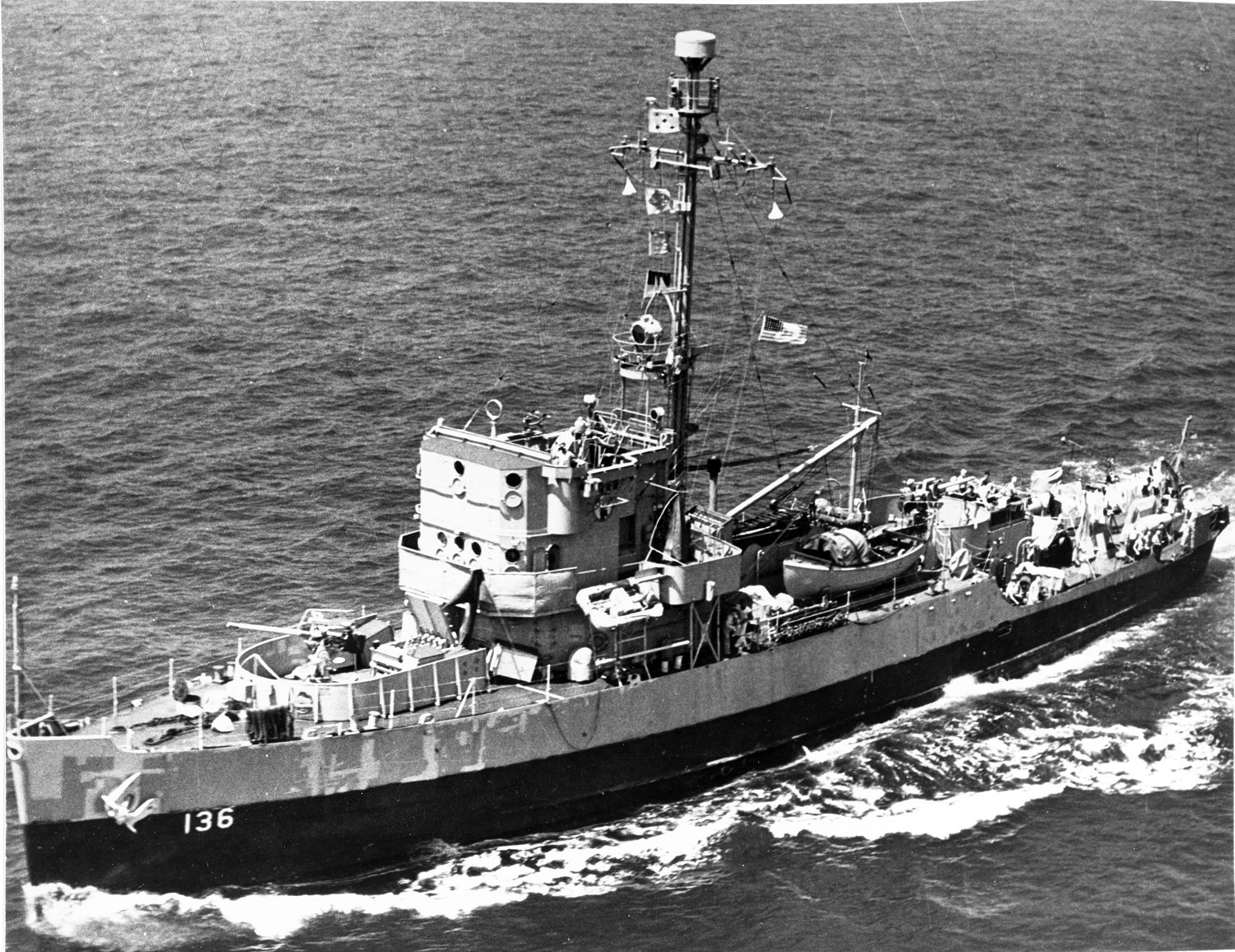
USS Admirable, lead-ship of her class, used by Soviet Navy in this campaign

Despite the official end of Wunderland II on 4 October 1943, operations in Kara Sea resumed in 1944 until 4 October.

- On 12 August 1944, U-365 attacked the Soviet Convoy BD-5: she sank in succession the minesweepers T-118, T-114 and finally the merchant Marina Raskova (7540 GRT). Of 632 men from the ships, only 186 were saved by minesweeper T-116 and 73 by MBR-2 flying boats.
- On 26 August 1944, U-957 sank with gunfire the Soviet survey vessel Nord. The ship's gunners could fire only shell, without effect, before being sunk.
- On 5 September 1944, Soviet minesweeper T-116 depth charged and sank U-362.
- On 23 September 1944, U-957 attacked Convoy VD-1 sinking the corvette Brilliant.
- On 24 September 1944, U-739 attacked Convoy VD-1, sinking the minesweeper T-120.

== Aftermath ==
The German operations in the Kara Sea had no effect on Soviet industrial production and the Soviet shipping was only disrupted for a short time. The German operations managed to divert Soviet forces from the operations close Norway.
