= Haimar Wedemeyer =

German sailor

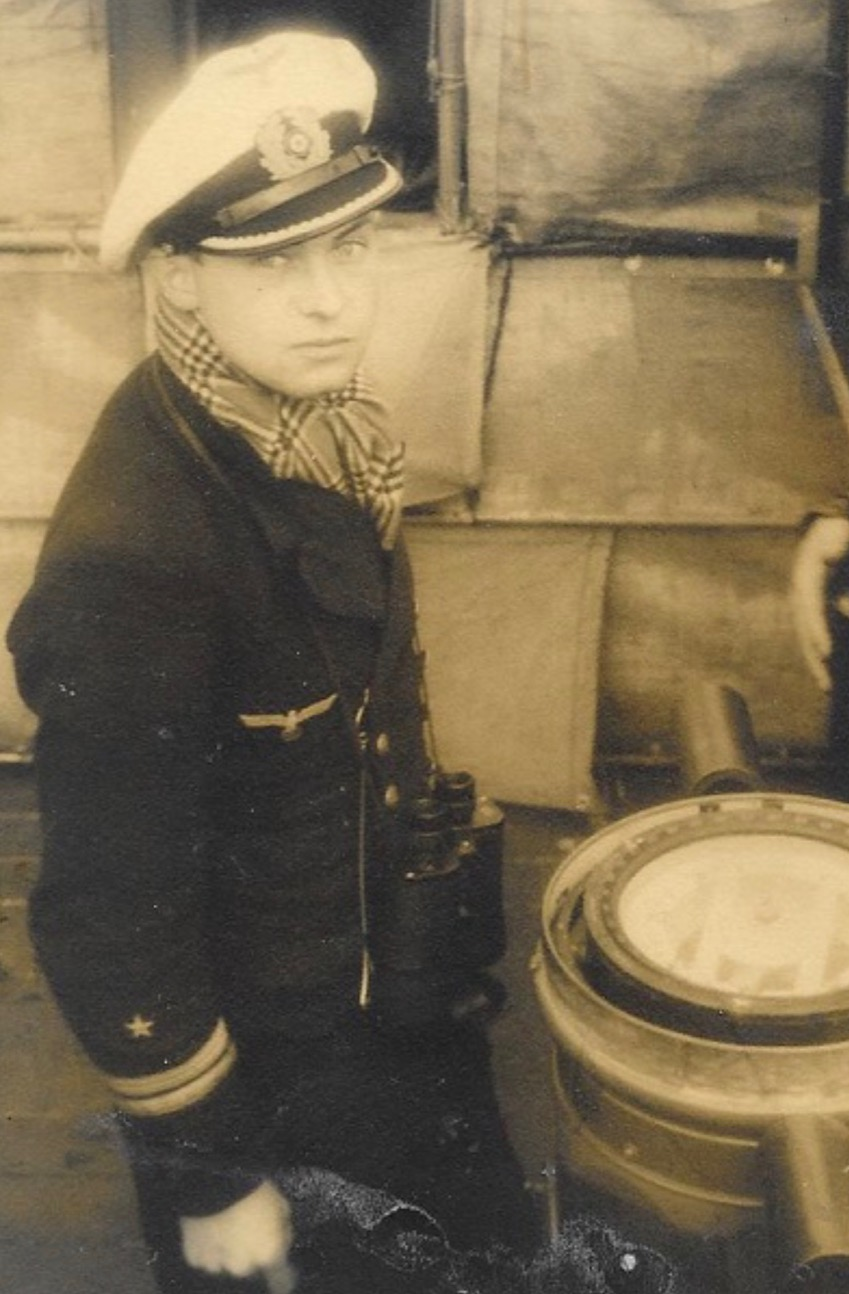
- Haimar Wedemeyer in 1943

Personal information
- Nationality: German
- Born: 22 September 1906; Marburg, German Empire
- Died: 13 November 1998 (aged 92); Hamburg, Germany

Haimar Wedemeyer (22 September 1906 – 13 November 1998) was a German sailor. He competed in the mixed 6 metres at the 1936 Summer Olympics.

== Personal life ==
Wedemeyer served as a kapitänleutnant in the Kriegsmarine during the Second World War. He commanded U-365 between 1943 and 1944, sinking three ships in five patrols.
