= 813 Naval Air Squadron =

Inactive flying squadron of the Royal Navy's Fleet Air Arm

- Squadron badge
- Active: Royal Air Force; 1937–1939; Royal Navy: 1939–1943; 1943–1945; 1945–1946; 1947–1955; 1956–1958
- Disbanded: 22 April 1958
- Country: United Kingdom
- Allegiance: Northwest African Coastal Air Force
- Branch: Royal Navy
- Type: Torpedo Bomber Reconnaissance squadron
- Role: Carrier-based: anti-submarine warfare (ASW); anti-surface warfare (ASuW)
- Part of: Fleet Air Arm
- Home station: See Naval air stations section for full list.
- Motto: Full sail
- Aircraft: See Aircraft flown section for full list.
- Engagements: World War II: Battle of Calabria; Battle of Taranto; Western Desert campaign; Malta convoys; Operation Torch; Operation Husky; Battle of the Atlantic; Arctic convoys of World War II
- Battle honours: Calabria 1940; Mediterranean 1940–41; Taranto 1940; Libya 1940–41; Malta Convoys 1942; North Africa 1942–43; Atlantic 1942–44; Arctic 1941–45

Insignia
- Squadron Badge Description: White, over three wavy blue an eagle displayed reversed black (1938)
- Identification Markings: 580–590 (Swordfish); E4A+ (Swordfish 13 July 1939); 4A+ (Swordfish later); single letters (Swordfish August 1943); GA+ (Swordfish on Campania September 1944); 6A+ (Sea Gladiator); Z1-Z8 (Wildcat on Campania); single letters (Wildcat on Vindex); FD1A+ (Firebrand T.F. 4); 100–123 (Firebrand T.F. 5); 181–192 (Wyvern); 121–129 (Wyvern May 1955); 300–301 (Wyvern November 1956); 270–279 (Wyvern)
- Fin Carrier/Shore Codes: FD:C:A (Firebrand T.F. 5); Z, J & E (Wyvern)

813 Naval Air Squadron (813 NAS), also referred to as 813 Squadron, is an inactive Fleet Air Arm (FAA) naval air squadron of the Royal Navy (RN). It most recently operated the Westland Wyvern S. 4 strike aircraft, between November 1956 and April 1958, with its last deployment on the Audacious-class aircraft carrier HMS Eagle, operating in both the Mediterranean and Atlantic.

It initially operated Fairey Swordfish from the aircraft carrier HMS Illustrious and took part in the successful raid on Taranto in November 1940. In July 1943, the squadron was a component of RAF Gibraltar but a detachment of its Swordfish (torpedo–spotter–reconnaissance) was based at Tafaraoui, Algeria and assigned to the Northwest African Coastal Air Force (NACAF) for Operation Husky.

From April 1944 the squadron, including a detachment of Grumman Wildcat and three Fairey Fulmar night fighters, were deployed on the escort carrier HMS Campania operating in the Arctic Ocean on convoy duty. On 13 December 1944 two 813 NAS Swordfish were responsible for the sinking of U-365 by depth charges.

Postwar, the squadron was tasked as a torpedo fighter unit, initially equipped with Blackburn Firebrand aircraft.

== History ==
=== Torpedo Spotter Reconnaissance squadron (1937–1943) ===
813 Naval Air Squadron was initially formed at RAF Gosport in Hampshire on 18 January 1937, designated as a Torpedo Spotter Reconnaissance squadron, it was equipped with a fleet of nine Fairey Swordfish biplane torpedo bombers. The squadron was embarked in HMS Eagle in Singapore, utilising RAF Seletar as a land-based support facility at the onset of the Second World War. The aircraft carrier and its assigned squadrons conducted operations to locate enemy vessels in the Indian Ocean.

The Admiralty formally assumed control of the squadron on 24 May 1939 while it was embarked in HMS Eagle. Following a refit, HMS Eagle departed for the Mediterranean, where in June, four Gloster Sea Gladiators, a biplane fighter aircraft, were incorporated into the squadron's strength. These aircraft swiftly achieved success by downing two Regia Aeronautica bombers, with additional aircraft being shot down in the subsequent months. In a raid on Tobruk, the Fairey Swordfish sank one destroyer, damaged another, and sank or put out of action three merchant ships. In a subsequent operation in Sicily, they sank another destroyer. Additionally four of its aircraft participated alongside HMS Illustrious in the Battle of Taranto during the night of 11/12 November 1940.

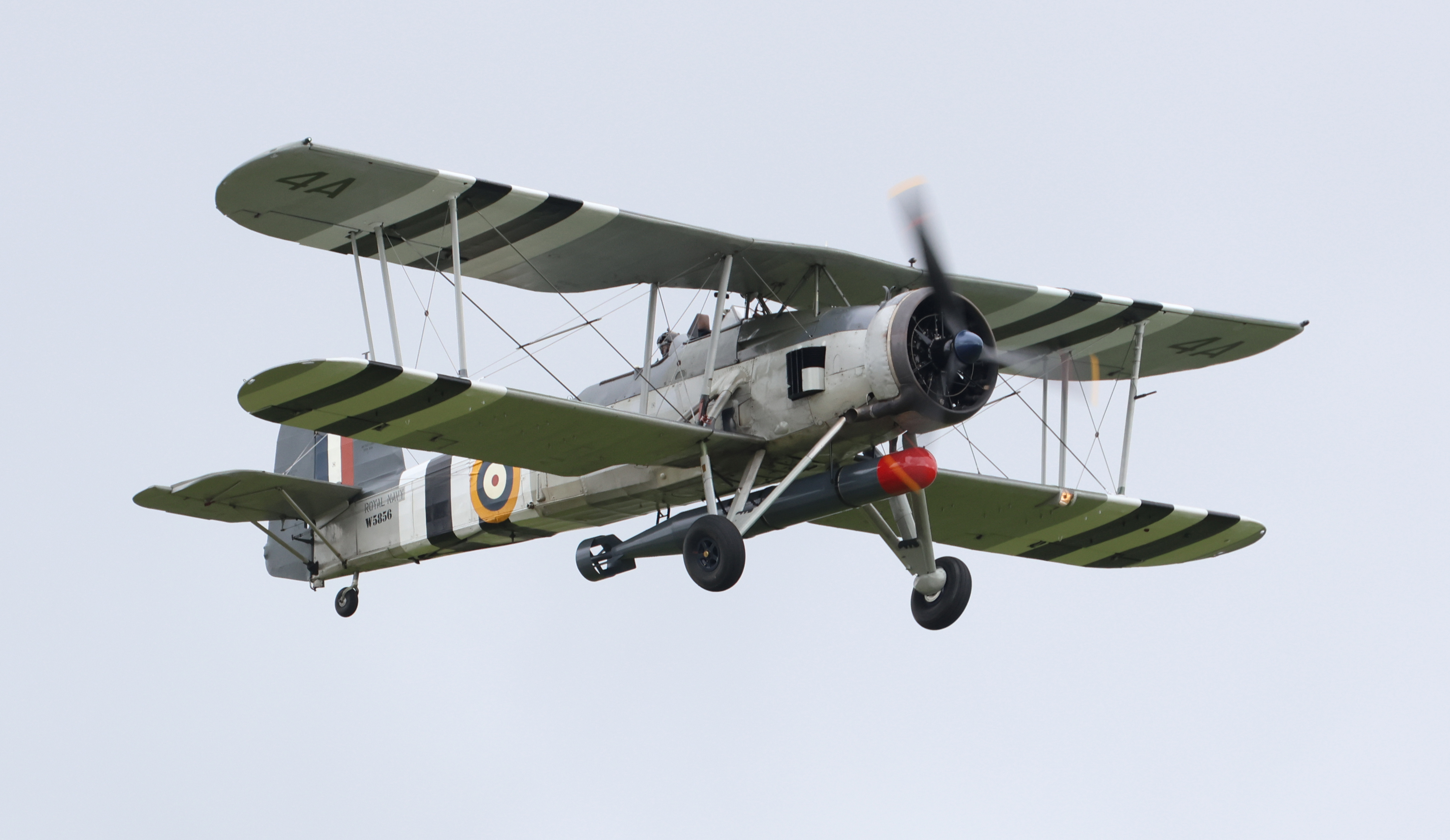
Fairey Swordfish; an example of the type used by 813 Squadron

In March 1941, the Gloster Sea Gladiators were withdrawn, with 813 Naval Air Squadron accompanying 824 Naval Air Squadron to Port Sudan to support local military operations. During this assignment, the squadron successfully engaged five Regia Marina destroyers located north of Massawa, resulting in the sinking of two vessels, the beaching of two others, and the subsequent scuttling of the remaining ship. After completing its mission, 813 Naval Air Squadron re-joined the carrier and proceeded to sail via Cape Town, spending some time in the Atlantic. On 6 June, it located and sank the U-boat supply ship Elbe, subsequently compelling the German tanker Lothringen to surrender.

Upon its return home in late October 1941, the squadron established a temporary base at RNAS Machrihanish (HMS Landrail), Argyll and Bute, Scotland. After a brief period, the squadron relocated to RNAS Lee-on-Solent (HMS Daedalus), on the south coast of England. Here the squadron was equipped with nine new Fairey Swordfish aircraft. Initially, the squadron was also provided with two Hawker Sea Hurricanes, a naval variant of the Hawker Hurricane fighter.

In January 1942, 813 Naval Air Squadron re-embarked in HMS Eagle and arrived in Gibraltar by late February, where it engaged in patrols and participated in various operations to transport aircraft to Malta alongside HMS Eagle and HMS Argus. The squadron was temporarily reduced to six aircraft and were fortuitously stationed on land in Gibraltar when HMS Eagle was sunk on 11 August, although four Hawker Sea Hurricanes that were on board were lost.

The squadron's capacity was increased twofold in a span of ten days, enabling it to provide assistance for the North African landings, including a flight assigned to Algeria. It maintained operations from both Gibraltar and Algeria until it was transported to the United Kingdom, where it was officially disbanded on 18 October 1943.

=== Torpedo Bomber Reconnaissance squadron (1943–1945) ===
In November 1943, 813 Naval Air Squadron was reformed at RNAS Donibristle (HMS Merlin), Fife, Scotland, incorporating nine new Fairey Swordfish II aircraft. Subsequently, in March 1944, three Fairey Fulmar night fighters were assigned to the squadron from 784 Naval Air Squadron. These aircraft, along with the Fairey Swordfish, were deployed aboard the escort carrier HMS Campania in April for the purpose of escorting convoys in the Atlantic and North Russian regions.

The squadron also operated four Grumman Wildcat, an American carrier-borne fighter aircraft, from 1832 Naval Air Squadron off HMS Campania. Engaging in operations within the North Atlantic and supporting Arctic convoys, the Fairy Swordfish successfully sank U-921 on 30 September and U-365 on 13 December while the Grumman Wildcat fighters were credited with the destruction of four Luftwaffe aircraft. In January 1945, a portion of the squadron returned to duty for anti-submarine missions along the Norwegian coastline. By March 1945, the transition to Fairey Swordfish Mk III was completed, coinciding with the withdrawal of the Fairey Fulmar aircraft and the introduction of eight new Grumman Wildcat Mk Vs into service. The squadron conducted its final Arctic convoy operation aboard another escort carrier HMS Vindex in April 1945, subsequently disbanding on 15 May 1945.

=== Firebrand (1945–1953) ===
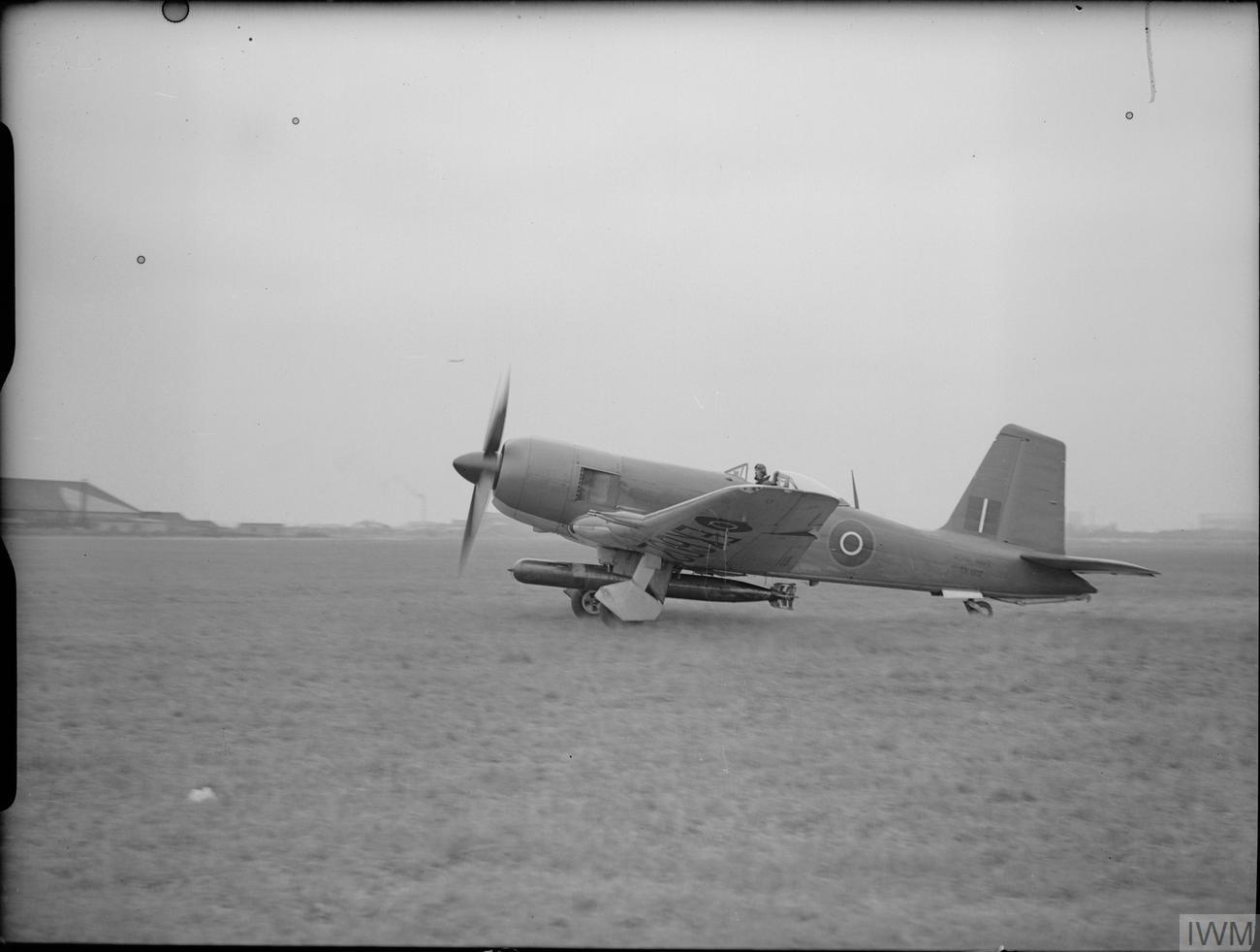
Blackburn Firebrand T.F. IV; an example of the type used by 813 Squadron

813 Naval Air Squadron was re-established at RNAS Ford (HMS Peregrine), West Sussex on 1 September 1945, functioning as a Torpedo Strike Squadron with the Blackburn Firebrand T.F. IV strike fighter as its primary aircraft. This variant encountered significant problems; it was the inaugural model designed to serve as a fighter, dive-bomber and torpedo strike aircraft, however, it suffered from numerous complications, preventing the squadron from achieving operational status. the squadron was disbanded at RNAS Ford on 30 September 1946, just over a year after its formation.

The Blackburn Firebrand T.F. 5 strike fighter entered service with the Fleet Air Am in May 1947, when 813 Naval Air Squadron reformed at RNAS Ford and experienced greater success. It encountered several problems, limiting the squadron's ability to conduct extended operations aboard HMS Illustrious and HMS Implacable over the next 18 months. Ultimately, the aircraft were integrated into HMS Implacable in January 1949 as part of the 1st Carrier Air Group, engaging in cruises and exercises before being reassigned to HMS Indomitable two years later. From December 1951, the squadron returned to shore-based operations, focusing on training and participating in exercises. Nevertheless, due to a shortage of spare parts, the operational capability of the aircraft diminished considerably, leading to very limited flight operations.

=== Wyvern (1953–1958) ===
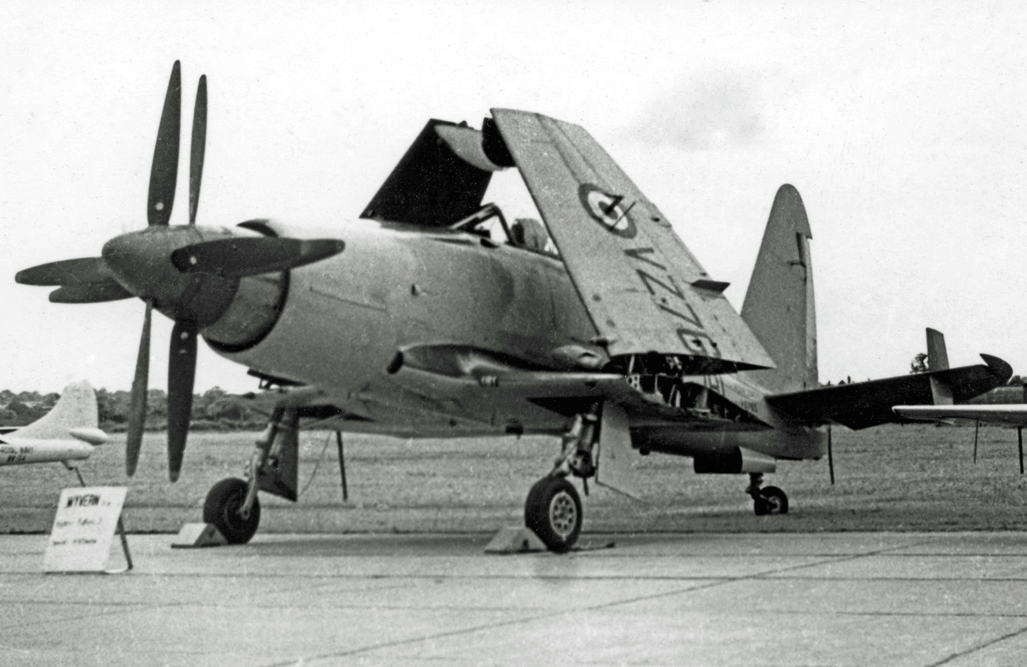
813 Squadron Westland Wyvern S.4 strike aircraft at RNAS Stretton in 1955

In May 1953, the squadron at RNAS Ford began transitioning to the Westland Wyvern S. 4 strike aircraft, which were intended to replace the Blackburn Firebrand. However, initial operational challenges delayed the integration of the new aircraft, preventing their deployment aboard the Centaur-class light fleet carrier HMS Albion until 1954. The squadron returned home in March 1955 and subsequently joined the Audacious-class aircraft carrier HMS Eagle in June for missions in the Mediterranean and Norway. Ultimately, the squadron was disbanded upon its arrival at HMNB Devonport on 21 November.

The Westland Wyvern S. 4 were once more the aircraft utilised when the squadron was reformed at RNAS Ford on 26 November 1956. In February 1957, an independent 'X' Flight was created, consisting of three aircraft, which subsequently transferred to 831 Naval Air Squadron in April. 813 Naval Air Squadron was deployed aboard HMS Eagle in August, participating in exercises in both the Atlantic and the Mediterranean during early 1958, after which the squadron was disbanded at RNAS Ford in April.

== Aircraft flown ==
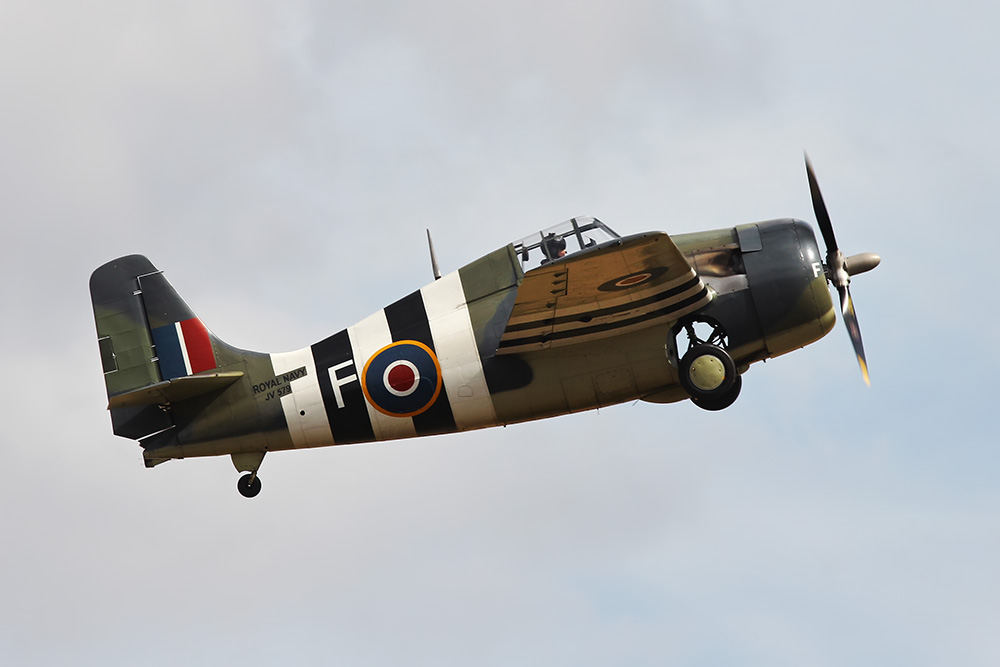
General Motors (Grumman) FM-2, Wildcat Mk VI

Types of aircraft flown by 813 Naval Air Squadron include:

- Fairey Swordfish I torpedo bomber (January 1937 – March 1943)
- Gloster Sea Gladiator fighter aircraft (June 1940 – March 1941)
- Hawker Sea Hurricane Mk IB fighter aircraft (December 1941 – August 1942)
- Fairey Swordfish II torpedo bomber (November 1942 – September 1943, November 1943 – July 1944)
- Grumman Wildcat Mk V fighter aircraft (April 1944 – February 1945)
- Fairey Swordfish III torpedo bomber (June 1944 – May 1945)
- Grumman Wildcat Mk VI fighter aircraft (September 1944 – May 1945)
- Blackburn Firebrand T.F. IV strike fighter (September 1945 – September 1946)
- Blackburn Firebrand T.F. 5 strike fighter (May 1947 – August 1953)
- Fairey Firefly FR.I fighter and reconnaissance aircraft (May 1952 – August 1953)
- Gloster Meteor T.7 jet trainer aircraft (March–December 1953)
- Westland Wyvern S.4 strike aircraft (May 1953 – November 1955, November 1956 – April 1958)

== Battle honours ==
The following Battle Honours have been awarded to 813 Naval Air Squadron.

- Calabria 1940
- Mediterranean 1940-41
- Libya 1940-41
- Taranto 1940
- East Indies 1941
- Malta Convoys 1942
- North Africa 1942-43
- Atlantic 1944
- Arctic 1944-45

== Assignments ==
813 Naval Air Squadron was assigned as needed to form part of a number of larger units:

- 1st Carrier Air Group (October 1947 - May 1951)

== Naval air stations and aircraft carriers ==
813 Naval Air Squadron was active at various naval air stations of the Royal Navy and Royal Air Force (RAF) stations, both within the United Kingdom and internationally. Additionally, it operated from several Royal Navy fleet carriers, as well as other airbases located abroad.

=== RAF Stations ===
List of Royal Air Force stations and other airbases that 813 Naval Air Squadron used while administrative management of the Fleet Air Arm was with the RAF, from formation to 24 May 1939:

- Royal Air Force Gosport, Hampshire, (18 January – 23 February 1937)
- Royal Air Force Hal Far, Malta, (6–12 March 1937)
- Royal Air Force Seletar, Singapore, (9–30 April 1937)
- Royal Air Force Kai Tak, Hong Kong, (6–28 May 1937)
  - Wei-Hai-Wei, China, (Detachment 3 June - 22 July 1937/6 September – 7 October 1937)
- Royal Air Force Kai Tak, Hong Kong, (19 October – 4 November 1937)
- Royal Air Force Kai Tak, Hong Kong, (5–30 November 1937)
- Royal Air Force Kai Tak, Hong Kong, (1 December 1937 – 8 January 1938)
- Royal Air Force Seletar, Singapore, (14–31 January 1938)
- Royal Air Force Seletar, Singapore, (5–26 February 1938)
- Bayan Lepas International Airport, Malaysia, (4–7 March 1938)
- Royal Air Force Seletar, Singapore, (9 - 16 March 1938)
- Royal Air Force Kai Tak, Hong Kong, (14 April 1938)
  - Wei-Hai-Wei, China, (Detachment 12–19 July 1938/27 July – 3 August 1938)
- Royal Air Force Seletar, Singapore, (17–27 September 1938)
  - Wei-Hai-Wei, China, (Detachment 8–10 October 1938)
- Royal Air Force Kai Tak, Hong Kong, (19 October – 1 November 1938)
- Royal Air Force Kai Tak, Hong Kong, (3–15 November 1938)
- Royal Air Force Kai Tak, Hong Kong, (17 November – 5 December 1938)
- Royal Air Force Kai Tak, Hong Kong, (7 December 1938 – 12 March 1939)
- Royal Air Force Seletar, Singapore, (17 March – 4 April 1939)
- Royal Air Force Seletar, Singapore, (24 April – 19 May 1939)

=== Aircraft carrier deployments ===
813 Naval Air Squadron was embarked in HMS Eagle on numerous occasions while administrative management of the Fleet Air Arm was with the RAF. List of dates:

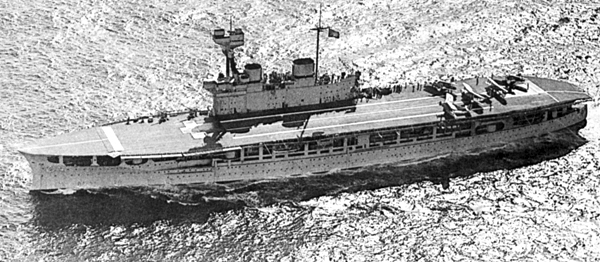
HMS Eagle

- HMS Eagle (23 February – 6 March 1937)
- HMS Eagle (12 March – 9 April 1937)
- HMS Eagle (30 April – 6 May 1937)
- HMS Eagle (28 May – 19 October 1937)
- HMS Eagle (4–5 November 1937)
- HMS Eagle (30 November – 1 December 1937)
- HMS Eagle (8 - 14 January 1938)
- HMS Eagle (31 January – 5 February 1938)
- HMS Eagle (26 February – 4 March 1938)
- HMS Eagle (7–9 March 1938)
- HMS Eagle (16 March – 14 April 1938)
- HMS Eagle (4 June – 17 September 1938)
- HMS Eagle (27 September – 19 October 1938)
- HMS Eagle (1–3 November 1938)
- HMS Eagle (15–17 November 1938)
- HMS Eagle (5–7 December 1938)
- HMS Eagle (12–17 March 1939)
- HMS Eagle (4–24 April)
- HMS Eagle (19–25 May 1939)

=== Royal Navy and World War Two ===
List of airbases and aircraft carriers that 813 Naval Air Squadron used after administrative management of the Fleet Air Arm was transferred to the Royal Navy, from 24 May 1939 and subsequently during the Second World War:

1939–1943

- Royal Air Force Kai Tak, Hong Kong, (25–29 May 1939)
- HMS Eagle (29 May – 31 July 1939)
  - Wei-Hai-Wei, China, (Detachment 3 June – 26 July 1939)
- Royal Air Force Kai Tak, Hong Kong, (31 July – 12 August 1939)
- HMS Eagle (12–18 August 1939)
- Royal Air Force Seletar, Singapore, (18–28 August 1939)
- HMS Eagle (28 August – 1 November 1939)
- Royal Air Force Seletar, Singapore, (1–8 November 1939)
- HMS Eagle (8 November 1939 – 16 March 1940)
  - Royal Air Force China Bay, Ceylon, (Detachment three aircraft 7–12 March 1940)
- Royal Air Force Kallang, Singapore, (16–17 March 1940)
- Royal Air Force Sembawang, Singapore, (17 March – 8 May 1940)
- HMS Eagle (8 May – 3 June 1940)
- Royal Naval Air Station Dekheila (HMS Grebe), Alexandria, Egypt, (3–10 June 1940)
- HMS Eagle (10–14 June 1940)
- Royal Naval Air Station Dekheila (HMS Grebe), Alexandria, Egypt, (14–22 June 1940)
- HMS Eagle (22 June – 2 July 1940)
- Royal Naval Air Station Dekheila (HMS Grebe), Alexandria, Egypt, (2 – 7 July 1940)
- HMS Eagle (7 July – 4 September 1940)
- Royal Naval Air Station Dekheila (HMS Grebe), Alexandria, Egypt, (4–23 September 1940)
  - HMS Illustrious (Detachment four aircraft 6–13 September 1940)
  - Maaten Bagush, Egypt, (Detachment three aircraft 17–29 September 1940)
- HMS Eagle (23–29 September 1940)
- Royal Naval Air Station Dekheila (HMS Grebe), Alexandria, Egypt, (29 September – 3 October 1940)
- HMS Eagle (3 October – 6 November 1940)
- Royal Naval Air Station Dekheila (HMS Grebe), Alexandria, Egypt, (6–16 November 1940)
  - HMS Illustrious (Detachment five aircraft 6–14 November 1940)
  - Royal Naval Air Station Dekheila (HMS Grebe), Alexandria, Egypt, (Detachment four aircraft 14–16 November 1940)
- HMS Eagle (16–29 November 1940)
- Royal Naval Air Station Dekheila (HMS Grebe), Alexandria, Egypt, (29 November 1940 – 11 January 1941)
  - Fuka Aerodrome, Egypt, (Detachment three/six aircraft 3–20 December 1940/5–9 January 1941)
- HMS Eagle (11–18 January 1941)
- Royal Naval Air Station Dekheila (HMS Grebe), Alexandria, Egypt, (18 January – 1 February 1941)
- HMS Eagle (1–14 February 1941)
- Royal Naval Air Station Dekheila (HMS Grebe), Alexandria, Egypt, (14 February – 25 March 1941)
  - HMS Eagle (Detachment 14–20 February 1941)
  - Ma'aten Bagush, Egypt, (Detachment three aircraft 1–24 March 1941)
- transit (25–26 March 1941)
- Port Sudan, Sudan, (26 March – 19 April 1941)
- HMS Eagle (19–26 April 1941)
- Royal Air Force Port Reitz, Kenya, (26–29 April 1941)
- HMS Eagle (29 April – 26 October 1941)
- Royal Naval Air Station Machrihanish (HMS Landrail), Argyll and Bute, (26–28 October 1941)
- Royal Naval Air Station Lee-on-Solent (HMS Daedalus), Hampshire, (28 October – 12 December 1941)
- Royal Naval Air Station Machrihanish (HMS Landrail), Argyll and Bute, (12 December 1941 – 20 January 1942)
- HMS Eagle (20 January – February 1942)
- RN Air Section Gibraltar, Gibraltar, (24 February – 17 May 1942)
- HMS Eagle (Fighter Flight) (8 March – 11 August 1942)
- HMS Eagle (17 May – 16 June 1942)
  - HMS Argus (Detachment four aircraft 17–19 May 1942/24 May – 16 June 1942)
- RN Air Section Gibraltar, Gibraltar, (16 June – 12 December 1942)
  - Blida Airport, Algeria, (Detachment six aircraft 10 November – 12 December 1942)
- Royal Air Force Tafaraoui, Algeria, (12 December 1942 – 20 March 1943)
  - Bone Airfield, Algeria, (Detachment six aircraft 12 December 1942 – 5 March 1943)
  - RN Air Section Gibraltar, Gibraltar, (Detachment six aircraft 5–20 March 1943)
- RN Air Section Gibraltar, Gibraltar, (20 March – 4 October 1943)
  - HMS Hunter (Detachment 28 March – 11 April 1943)
  - Royal Air Force Tafaraoui, Algeria, (Detachment six aircraft 8 May – 10 July 1943)
- HMS Illustrious/SS Lancashire (crews) (4–18 October 1943)
- disbanded UK - (18 October 1943)

1943–1945

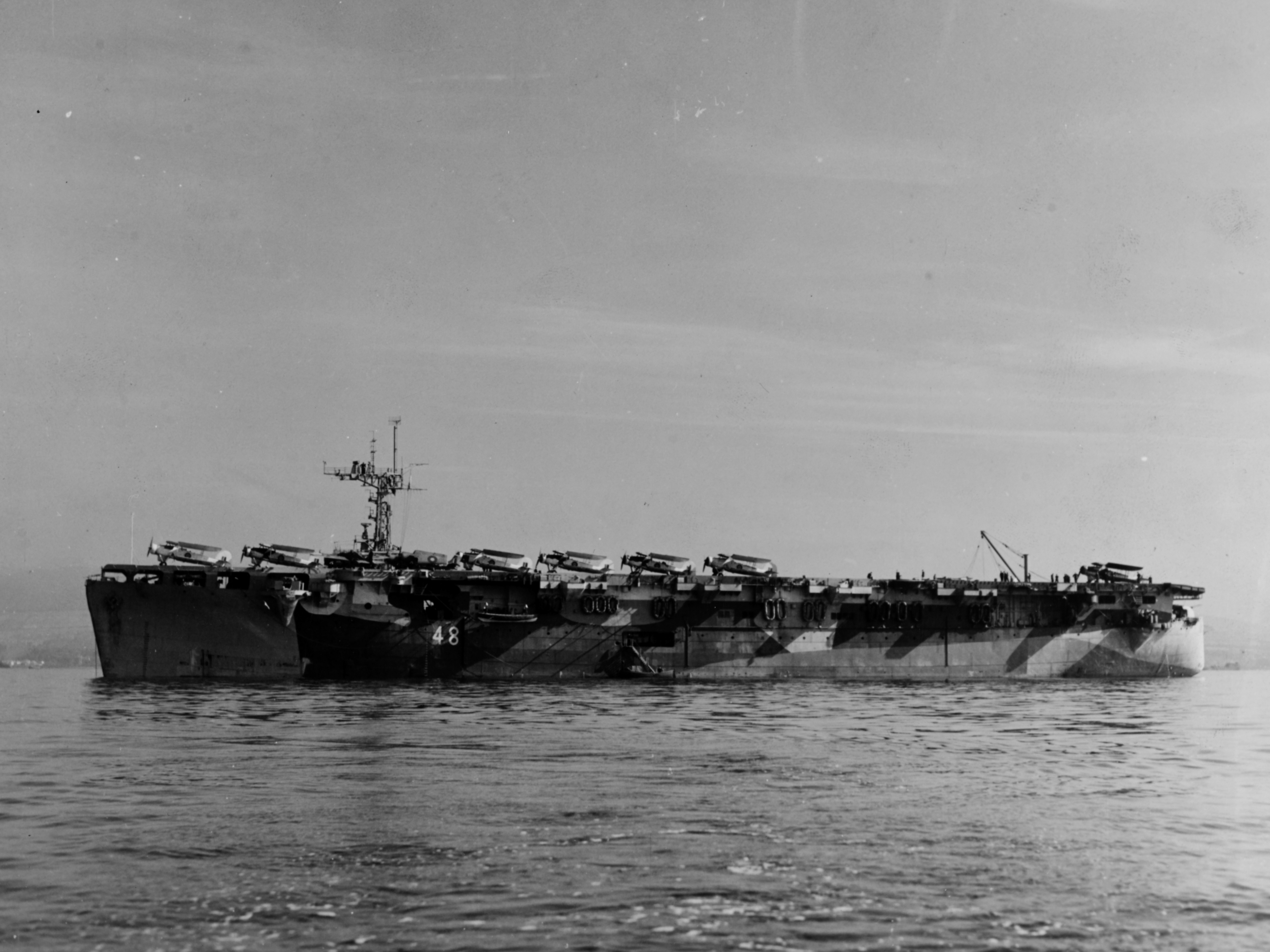
The Royal Navy escort carrier HMS Campania at anchor. Seven Fairey Swordfish and three Grumman Wildcat aircraft are visible on deck

- Royal Naval Air Station Donibristle (HMS Merlin), Fife, (1 November – 13 December 1943)
- Royal Naval Air Station Dunino (HMS Jackdaw II), Fife, (13 December 1943 – 20 January 1944)
- Royal Naval Air Station Inskip (HMS Nightjar), Lancashire, (20 January – 15 February 1944)
- Royal Naval Air Station Burscough (HMS Ringtail), Lancashire, (15–26 February 1944)
- Royal Naval Air Station Machrihanish (HMS Landrail), Argyll and Bute, (26 February – 26 March 1944)
- Royal Naval Air Station Maydown (HMS Shrike), County Londonderry, (26 March – 26 April 1944)
- HMS Campania (26 April – 18 August 1944)
  - Royal Naval Air Station Abbotsinch (HMS Sanderling), Renfrewshire, (Detachment three aircraft 21 July – 3 August 1944)
- Royal Naval Air Station Belfast (HMS Gadwall), County Antrim, (18 August – 16 September 1944)
- HMS Campania (16 September – 11 November 1944)
  - Royal Naval Air Station Machrihanish (HMS Landrail), Argyll and Bute, (Detachment 5–11 November 1944)
- Royal Naval Air Station Machrihanish (HMS Landrial), Argyll and Bute, (11–20 November 1944)
- Royal Naval Air Station Burscough (HMS Ringtail), Lancashire, (20–30 November 1944)
- HMS Campania (30 November 1944 – 1 March 1945)
  - Royal Naval Air Station Hatston (HMS Sparowhawk), Mainland, Orkney, (Detachment six aircraft 19–24 January 1945)
- Royal Naval Air Station Machrihanish (HMS Landrail), Argyll and Bute, (1 March – 8 April 1945)
- HMS Vindex (8 April – 15 May 1945)
  - Wildcat Flight:
    - Royal Naval Air Station Eglinton (HMS Gannet), County Londonderry, (22–26 April 1944)
    - HMS Campania (26 April – 6 September 1944)
    - Royal Naval Air Station Eglinton (HMS Gannet), County Londonderry, (6–12 September 1944)
    - HMS Campania (12–20 December 1944)
    - Royal Naval Air Station Hatston (HMS Sparrowhawk), Mainland, Orkney, (2 December 1944 – 21 February 1945)
    - HMS Campania (21–24 February 1945)
    - Royal Naval Air Station Hatston (HMS Sparrowhawk), Mainland, Orkney, (24 February – 20 March 1945)
    - Royal Naval Air Station Machrihanish (HMS Landrail), Argyll and Bute, (20 March – 8 April 1945)
    - HMS Vindex (8 April – 15 May 1945)
  - Royal Naval Air Station Hatston (HMS Sparrowhawk), Mainland Orkney, (Detachment four aircraft 8 April 1945)
  - Royal Naval Air Station Grimsetter (HMS Robin), Mainland, Orkney, (Detachment four aircraft 18 April 1945)
- disbanded - (15 May 1945)

== Commanding officers ==
List of commanding officers of 813 Naval Air Squadron with date of appointment:

1937–1943

- Lieutenant Commander C.R.V. Pugh, RN, (Squadron Leader, RAF), from 18 January 1937
- Squadron Leader E.G. Forbes, RAF, from 10 March 1938
- Lieutenant Commander N. Kennedy, DSC, RN, (Squadron Leader, RAF), from 1 September 1938
- Lieutenant Commander D.H. Elles, RN, from 9 January 1941
- Lieutenant Commander A.V. Lyle, RN, from 5 March 1941
- Lieutenant Commander D.H. Elles, RN, from 28 August 1941
- Lieutenant Commander A.V. Lyle, RN, from 25 November 1941
- Lieutenant Commander C.L. Hutchinson, RN, from 25 March 1942; (KiFA 7 February 1943)
- Lieutenant Commander D.A.P. Weatherall, RN, from 8 February 1943
- Lieutenant J.H. Ree, RN, from 27 June 1943
- Lieutenant Commander D.A.P. Weatherall, RN, from 1 August 1943
- disbanded - 18 October 1943

1943–1945

- Lieutenant Commander(A) J.R. Parrish, DSC, RNVR, from 1 November 1943
- Lieutenant Commander(A) C.A. Allen, RNVR, 2 September 1944; (KiA 30 September 1944)
- Lieutenant Commander(A) S.G. Cooke, RNVR, 12 October 1944
- disbanded - 15 May 1945

1945–1946

- Lieutenant Commander K. Lee-White, MBE, RN, from 1 September 1945
- Lieutenant(A) W. Orr, RN, from 27 August 1946
- disbanded - 30 September 1946

1947–1955

- Lieutenant Commander(A) A.W.R. Turney, RN, from 1 May 1947
- Lieutenant Commander(A) C.R.J. Coxon, RN, from 22 October 1947
- Lieutenant Commander C.K. Roberts, RN, from 1 September 1948
- Lieutenant Commander J.M. Henry, RN, from 5 April 1949
- Lieutenant Commander D.R.S. Abbott, RN, from 21 August 1950 (KiFA 1 October 1950)
- Lieutenant Commander J.S. Barnes, RN, from 2 October 1950
- Lieutenant Commander L.W.A. Barrington, RN, from 15 March 1951
- Lieutenant Commander A.D. Corkhill, DSC, RN, from 12 February 1952
- Lieutenant Commander S.S. Laurie, RN, from 3 March 1953
- Lieutenant Commander C.E. Price, AFC, RN, 4 July 1953
- Lieutenant Commander R.M. Crosley, DFC & Bar, RN, 20 December 1954
- disbanded - 21 November 1955

1956–1958

- Lieutenant Commander R.W. Halliday, AFC, RN, from 26 November 1956
- Lieutenant Commander R.W.T. Abraham, RN, from 2 December 1957
- disbanded – 22 April 1958

Note: Abbreviation (A) signifies Air Branch of the RN or RNVR.

== See also ==
- Arctic naval operations of World War II
- Operation Husky order of battle
- Exercise Strikeback
