= Soviet minesweeper T-114 =

Minesweeper of the Soviet Navy

History

United States
- Name: USS Alchemy (AMc-118)
- Builder: Tampa Shipbuilding Company
- Reclassified: AM-141, 21 February 1942
- Laid down: 8 April 1942
- Launched: 7 December 1942
- Completed: 11 August 1943
- Fate: Transferred to the USSR, 11 August 1943
- Reclassified: MSF-141, 7 February 1955
- Stricken: 1 January 1983

Soviet Union
- Name: T-114
- Acquired: 11 August 1943
- Fate: Torpedoed and sunk, 13 August 1944

General characteristics
- Class & type: Admirable-class minesweeper
- Displacement: 650 tons
- Length: 184 ft 6 in (56.24 m)
- Beam: 33 ft (10 m)
- Draft: 9 ft 9 in (2.97 m)
- Propulsion: 2 × ALCO 539 diesel engines, 1,710 shp (1,280 kW); Farrel-Birmingham single reduction gear; 2 shafts
- Speed: 14.8 knots (27.4 km/h)
- Complement: 104
- Armament: 1 × 3-inch/50-caliber gun DP; 2 × twin Bofors 40 mm L/60 guns; 1 × Hedgehog anti-submarine mortar; 2 × Depth charge tracks

T-114 was a minesweeper of the Soviet Navy during World War II. She had originally been built as USS Alchemy (AM-141), an Admirable-class minesweeper, for the United States Navy during World War II, but never saw active service in the U.S. Navy. Upon completion she was transferred to the Soviet Union under Lend-Lease as T-114; she was never returned to the United States. T-114 was sunk by U-365 in the Kara Sea in August 1944. Because of the Cold War, the U.S. Navy was unaware of this fate and the vessel remained on the American Naval Vessel Register until she was struck on 1 January 1983.

== Career ==
Alchemy was laid down on 8 June 1942 at Tampa, Florida, by the Tampa Shipbuilding Co.; sponsored by Mrs. W. E. Edgarton; and completed on 11 August 1943. On the same day that she was completed, Alchemy was turned over to the Soviet Navy under the terms of the lend-lease program. She served the Soviets as T-114, until she was torpedoed and sunk 13 August 1944 in the Kara Sea by the German submarine U-365.

Alchemy was carried on the American Navy List as MSF-141 after 7 February 1955, until struck on 1 January 1983.
