= German submarine U-451 =

German World War II submarine

- U-995, a Type VIIC U-boat at the German navy memorial at Laboe. U-451 was almost identical

History

Nazi Germany
- Name: U-451
- Ordered: 30 October 1939
- Builder: Deutsche Werke AG, Kiel
- Yard number: 282
- Laid down: 18 May 1940
- Launched: 5 March 1941
- Commissioned: 3 May 1941
- Fate: Sunk on 21 December 1941

General characteristics
- Class & type: Type VIIC submarine
- Displacement: 769 tonnes (757 long tons) surfaced; 871 t (857 long tons) submerged
- Length: 67.10 m (220 ft 2 in) o/a; 50.50 m (165 ft 8 in) pressure hull
- Beam: 6.20 m (20 ft 4 in) o/a; 4.70 m (15 ft 5 in) pressure hull
- Height: 9.60 m (31 ft 6 in)
- Draught: 4.74 m (15 ft 7 in)
- Installed power: 2,800–3,200 PS (2,100–2,400 kW; 2,800–3,200 bhp) (diesels); 750 PS (550 kW; 740 shp) (electric)
- Propulsion: 2 shafts; 2 × diesel engines; 2 × electric motors
- Speed: 17.7 knots (32.8 km/h; 20.4 mph) surfaced; 7.6 knots (14.1 km/h; 8.7 mph) submerged
- Range: 8,500 nautical miles (15,700 km; 9,800 mi) at 10 knots (19 km/h; 12 mph) surfaced; 80 nmi (150 km; 92 mi) at 4 knots (7.4 km/h; 4.6 mph) submerged
- Test depth: 230 m (750 ft); Crush depth: 250–295 m (820–968 ft)
- Complement: 4 officers, 40–56 enlisted
- Armament: 5 × 53.3 cm (21 in) torpedo tubes (four bow, one stern); 14 × torpedoes or 26 TMA mines; 1 × 8.8 cm (3.46 in) deck gun (220 rounds); 1 x 2 cm (0.79 in) C/30 AA gun

Service record
- Part of: 3rd U-boat Flotilla; 3 May – 21 December 1941
- Identification codes: M 41 858
- Commanders: K.Kapt. Eberhard Hoffmann; 3 May – 21 December 1941
- Operations: 4 patrols: 1st patrol: 30 July – 12 August 1941; 2nd patrol: a. 19 August – 12 September 1941; b. 16 – 26 September 1941; 3rd patrol: 25 November – 12 December 1941; 4th patrol: 15 – 21 December 1941
- Victories: 1 warship sunk (550 tons)

German submarine U-451 was a Type VIIC U-boat in the service of Nazi Germany's Kriegsmarine during World War II.

Commissioned on 3 May 1941, with Korvettenkapitän Eberhard Hoffmann in command, she was assigned from then until 1 July to the 3rd U-boat Flotilla for training, and from 1 July 1941 until 21 December, she remained with the 3rd flotilla for operations.

She carried out four patrols before being lost in action.

== Design ==
German Type VIIC submarines were preceded by the shorter Type VIIB submarines. U-451 had a displacement of 769 tonnes (757 long tons) when at the surface and 871 tonnes (857 long tons) while submerged. She had a total length of 67.10 m (220 ft 2 in), a pressure hull length of 50.50 m (165 ft 8 in), a beam of 6.20 m (20 ft 4 in), a height of 9.60 m (31 ft 6 in), and a draught of 4.74 m (15 ft 7 in). The submarine was powered by two Germaniawerft F46 four-stroke, six-cylinder supercharged diesel engines producing a total of 2,800 to 3,200 metric horsepower (2,060 to 2,350 kW; 2,760 to 3,160 shp) for use while surfaced, two Brown, Boveri & Cie GG UB 720/8 double-acting electric motors producing a total of 750 metric horsepower (550 kW; 740 shp) for use while submerged. She had two shafts and two 1.23 m (4 ft) propellers. The boat was capable of operating at depths of up to 230 metres (750 ft).

The submarine had a maximum surface speed of 17.7 knots (32.8 km/h; 20.4 mph) and a maximum submerged speed of 7.6 knots (14.1 km/h; 8.7 mph). When submerged, the boat could operate for 80 nautical miles (150 km; 92 mi) at 4 knots (7.4 km/h; 4.6 mph); when surfaced, she could travel 8,500 nautical miles (15,700 km; 9,800 mi) at 10 knots (19 km/h; 12 mph). U-451 was fitted with five 53.3 cm (21 in) torpedo tubes (four fitted at the bow and one at the stern), fourteen torpedoes, one 8.8 cm (3.46 in) SK C/35 naval gun, 220 rounds, and a 2 cm (0.79 in) C/30 anti-aircraft gun. The boat had a complement of between forty-four and sixty.

== Service history ==
The boat set-off from Kiel and moved into Norwegian waters between 23 June and 24 July 1941.

=== First and second patrols ===
She departed Kirkenes in the far north on 30 July 1941, patrolled the Barents Sea and sank one warship of 550 tons, the Soviet corvette Zhemchug (No 27), on 10 August. She returned to Kirkenes on 12 August.

Her second patrol, between 19 August and 12 September 1941, lasted 25 days. She then returned to Kiel.

=== Third and fourth patrols ===
Starting from Kiel on 25 November 1941, she sailed to Lorient in occupied France, arriving on 12 December.

Her fourth and final sortie began on 15 December 1941, taking her from Lorient, through the Bay of Biscay to a point in mid-Atlantic north of the Azores. She then turned toward the Mediterranean.

=== Loss ===
She was sunk off Tangier, Morocco at 35°55′N 6°8′W, on the night of 21 December 1941 by a Fairey Swordfish Mk. I, V4431, flying with 812 Naval Air Squadron from RNAS North Front, Gibraltar. U-451 was first detected by Air-to-Surface Vessel radar (ASV) at a range of 3 1/2 miles and about 18 miles northwest of Cape Spartel. "The Swordfish closed the contact and sighted the U-Boat on the surface steering to the eastward. Three depth charges were dropped ahead of the U-Boat and across her bows. The centre depth charge of the stick, set at 25 feet, exploded immediately under the U-Boat, which was not seen again. The details of the U-Boat's disappearance could not be observed as U 451 was enveloped in the spray of the depth-charge explosions. Two large oil patches were seen, each 300 yards in diameter." The sole surviving crew member, stated that he was on the bridge with three ratings at the time of the attack, and that the noise of the diesel engines obscured the sound of the attacking aircraft until the moment of weapons release. He was unable to get inside the vessel before the hatch was closed. "He stated that the U-boat then sank bows down. The prisoner flung himself into the water and swam for an hour and a half before he was picked up by Myosotis."

== Summary of raiding history ==
Date	Ship Name	Nationality	Tonnage (Note: Merchant ship tonnages are in gross register tons. Military vessels are listed by tons displacement.)	Fate
10 August 1941	Zhemchug (No 27)	Soviet Navy	550	Sunk

== Bibliography ==
- Busch, Rainer; Röll, Hans-Joachim (1999). German U-boat commanders of World War II : a biographical dictionary. Translated by Brooks, Geoffrey. London, Annapolis, Md: Greenhill Books, Naval Institute Press. ISBN 1-55750-186-6.
- Busch, Rainer; Röll, Hans-Joachim (1999). Deutsche U-Boot-Verluste von September 1939 bis Mai 1945 [German U-boat losses from September 1939 to May 1945]. Der U-Boot-Krieg (in German). Vol. IV. Hamburg, Berlin, Bonn: Mittler. ISBN 3-8132-0514-2.
- Gröner, Erich (1985). Die deutschen Kriegsschiffe 1815–1945 / 3, U-Boote, Hilfskreuzer, Minenschiffe, Netzleger, Sperrbrecher (in German). Koblenz: Bernard & Graefe. ISBN 3-7637-4802-4. OCLC 310610321.
- Gröner, Erich; Jung, Dieter; Maass, Martin (1991). U-boats and Mine Warfare Vessels. German Warships 1815–1945. Vol. 2. Translated by Thomas, Keith; Magowan, Rachel. London: Conway Maritime Press. ISBN 0-85177-593-4.
- Kemp, Paul (1999). U-Boats Destroyed - German Submarine Losses in the World Wars. London: Arms & Armour. ISBN 1-85409-515-3.
