= HMS Cassandra (R62) =

C-class destroyer

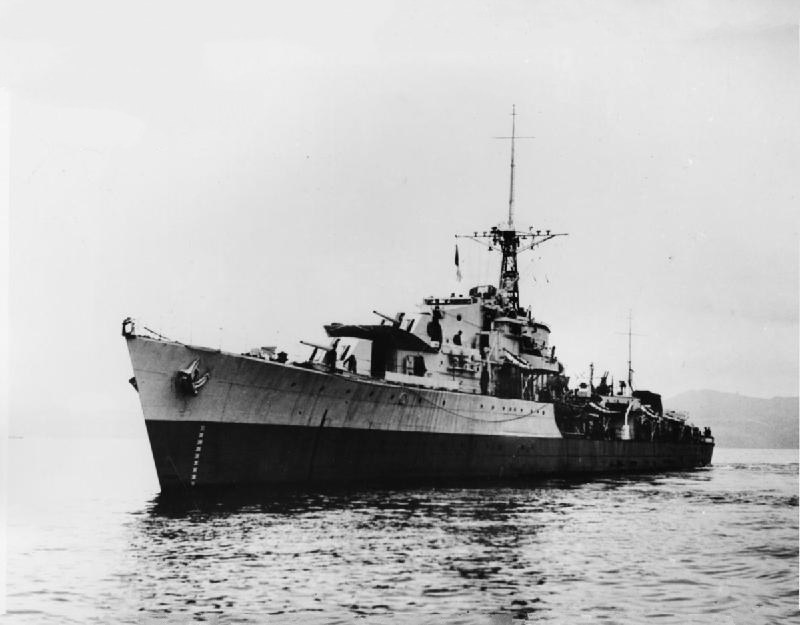

History

United Kingdom
- Name: HMS Cassandra
- Ordered: February 1942
- Builder: Yarrow Shipbuilders, Scotstoun
- Laid down: 30 January 1943
- Launched: 29 November 1943
- Completed: 28 July 1944
- Commissioned: 28 July 1944
- Renamed: Ordered as HMS Tourmaline; Renamed HMS Cassandra in November 1942
- Identification: Pennant number: R62 initially, but changed to D10 in 1945
- Motto: Furiosior undis: 'More mad than the waves'
- Honours and awards: Arctic 1944
- Fate: Arrived at breaker's yard for scrapping on 28 April 1967
- Badge: On a Field Blue, a woman's head affronte with two snakes wreathed round her neck and poised about her ears all Proper.

General characteristics
- Class & type: C-class destroyer
- Displacement: 1,710 tons (standard) 2,520 tons (full)
- Length: 363 ft (111 m) o/a
- Beam: 35.75 ft (10.90 m)
- Draught: 10 ft (3.0 m) light, 14.5 ft (4.4 m) full
- Propulsion: 2 Admiralty 3-drum boilers, Parsons geared steam turbines, 40,000 shp (30,000 kW), 2 shafts
- Speed: 37 knots (69 km/h)
- Range: 615 tons oil, 1,400 nautical miles (2,600 km) at 32 knots (59 km/h)
- Complement: 186
- Armament: 3 × QF 4.5 in (114 mm) L/45 guns Mark IV on mounts CP Mk.V; 2 × Bofors 40 mm L/60 guns on twin mount "Hazemeyer" Mk.IV, or; 4 × anti-aircraft mountings; Bofors 40 mm, single mount Mk.III; QF 2-pdr Mk VIII, single mount Mk.XVI; Oerlikon 20 mm, single mount P Mk.III; Oerlikon 20 mm, twin mount Mk.V; 2 × pentuple tubes for 21 inch (533 mm) torpedoes Mk.IX; 4 throwers and 2 racks for 96 depth charges; 6 × Squid anti-submarine launchers

HMS Cassandra was a C-class destroyer of the Royal Navy, ordered in February 1942 from Yarrow Shipbuilders. She was originally to be named HMS Tourmaline but this was changed to Cassandra in November 1942 to fit her revised class name. She was laid down on 30 January 1943 and launched on 29 November 1943.

== Wartime service ==
After her commissioning, she served primarily in Northern waters, escorting Russian convoys and was engaged in the search for the Tirpitz. On 11 December 1944, she was hit by a torpedo from the U-boat U-365 under the command of Oberleutnant zur See Diether Todenhagen. 62 men died in the attack and she was towed, first by the frigate Bahamas and then by a Soviet Navy tugboat to Kola Inlet. U-365 was sunk with all hands two days later by a Fairey Swordfish launched from the aircraft carrier Campania.

== Post war service ==
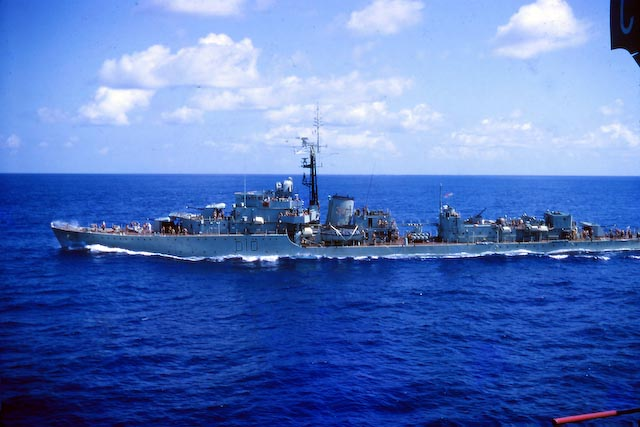
HMS Cassandra, taken from HMS Centaur, c1964

After the war, Cassandra's repairs were completed and she was placed in reserve in 1946. She then served in the Mediterranean Sea and Indian Ocean. Cassandra was modernised by Yarrow and Company. This involved her being fitted with an enclosed bridge and Squid anti-submarine mortars. One set of torpedo tubes and 'X' gun turret were removed at this time.

She re-entered service in April 1960 and was allocated for service in the Far East as part of the 8th Destroyer Squadron. In late June 1961, in response to Iraqi threats to annex Kuwait, Cassandra was ordered to reinforce British naval forces in the Persian Gulf as part of Operation Vantage, arriving on 7 July. The British response successfully deterred Iraq from invading Kuwait, and Cassandra was relieved by the frigate Blackpool on 29 July, allowing the destroyer to return to the Far East station. Cassandra covered 50,000 miles during a commission in 1962-3 which took her from the Far East and returning to Portsmouth. In February 1963 the ship became part of the 21st Destroyer Squadron in the Mediterranean. In 1964 and 1965 she served in the Mediterranean and the Far East, including service in the Indonesian Confrontation.

The destroyer was placed in reserve until paying off in January 1966. Cassandra arrived at the breaker's yard of Thos. W. Ward at Inverkeithing for scrapping on 28 April 1967.

== Publications ==
- Colledge, J. J.; Warlow, Ben (2006) [1969]. Ships of the Royal Navy: The Complete Record of All Fighting Ships of the Royal Navy from the 15th Century to the Present (3rd Rev ed.). London: Chatham Publishing. ISBN 978-1-86176-281-8. OCLC 67375475.
- Critchley, Mike (1982). British Warships Since 1945: Part 3: Destroyers. Liskeard, UK: Maritime Books. ISBN 0-9506323-9-2.
- Marriott, Leo (1989). Royal Navy Destroyers Since 1945. Ian Allan Ltd. ISBN 0-7110-1817-0.
