= Soviet minesweeper T-118 =

Minesweeper of the Soviet Navy

History

United States
- Name: USS Armada (AMc-122)
- Builder: Tampa Shipbuilding Company
- Reclassified: AM-145, 21 February 1942
- Laid down: 18 October 1942
- Launched: 7 December 1942
- Completed: 16 September 1943
- Fate: Transferred to the USSR, 16 September 1943
- Reclassified: MSF-145, 7 February 1955
- Stricken: 1 January 1983

Soviet Union
- Name: T-118
- Acquired: 16 September 1943
- Fate: Torpedoed and sunk, 12 August 1944

General characteristics
- Class & type: Admirable-class minesweeper
- Displacement: 650 tons
- Length: 184 ft 6 in (56.24 m)
- Beam: 33 ft (10 m)
- Draft: 9 ft 9 in (2.97 m)
- Propulsion: 2 × ALCO 539 diesel engines, 1,710 shp (1,280 kW); Farrel-Birmingham single reduction gear; 2 shafts
- Speed: 14.8 knots (27.4 km/h)
- Complement: 104
- Armament: 1 × 3-inch/50-caliber gun DP; 2 × twin Bofors 40 mm guns; 1 × Hedgehog anti-submarine mortar; 2 × Depth charge tracks

T-118 was a minesweeper of the Soviet Navy during World War II and the Cold War. She had originally been built as USS Armada (AM-145), an Admirable-class minesweeper, for the United States Navy during World War II, but never saw active service in the U.S. Navy. Upon completion she was transferred to the Soviet Union under Lend-Lease as T-118; she was never returned to the United States. T-118 was sunk by U-365 in the Kara Sea in August 1944. Because of the Cold War, the U.S. Navy was unaware of this fate and the vessel remained on the American Naval Vessel Register until she was struck on 1 January 1983.

== Career ==
Armada was laid down on 18 October 1942 at Tampa, Florida, by the Tampa Shipbuilding Co.; launched on 7 December 1942; sponsored by Mrs. B. C. Crawford; and completed on 16 September 1943. She was turned over to the USSR on the day of her completion and was commissioned in the Soviet Navy as T-118. She was torpedoed and sunk in the Kara Sea on 12 August 1944 by German submarine U-365.

Armada was carried on the American Navy List as MSF-145 after 7 February 1955 until 1 January 1983 when her name was struck.
