= German submarine U-362 =

German World War II submarine

History

Nazi Germany
- Name: U-362
- Ordered: 7 December 1940
- Builder: Flensburger Schiffbau-Gesellschaft, Flensburg
- Yard number: 481
- Laid down: 9 November 1941
- Launched: 21 October 1942
- Commissioned: 4 February 1943
- Fate: Sunk on 5 September 1944

General characteristics
- Class & type: Type VIIC submarine
- Displacement: 769 tonnes (757 long tons) surfaced; 871 t (857 long tons) submerged
- Length: 67.10 m (220 ft 2 in) o/a; 50.50 m (165 ft 8 in) pressure hull
- Beam: 6.20 m (20 ft 4 in) o/a; 4.70 m (15 ft 5 in) pressure hull
- Height: 9.60 m (31 ft 6 in)
- Draught: 4.72 m (15 ft 6 in)
- Installed power: 2,800–3,200 PS (2,100–2,400 kW; 2,800–3,200 bhp) (diesels); 750 PS (550 kW; 740 shp) (electric)
- Propulsion: 2 shafts; 2 × diesel engines; 2 × electric motors
- Speed: 17.7 knots (32.8 km/h; 20.4 mph) surfaced; 7.6 knots (14.1 km/h; 8.7 mph) submerged
- Range: 8,500 nmi (15,700 km; 9,800 mi) at 10 knots (19 km/h; 12 mph) surfaced; 80 nmi (150 km; 92 mi) at 4 knots (7.4 km/h; 4.6 mph) submerged
- Test depth: 230 m (750 ft); Calculated crush depth: 250–295 m (820–968 ft)
- Complement: 44-52 officers and ratings
- Armament: 5 × 53.3 cm (21 in) torpedo tubes (four bow, one stern); 14 × torpedoes or 26 TMA mines; 1 × 8.8 cm (3.46 in) deck gun (220 rounds); 4 × twin 2 cm (0.79 in) C/30 anti-aircraft guns

Service record
- Part of: 8th U-boat Flotilla; 4 February 1943 – 29 February 1944; 13th U-boat Flotilla; 1 March – 5 September 1944
- Identification codes: M 50 254
- Commanders: Oblt.z.S. Ludwig Franz; 4 February 1943 – 5 September 1944
- Operations: 5 patrols: 1st patrol: a. 6 – 10 February 1944; b. 14 – 28 February 1944; c. 29 February – 1 March 1944; d. 9 – 12 March 1944; e. 5 – 7 April 1944; 2nd patrol: 8 – 13 April 1944; 3rd patrol: 14 May – 7 June 1944; 4th patrol: 14 – 20 July 1944; 5th patrol: 2 August – 5 September 1944
- Victories: None

German submarine U-362 was a Type VIIC U-boat built for Nazi Germany's Kriegsmarine for service during World War II.

Built by Flensburger Schiffbau-Gesellschaft at Flensburg, the U-boat was laid down 9 November 1941, launched on 21 October 1942, and commissioned on 4 February 1943 with Oberleutnant zur See Ludwig Franz in command.

== Design ==
German Type VIIC submarines were preceded by the shorter Type VIIB submarines. U-362 had a displacement of 769 tonnes (757 long tons) when at the surface and 871 tonnes (857 long tons) while submerged. She had a total length of 67.10 m (220 ft 2 in), a pressure hull length of 50.50 m (165 ft 8 in), a beam of 6.20 m (20 ft 4 in), a height of 9.60 m (31 ft 6 in), and a draught of 4.74 m (15 ft 7 in). The submarine was powered by two Germaniawerft F46 four-stroke, six-cylinder supercharged diesel engines producing a total of 2,800 to 3,200 metric horsepower (2,060 to 2,350 kW; 2,760 to 3,160 shp) for use while surfaced, two AEG GU 460/8–27 double-acting electric motors producing a total of 750 metric horsepower (550 kW; 740 shp) for use while submerged. She had two shafts and two 1.23 m (4 ft) propellers. The boat was capable of operating at depths of up to 230 metres (750 ft).

The submarine had a maximum surface speed of 17.7 knots (32.8 km/h; 20.4 mph) and a maximum submerged speed of 7.6 knots (14.1 km/h; 8.7 mph). When submerged, the boat could operate for 80 nautical miles (150 km; 92 mi) at 4 knots (7.4 km/h; 4.6 mph); when surfaced, she could travel 8,500 nautical miles (15,700 km; 9,800 mi) at 10 knots (19 km/h; 12 mph). U-362 was fitted with five 53.3 cm (21 in) torpedo tubes (four fitted at the bow and one at the stern), fourteen torpedoes, one 8.8 cm (3.46 in) SK C/35 naval gun, 220 rounds, and four twin 2 cm (0.79 in) C/30 anti-aircraft guns. The boat had a complement of between forty-four and sixty.

== Service history ==
Sailing from Kiel on 6 February 1944, U-362 first sailed for northern Norway from where she sortied out into the Norwegian Sea on several patrols, without sinking any ships.

The U-boat sailed from Hammerfest on 2 August 1944, on her fifth and final patrol and headed east across the Barents Sea, north of Russia. On 5 September 1944 in the Kara Sea, she was sunk by depth charges from the T-116 at 75°51′N 89°27′E. All 51 of the crew were lost.

=== Wolfpacks ===
U-362 took part in five wolfpacks, namely:

- Werwolf (23 – 27 February 1944)
- Donner (11 – 12 April 1944)
- Trutz (16 – 31 May 1944)
- Grimm (31 May – 6 June 1944)
- Greif (3 August – 5 September 1944)

== Bibliography ==
- Busch, Rainer; Röll, Hans-Joachim (1999). German U-boat commanders of World War II : a biographical dictionary. Translated by Brooks, Geoffrey. London, Annapolis, Md: Greenhill Books, Naval Institute Press. ISBN 1-55750-186-6.
- Busch, Rainer; Röll, Hans-Joachim (1999). Deutsche U-Boot-Verluste von September 1939 bis Mai 1945 [German U-boat losses from September 1939 to May 1945]. Der U-Boot-Krieg (in German). Vol. IV. Hamburg, Berlin, Bonn: Mittler. ISBN 3-8132-0514-2.
- Gröner, Erich; Jung, Dieter; Maass, Martin (1991). U-boats and Mine Warfare Vessels. German Warships 1815–1945. Vol. 2. Translated by Thomas, Keith; Magowan, Rachel. London: Conway Maritime Press. ISBN 0-85177-593-4.
- Kemp, Paul (1999). U-Boats Destroyed - German Submarine Losses in the World Wars. London: Arms & Armour. ISBN 1-85409-515-3.
