= German submarine U-365 =

German World War II submarine

History

Nazi Germany
- Name: U-365
- Ordered: 20 January 1941
- Builder: Flensburger Schiffbau-Gesellschaft, Flensburg
- Yard number: 484
- Laid down: 21 April 1942
- Launched: 9 March 1943
- Commissioned: 8 June 1943
- Fate: Sunk on 13 December 1944

General characteristics
- Class & type: Type VIIC submarine
- Displacement: 769 tonnes (757 long tons) surfaced; 871 t (857 long tons) submerged
- Length: 67.10 m (220 ft 2 in) o/a; 50.50 m (165 ft 8 in) pressure hull
- Beam: 6.20 m (20 ft 4 in) o/a; 4.70 m (15 ft 5 in) pressure hull
- Height: 9.60 m (31 ft 6 in)
- Draught: 4.74 m (15 ft 7 in)
- Installed power: 2,800–3,200 PS (2,100–2,400 kW; 2,800–3,200 bhp) (diesels); 750 PS (550 kW; 740 shp) (electric)
- Propulsion: 2 shafts; 2 × diesel engines; 2 × electric motors
- Speed: 17.7 knots (32.8 km/h; 20.4 mph) surfaced; 7.6 knots (14.1 km/h; 8.7 mph) submerged
- Range: 8,500 nmi (15,700 km; 9,800 mi) at 10 knots (19 km/h; 12 mph) surfaced; 80 nmi (150 km; 92 mi) at 4 knots (7.4 km/h; 4.6 mph) submerged
- Test depth: 230 m (750 ft); Crush depth: 250–295 m (820–968 ft)
- Complement: 4 officers, 40–56 enlisted
- Armament: 5 × 53.3 cm (21 in) torpedo tubes (4 bow, 1 stern); 14 × torpedoes; 1 × 8.8 cm (3.46 in) deck gun (220 rounds); 2 × twin 2 cm (0.79 in) C/30 anti-aircraft guns

Service record
- Part of: 5th U-boat Flotilla; 8 June 1943 – 29 February 1944; 9th U-boat Flotilla; 1 March – 8 June 1944; 13th U-boat Flotilla; 9 June – 13 December 1944
- Identification codes: M 52 253
- Commanders: Kptlt. Heimar Wedemeyer; 8 June 1943 – 17 November 1944; Oblt.z.S. Diether Todenhagen; 18 November – 13 December 1944
- Operations: 8 patrols: 1st patrol: 26 March – 5 April 1944; 2nd patrol: 8 – 24 April 1944; 3rd patrol: a. 1 – 21 May 1944; b. 3 – 7 June 1944; 4th patrol: 23 June – 22 July 1944; 5th patrol: a. 5 – 25 August 1944; b. 27 – 28 August 1944; 6th patrol: a. 6 – 8 September 1944; b. 28 Sep – 3 October 1944; 7th patrol: a. 7 – 8 October 1944; b. 12 October – 11 November 1944; 8th patrol: 22 November – 13 December 1944
- Victories: 1 merchant ship sunk (7,540 GRT); 3 warships sunk (1,355 tons); 1 warship damaged (1,710 tons)

German submarine U-365 was a Type VIIC U-boat built for Nazi Germany's Kriegsmarine for service during World War II. She served exclusively against the Arctic Convoys from Britain to Murmansk and Arkhangelsk, principally targeting the Soviet forces which greeted the convoys in the Barents Sea.

== Design ==
German Type VIIC submarines were preceded by the shorter Type VIIB submarines. U-364 had a displacement of 769 tonnes (757 long tons) when at the surface and 871 tonnes (857 long tons) while submerged. She had a total length of 67.10 m (220 ft 2 in), a pressure hull length of 50.50 m (165 ft 8 in), a beam of 6.20 m (20 ft 4 in), a height of 9.60 m (31 ft 6 in), and a draught of 4.74 m (15 ft 7 in). The submarine was powered by two Germaniawerft F46 four-stroke, six-cylinder supercharged diesel engines producing a total of 2,800 to 3,200 metric horsepower (2,060 to 2,350 kW; 2,760 to 3,160 shp) for use while surfaced, two AEG GU 460/8–27 double-acting electric motors producing a total of 750 metric horsepower (550 kW; 740 shp) for use while submerged. She had two shafts and two 1.23 m (4 ft) propellers. The boat was capable of operating at depths of up to 230 metres (750 ft).

The submarine had a maximum surface speed of 17.7 knots (32.8 km/h; 20.4 mph) and a maximum submerged speed of 7.6 knots (14.1 km/h; 8.7 mph). When submerged, the boat could operate for 80 nautical miles (150 km; 92 mi) at 4 knots (7.4 km/h; 4.6 mph); when surfaced, she could travel 8,500 nautical miles (15,700 km; 9,800 mi) at 10 knots (19 km/h; 12 mph). U-364 was fitted with five 53.3 cm (21 in) torpedo tubes (four fitted at the bow and one at the stern), fourteen torpedoes, one 8.8 cm (3.46 in) SK C/35 naval gun, 220 rounds, and two twin 2 cm (0.79 in) C/30 anti-aircraft guns. The boat had a complement of between forty-four and sixty.

== Service history ==
The boat was built in Flensburg in 1942 and 1943, U-365 was a Type VIIC U-boat, with five torpedo tubes and a deck gun for smaller targets. She was captained by Kptlt. Haimar Wedemeyer, an efficient if slightly cautious officer, who worked his boat and crew up before being dispatched to the 9th Flotilla based at Bergen, Norway, whence she conducted her first three patrols.

=== War patrols ===
U-365's early operations were in support of clandestine operations in the North Sea and Arctic Ocean, in the course of which she saw no action against Allied shipping or positions. Not until her fifth patrol, following a shift in patrol zones to the frozen seas around Novaya Zemlya and transfer to the 13th U-boat Flotilla, that U-365 experienced success. In this region, on the 12 August, the boat spotted a small Soviet convoy and in rapid order sank a 7,540 GRT freighter and the two 625 tons minesweepers intended to protect it.

However, owing to the remoteness of the U-365's patrol zones, the caution of her commander and the efficiency of Allied submarine defences by the autumn of 1944, Wedemeyer was unable to score another victory for his boat in the next two patrols, and was eventually replaced by Oblt.z.S. Diether Todenhagen, who had previously served on the enormously successful U-48, and had a reputation as an aggressive submariner. This seemed deserved as on his first patrol, on the 6 December, he sank the tiny Soviet patrol ship BO-230 in the Barents Sea. This was followed five days later with a determined attack on an Allied convoy in which the British destroyer HMS Cassandra was seriously damaged. However, in orchestrating the attack the U-boat's position was revealed, and just two days later two Fairey Swordfish aircraft from 813 Squadron flying from the escort carrier HMS Campania spotted the submarine and sank her near the Lofoten Islands with bombs; all 50 of the U-boat's crew were lost.

=== Wolfpacks ===
U-365 took part in six wolfpacks, namely:

- Trutz (28 June – 10 July 1944)
- Greif (5 – 18 August 1944)
- Zorn (29 September – 1 October 1944)
- Grimm (1 – 2 October 1944)
- Panther (18 October – 8 November 1944)
- Stier (25 November – 13 December 1944)

== Summary of raiding history ==
Date	Ship Name	Nationality	Tonnage (Note: Merchant ship tonnages are in gross register tons. Military vessels are listed by tons displacement.)	Fate
12 August 1944	Marina Raskova	Soviet Union	7,540	Sunk
12 August 1944	T-118	Soviet Navy	625	Sunk
12 August 1944	T-114	Soviet Navy	625	Sunk
6 December 1944	BO-230	Soviet Navy	105	Sunk
11 December 1944	HMS Cassandra	Royal Navy	1,710	Damaged

== Bibliography ==
- Busch, Rainer; Röll, Hans-Joachim (1999). German U-boat commanders of World War II : a biographical dictionary. Translated by Brooks, Geoffrey. London, Annapolis, Md: Greenhill Books, Naval Institute Press. ISBN 1-55750-186-6.
- Busch, Rainer; Röll, Hans-Joachim (1999). Deutsche U-Boot-Verluste von September 1939 bis Mai 1945 [German U-boat losses from September 1939 to May 1945]. Der U-Boot-Krieg (in German). Vol. IV. Hamburg, Berlin, Bonn: Mittler. ISBN 3-8132-0514-2.
- Gröner, Erich; Jung, Dieter; Maass, Martin (1991). U-boats and Mine Warfare Vessels. German Warships 1815–1945. Vol. 2. Translated by Thomas, Keith; Magowan, Rachel. London: Conway Maritime Press. ISBN 0-85177-593-4.
- Sharpe, Peter (1998). U-Boat Fact File. Great Britain: Midland Publishing. ISBN 1-85780-072-9.
