= Italian cruiser Giovanni delle Bande Nere =

1930 Giussano-class cruiser

Coordinates: 38°42′32″N 15°0′31″E

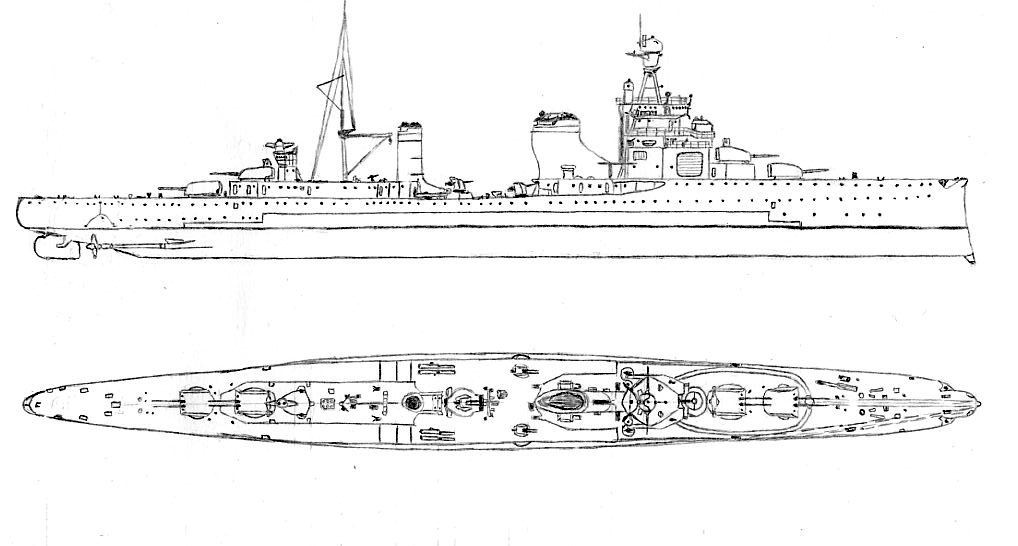
- Plan and profile sketch of the Giussano class

History

Italy
- Name: Giovanni delle Bande Nere
- Namesake: Giovanni dalle Bande Nere
- Builder: Regio Cantiere di Castellammare di Stabia
- Laid down: 31 October 1928
- Launched: 27 April 1930
- Commissioned: 1 January 1931
- Stricken: 1 April 1942
- Fate: Sunk, 1 April 1942

General characteristics
- Class & type: Giussano-class cruiser
- Displacement: Standard: 5,130 long tons (5,210 t); Full load: 6,844 long tons (6,954 t)
- Length: 169.3 m (555 ft 5 in) (loa)
- Beam: 15.5 m (50 ft 10 in)
- Draft: 5.3 m (17 ft 5 in)
- Installed power: 6 × water-tube boilers; 95,000 shp (71,000 kW)
- Propulsion: 2 × steam turbine sets; 2 × screw propellers
- Speed: 36.5 knots (67.6 km/h; 42.0 mph)
- Complement: 520
- Armament: 8 × 152 mm (6 in) guns; 6 × 100 mm (3.9 in) guns; 8 × 37 mm (1.5 in) AA guns; 8 × 13.2 mm (0.52 in) machine guns; 4 × 533 mm (21 in) torpedo tubes
- Armor: Decks: 20 mm (0.79 in); Belt: 24 mm (0.94 in); Turrets: 23 mm (0.91 in); Tower: 25 to 40 mm (0.98 to 1.57 in)
- Aircraft carried: 2 × seaplanes
- Aviation facilities: 1 × catapult launcher

Giovanni delle Bande Nere was an Italian light cruiser of the Giussano class, which served in the Regia Marina during World War II. She was named after the eponymous 16th-century condottiero and member of the Medici family. Her keel was laid down in 1928 at Cantieri Navali di Castellammare di Stabia, Castellammare di Stabia; she was launched on 27 April 1930, and her construction was completed in 1931. Unlike her three sisters, the finish and workmanship on the vessel were not rated highly. She was sunk on 1 April 1942 by the British submarine HMS Urge.

The Giussano type of cruiser sacrificed protection for high speed and weaponry, as a counter to new French large destroyers.

== Design ==
In the aftermath of World War I, the Italian Regia Marina (Royal Navy) received a group of light cruisers from the defeated German and Austro-Hungarian fleets. At the time, the Italian naval command was satisfied with these vessels as a supplement to their existing scout cruisers in the immediate postwar era. After the French Navy began building twelve large destroyers of the Chacal and Guépard classes, the Italian command responded by ordering the four Giussano-class cruisers. The Giussanos were intended to overpower the new French destroyers with superior armament and very high speed, at the expense of most armor protection.

Giovanni delle Bande Nere was 169.3 meters (555 ft 5 in) long overall, with a beam of 15.5 m (50 ft 10 in) and a draft of 5.3 m (17 ft 5 in). She displaced 5,130 long tons (5,210 t) at standard displacement and up to 6,844 long tons (6,954 t) at full load. The ship had a long forecastle deck that extended for the first third of the hull, before stepping down to the main deck that continued for the rest of the ship's length. Her hull was very lightly built to save weight. Her superstructure consisted of a large conning tower forward that incorporated a tripod mast and a smaller, secondary tower aft. She was fitted with an aircraft catapult on her forecastle, and could carry two reconnaissance aircraft; she initially carried CANT 25 seaplanes, but these were later replaced with IMAM Ro.43. She had a crew of 520 officers and enlisted men.

Her power plant consisted of two Belluzzo geared steam turbines powered by six oil-fired Yarrow boilers, which were ducted into two widely spaced funnels. The propulsion system was arranged on the unit system of machinery, which divided the engines and boilers into two separate pairs. Her engines were rated at 95,000 shaft horsepower (71,000 kW) and produced a top speed of 36.5 knots (67.6 km/h; 42.0 mph). During her sea trials, she reached a top speed of 38.2 knots (70.7 km/h; 44.0 mph) from 101,231 ihp (75,488 kW), though in service she could only maintain a speed of 30 knots (56 km/h; 35 mph) at sea.

Giovanni delle Bande Nere was armed with a main battery of eight 152 mm (6 in) Mod 26 53-caliber guns in four gun turrets. The turrets were arranged in superfiring pairs forward and aft. Anti-aircraft defense was provided by a battery of six 100 mm (4 in) 47-cal. guns in twin mounts, eight 37 mm (1.5 in) /54 guns in twin mounts, and eight 13.2 mm (0.52 in) guns in twin mounts. Her armament was rounded out by four 533 mm (21 in) torpedo tubes in two twin launchers on the main deck amidships.

The ship's armor belt was 24 mm (0.94 in) thick, extending only for the length of the hull that contained the propulsion machinery spaces and the ammunition magazines. The belt was closed on either end by 20 mm (0.79 in) transverse bulkheads and was capped by an armor deck of the same thickness. Inboard of the belt, an 18 mm (0.71 in) thick inner bulkhead was intended to catch shell fragments that penetrated the main belt. The main battery turrets received 23 mm (0.91 in) of protection, and her conning tower received 25 to 40 mm (0.98 to 1.57 in) of armor plate.

== Service ==
Giovanni delle Bande Nere was built at the Regio Cantiere di Castellammare di Stabia (Royal Shipyard of Castellammare di Stabia); her keel was laid down on 31 October 1928, the last member of the class to begin construction. She was launched on 27 April 1930, and work on the ship was completed in April 1931. During the Spanish Civil War, Giovanni delle Bande Nere operated in the western Mediterranean as part of the non-intervention patrols intended to block arms shipments to the warring factions. Later in the decade, the ship served with the Training Command.

=== World War II ===
On 10 June 1940, Italy declare war on Britain and France, entering World War II on the side of Germany. At that time, Giovanni dalle Bande Nere was assigned to II Division of II Squadron, along with her sister ship Bartolomeo Colleoni. She served as the divisional flagship under Rear Admiral Ferdinando Casardi. The two ships were moved to Palermo, Sicily, and on the evening of 10 June, they sortied to lay mines in the Strait of Sicily. On 22 June, the two cruisers departed to search for French ships that were reportedly west of Sardinia, but they returned to port two days later, having failed to locate any French vessels. By the end of the month, France had signed the Armistice of Villa Incisa, ending their participation in the war. As a result, Giovanni dalle Bande Nere and Bartolomeo Colleoni were moved to Augusta in eastern Sicily. On 2–3 July, the ships carried another sweep that failed to locate any British ships, and the next day they covered a convoy from Tripoli in Italian Libya to Italy.

On 7 July, Giovanni dalle Bande Nere and Bartolomeo Colleoni sortied as part of the escort for a large convoy sailing to Benghazi in Libya. The convoy consisted of five freighters and a passenger liner that were carrying some 2,200 men, 72 tanks, 237 other vehicles, and a large amount of supplies and fuel; these were intended to fortify the planned invasion of Egypt. II Division, along with the 10th Destroyer Squadron (which consisted of Maestrale, Libeccio, Grecale, and Scirocco) and the torpedo boats Pegaso, Orione, Orsa, Procione, Abba, and Pilo, formed the convoy's close escort. Significant elements of the Italian fleet were at sea as part of the convoy, which the British attempted to intercept. In the ensuing Battle of Calabria on 9 July, the ships of II Division were assigned to make sure the convoy arrived in port undamaged. The convoy arrived in Benghazi the next day, but Giovanni dalle Bande Nere and Bartolomeo Colleoni soon moved to Tripoli to avoid attacks from British aircraft based in Egypt. The Italian naval command considered sending the two cruisers to bombard British positions on the coast at Sollum, but decided against it; instead, they were to be sent to Portolago in the Dodecanese. From there, they were to attack British convoys in the Aegean Sea.

==== Battle of Cape Spada ====
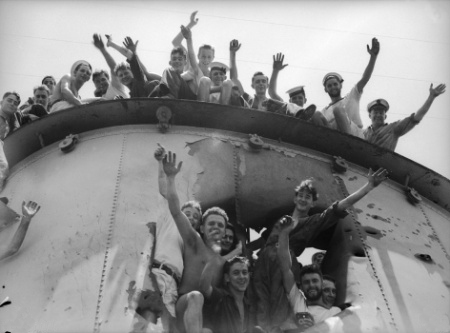
Crewmen from HMAS Sydney after the battle, posing in the shell hit from Giovanni delle Bande Nere

Giovanni dalle Bande Nere and Bartolomeo Colleoni left Tripoli on the evening of 17 July and sailed to the north of Crete, bound for the Aegean. On the 19th, the four British destroyers HMS Hyperion, Ilex, Hero, and Hasty were sent on an anti-submarine patrol in the area, while the Australian light cruiser HMAS Sydney and the British destroyer Havock searched the Gulf of Athens. At around 06:00 on 19 July, the Italians spotted the four British destroyers off Cape Spada of western Crete, which were some 17,000 m (19,000 yd) away; Sydney and Havock were around 60 nautical miles (110 km; 69 mi) to the north. The British ships immediately signaled Sydney and turned to flee at high speed. Casardi ordered his ships to pursue the retreating British ships, believing them to be part of the escort for a convoy he hoped to attack. At 06:27, the Italian cruisers opened fire on the destroyers, but the faster destroyers were able to pull out of range without having been hit. (Note: The times in this section are sometimes reported an hour ahead, presumably due to the use of different time zones, depending on the Italian or British perspective. For example, Greene and Massignani report the opening of fire as 07:27, rather than at 06:27, as reported by Gay & Gay or O'Hara.) At around this time, a Greek freighter passed between the formations but quickly withdrew from the area.

Casardi pursued the British blindly, deciding not to launch any of his reconnaissance aircraft (both because of the sea state and not wanting to slow down to launch them), and he was also not supported by any land based aircraft in the area. As a result, they had no way to know that Sydney was in the area, and when she arrived on the scene at around 07:30 and opened fire, it took the Italians completely by surprise. The Australian cruiser had opened fire from a range of about 12,000 m (13,000 yd) while in the middle of a fog bank; almost immediately, she hit Giovanni dalle Bande Nere near her aft funnel. This hit killed four men on the deck and wounded four more. The Italian cruisers quickly returned fire, but had difficulty locating the target in the fog, as they only had Sydney's muzzle flashes to aim at. They also rolled badly in the heavy seas, which further hampered their gun laying. Captain Collins of Sydney detached Havock to join the other destroyers, Collins ordered to make a torpedo attack on the cruisers. Casardi responded by turning his ships south and then southwest to move to less restricted waters further from Crete. As the Italians withdrew, Sydney alternated fire between the two cruisers, depending on which was more visible, but she focused her fire on Bartolomeo Colleoni, as she was generally closer.

At 08:24, Sydney struck Bartolomeo Colleoni with a salvo of 152 mm shells that inflicted serious damage. The latter fell behind, which allowed the destroyers to enter effective range, and the British ships quickly neutralized Bartolomeo Colleoni. One of the destroyers hit her with a torpedo that blew off her bow. Shortly thereafter, Casardi circled back at 08:50 to attempt to come to her aid, but quickly determined that the situation was hopeless, so he turned back to the west and fled at high speed. Sydney, Hero, and Hasty turned to pursue Giovanni delle Bande Nere while the remaining destroyers finished off Bartolomeo Colleoni and then picked up survivors. During the pursuit, Sydney hit Giovanni delle Bande Nere once, which killed four men and wounded another twelve, and in response, Giovanni delle Bande Nere hit Sydney once. By 09:37, the Italian cruiser had pulled far enough away from Sydney that she broke off the chase. Giovanni delle Bande Nere thereafter returned to port at Benghazi.

==== Subsequent operations ====
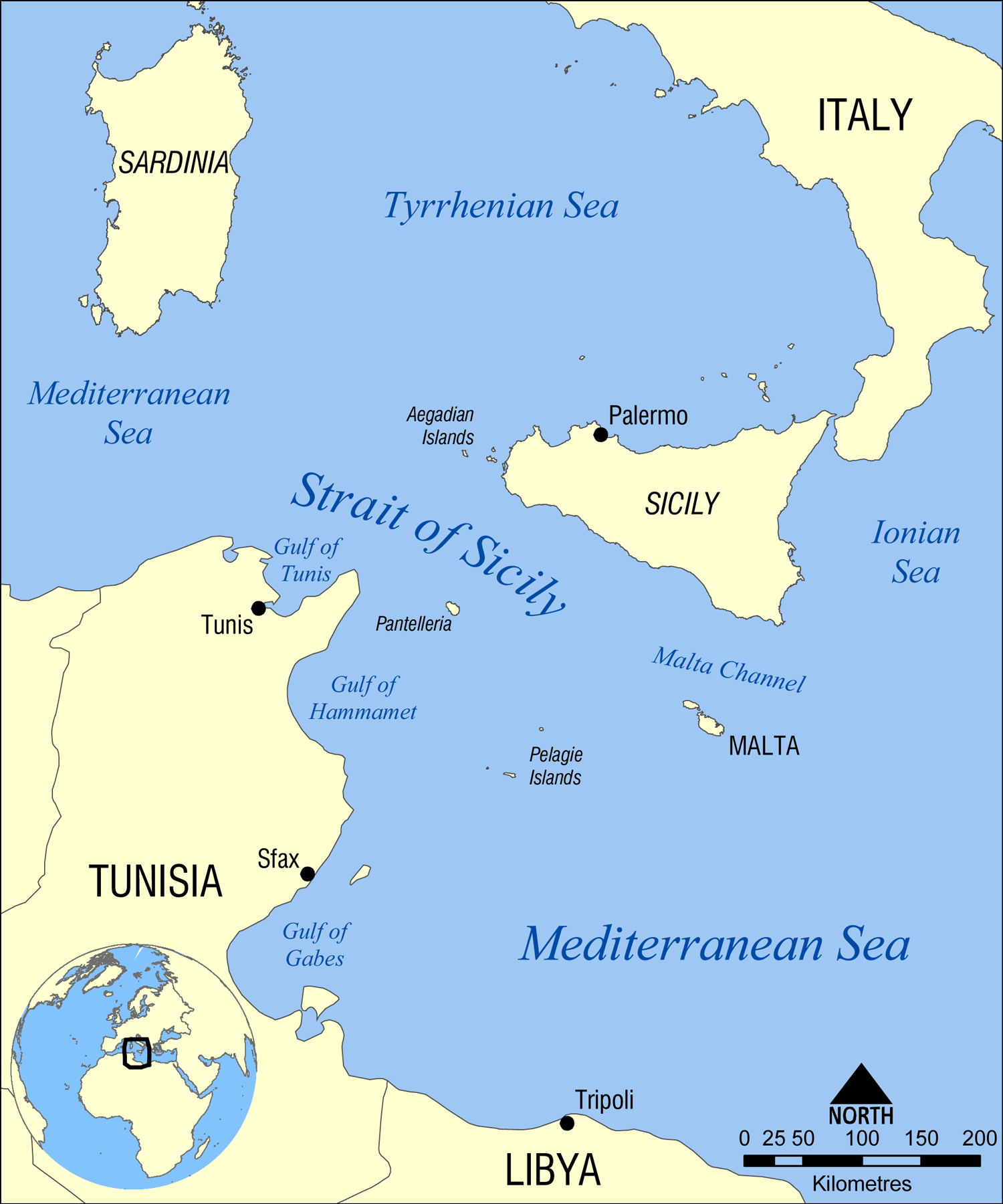
The central Mediterranean, where Giovanni delle Bande Bere spent most of the war

Giovanni delle Bande Bere joined the 4th Division on 4 December, and over the following months she escorted several convoys to North Africa, including operations with fast passenger liners. She also participated in attempts to block British convoys to Malta during this period. On 8 May 1941, Giovanni delle Bande Nere took part in attack against the Operation Tiger convoy to Malta and Egypt. The British sent a convoy of five fast merchant ships carrying tanks and Hawker Hurricane fighters across the Mediterranean to Alexandria, while at the same time running another convoy from Alexandria to supply Malta in the central Mediterranean. The Italian squadron also included the light squadrons Luigi Cadorna, Luigi di Savoia Duca degli Abruzzi, and Giuseppe Garibaldi, along with five destroyers. Unknown to the Italians, the British convoy was escorted by the battleship HMS Queen Elizabeth, along with other vessels; luckily for both sides, neither encountered the in bad weather.

In June 1941, Giovanni delle Bande Nere and her sister Alberto di Giussano laid a defensive minefield off Tripoli. This minefield later sank the British cruiser HMS Neptune and the destroyer Kandahar and damaged the cruisers Penelope and Aurora in December. The Italian cruisers laid additional minefields in the Strait of Sicily in July. Giovanni delle Bande Nere became the flagship of the Special Naval Force on 20 October.

In December, the Italian high command decided to use light cruisers and destroyers to conduct high-speed resupply missions to North Africa. On 9 December, Giovanni delle Bande Nere and the rest of 4th Division—her sisters Alberto di Giussano and Alberico da Barbiano—were sent with 950 long tons (970 t) of fuel and 900 long tons (910 t) of other supplies apiece. They departed from Palermo]that morning, but had only gotten about halfway between Sicily and Tunisia by the next morning, when they were spotted by reconnaissance aircraft from Malta. They then came under air attack from British torpedo bombers, which forced them to abandon the attempt and return to Palermo. Giovanni delle Bande Nere's engines developed problems before the next attempt was made on 12 December, so the other two cruisers proceeded without her. This time, the two cruisers were intercepted by a group of British destroyers and were both sunk.

On 3 January 1942, Giovanni delle Bande Nere was transferred to the 8th Cruiser Division. In February, she was part of the escort force for Operation K7, which saw convoys from Corfu and Messina to Tripoli.

==== Second Battle of Sirte ====
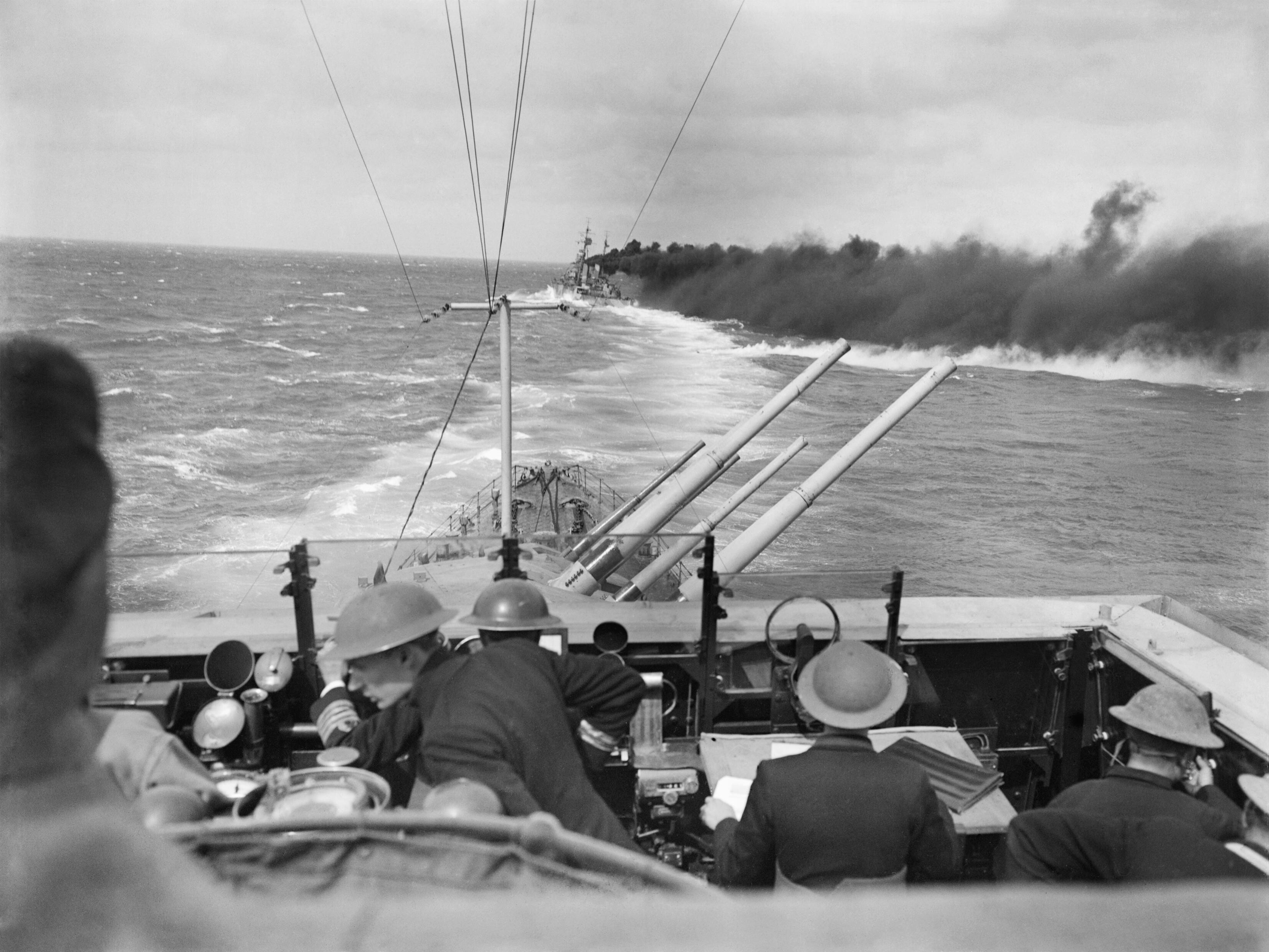
The British cruiser HMS Cleopatra, seen from HMS Euryalus, during the Second Battle of Sirte

On 21 March 1942, the Italian submarine Platino detected the British convoy MW.10 sailing west from Alexandria. The convoy had sailed the day before to carry supplies to Malta. On the evening of 21 March, the Italian naval command—the Supermarina—activated a group of cruisers that included Giovanni delle Bande Nere to try to intercept the convoy. The squadron, which also included the heavy cruisers Gorizia and Trento, along with an escort of four destroyers, was based at Messina and was under the command of Rear Admiral Angelo Parona. The ships were to rendezvous with the fast battleship Littorio and another four destroyers, which had sailed from Taranto. The British were aware of the departure of the Littorio group, and they turned slightly south to try to avoid them, but the arrival of the cruiser group surprised them (though the British spotted the Italian ships first).

In the ensuing Second Battle of Sirte, Parona made a dilatory approach, first turning north and then describing a large circle to starboard before eventually ordering his ships to fire at 14:56 at the convoy escort that had steamed to engage them, albeit at very long range. Neither side scored any hits, though Giovanni delle Bande Nere straddled the British cruisers HMS Cleopatra and Euryalus before Parona broke off the engagement at 15:15. The Italian squadrons then formed up, with the cruisers in the lead, and at 16:37, they again closed with the convoy escort in an attempt to block their route to Malta. By 16:43, Giovanni delle Bande Nere had engaged Cleopatra and Euryalus for the second time, and she scored a hit on the former, disabling her radio and killing fifteen men. Soon thereafter, Littorio joined the engagement, which forced the British cruisers and destroyers to fall back, but the Italians still could not see the convoy in the heavy smoke screens. As darkness approached, the Italian fleet broke off, having been ordered to avoid a night engagement.

While withdrawing to port on 23 March, the Italian fleet encountered severe storms, and Giovanni delle Bande Nere suffered damage. After the ship returned to Messina, it was decided to send her to La Spezia for repairs, and she departed on 1 April, with the destroyer Aviere and the torpedo boat Libra as escorts. The ships were intercepted by the British submarine Urge about eleven miles to the southeast of Stromboli; Urge hit Giovanni delle Bande Nere with two torpedoes, which inflicted serious damage. Her hull broke into two sections, and she quickly sank.

== Discovery ==
On 9 March 2019, the Italian Navy reported that the minesweeper Vieste had discovered the wreck of Giovanni delle Bande Nere. Vieste used remotely operated vehicles (ROV) Hugin 1000 and Multipluto 03 to search for the wreck. The ROVs obtained images of the wreck that confirm the ship broke into three sections as it sank. From photos shown, at least part of the cruiser lies on its port side at a depth of 1,460 to 1,730 m (4,790 to 5,680 ft) of water.
