= Italian cruiser Bartolomeo Colleoni =

Light cruiser (1932–1940)

Coordinates: 35°41′34″N 23°43′14″E

- Bartolomeo Colleoni passing through the Suez Canal in 1935

History

Italy
- Name: Bartolomeo Colleoni
- Namesake: Bartolomeo Colleoni
- Ordered: 1926
- Builder: Ansaldo, Genoa
- Laid down: 21 June 1928
- Launched: 21 December 1930
- Commissioned: 10 February 1932
- Fate: Sunk by HMAS Sydney and others at the Battle of Cape Spada, 19 July 1940

General characteristics
- Class & type: Giussano-class cruiser
- Displacement: Standard: 5,130 long tons (5,210 t); Full load: 6,844 long tons (6,954 t)
- Length: 169.3 m (555 ft 5 in) (loa)
- Beam: 15.5 m (50 ft 10 in)
- Draft: 5.3 m (17 ft 5 in)
- Installed power: 6 × water-tube boilers; 95,000 shp (71,000 kW)
- Propulsion: 2 × steam turbine sets; 2 × screw propellers
- Speed: 36.5 knots (67.6 km/h; 42.0 mph)
- Complement: 520
- Armament: 8 × 152 mm (6 in) guns; 6 × 100 mm (3.9 in) guns; 8 × 37 mm (1.5 in) AA guns; 8 × 13.2 mm (0.52 in) machine guns; 4 × 533 mm (21 in) torpedo tubes
- Armor: Decks: 20 mm (0.79 in); Belt: 24 mm (0.94 in); Turrets: 23 mm (0.91 in); Tower: 25 to 40 mm (0.98 to 1.57 in)
- Aircraft carried: 2 × seaplanes
- Aviation facilities: 1 × catapult launcher

Bartolomeo Colleoni was an Italian Giussano-class light cruiser that served in the Regia Marina (Royal Navy) during World War II. She was named after Bartolomeo Colleoni, an Italian military leader of the 15th century.

She was sunk at the Battle of Cape Spada early in the war.

== Design ==
In the aftermath of World War I, the Italian Regia Marina (Royal Navy) received a group of light cruisers from the defeated German and Austro-Hungarian fleets. At the time, the Italian naval command was satisfied with these vessels as a supplement to their existing scout cruisers in the immediate postwar era. After the French Navy began building twelve large destroyers of the Chacal and Guépard classes, the Italian command responded by ordering the four Giussano-class cruisers. The Giussanos were intended to overpower the new French destroyers with superior armament and very high speed at the expense of most armor protection.

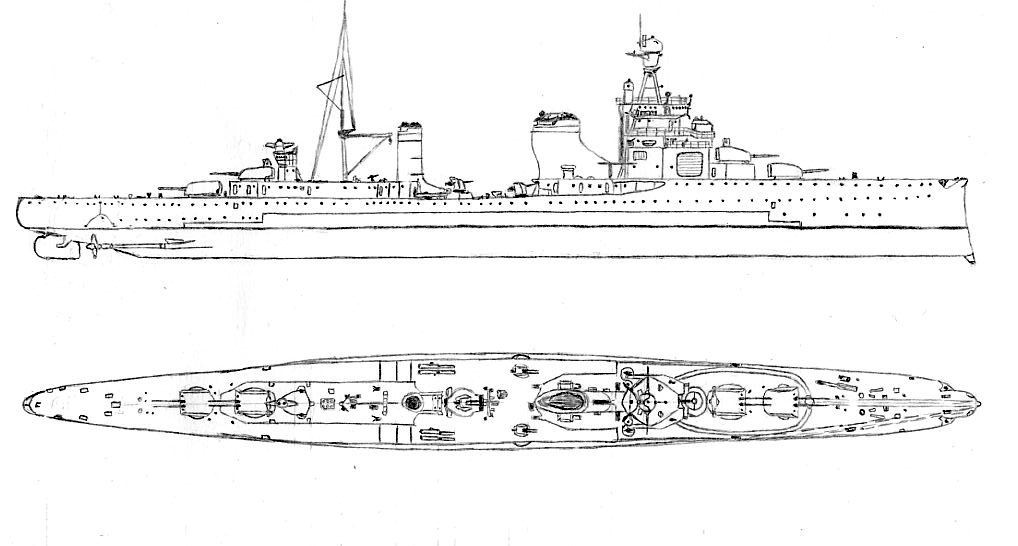
Profile sketch of the Giussano-class

Bartolomeo Colleoni was 169.3 meters (555 ft 5 in) long overall with a beam of 15.5 m (50 ft 10 in) and a draft of 5.3 m (17 ft 5 in). She displaced 5,170 long tons (5,250 t) at standard displacement and up to 6,844 long tons (6,954 t) at full load. The ship had a long forecastle deck that extended for the first third of the hull before stepping down to the main deck that continued for the rest of the ship's length. Her hull was very lightly built to save weight. Her superstructure consisted of a large conning tower forward that incorporated a tripod mast and a smaller, secondary tower aft. She was fitted with an aircraft catapult on her forecastle and could carry two reconnaissance aircraft; she initially carried CANT 25 seaplanes, but these were later replaced with IMAM Ro.43. She had a crew of 520 officers and enlisted men.

Her power plant consisted of two Belluzzo geared steam turbines powered by six oil-fired Yarrow boilers, which were ducted into two widely spaced funnels. The propulsion system was arranged on the unit system of machinery, which divided the engines and boilers into two separate pairs. Her engines were rated at 95,000 shaft horsepower (71,000 kW) and produced a top speed of 36.5 knots (67.6 km/h; 42.0 mph). During her sea trials, she reached a top speed of 39.9 knots (73.9 km/h; 45.9 mph) from 119,177 ihp (88,870 kW), though in service she could only maintain a speed of 30 knots (56 km/h; 35 mph) at sea.

Bartolomeo Colleoni was armed with a main battery of eight 152 mm (6 in) Mod 26 53-caliber guns in four gun turrets. The turrets were arranged in superfiring pairs forward and aft. Anti-aircraft defense was provided by a battery of six 100 mm (4 in) 47-cal. guns in twin mounts, eight 37 mm (1.5 in) /54 guns in twin mounts, and eight 13.2 mm (0.52 in) guns in twin mounts. Her armament was rounded out by four 533 mm (21 in) torpedo tubes in two twin launchers on the main deck amidships.

The ship's armor belt was 24 mm (0.94 in) thick, extending only for the length of the hull that contained the propulsion machinery spaces and the ammunition magazines. The belt was closed on either end by 20 mm (0.79 in) transverse bulkheads and was capped by an armor deck of the same thickness. Inboard of the belt, an 18 mm (0.71 in) thick inner bulkhead was intended to catch shell fragments that penetrated the main belt. The main battery turrets received 23 mm (0.91 in) of protection, and her conning tower received 25 to 40 mm (0.98 to 1.57 in) of armor plate.

== Service history ==
Bartolomeo Colleoni in Shanghai in 1939

Bartolomeo Colleoni was built by the Gio. Ansaldo & C. shipyard in Genoa, Italy. She was laid down on 21 June 1928, and was named after the Condottiero Bartolomeo Colleoni. Her completed hull was launched on 21 December 1930. She was completed on 10 February 1932, and upon entering service, she was assigned to the II Naval Squadron, which was based at La Spezia. After the outbreak of the Spanish Civil War in 1936, the fascist Italian government began aiding their fellow fascists in the Nationalist faction under Francisco Franco. Bartolomeo Colleoni departed Italy on 5 September and arrived in Barcelona on 3 October, where she protected Italian nationals in the area. Over the course of January and February 1937, she escorted four convoys carrying soldiers and supplies to support Franco's forces. During this period, she also patrolled off ports controlled by the Republican faction to block supply shipments going to Franco's opponents.

After the start of the Second Sino-Japanese War in 1937, Italy and other European powers began to strengthen their forces in East Asia. In November 1938, Bartolomeo Colleoni was dispatched to relieve the light cruiser Raimondo Montecuccoli. Bartolomeo Colleoni arrived in Shanghai on 23 December; the port there was under Japanese occupation. The ship cruised in Chinese waters for nearly a year, until October 1939, when she was recalled home in response to the start of World War II in September. She left behind the sloop Lepanto to protect Italian interests in China Bartolomeo Colleoni arrived in Italy on 28 October.

=== World War II ===
On 10 June 1940, Italy declared war on Britain and France, entering World War II on the side of Germany. At that time, Bartolomeo Colleoni was assigned to II Division of II Squadron, along with her sister ship Giovanni delle Bande Nere. The two ships were moved to Palermo, Sicily, and on the evening of 10 June, they sortied to lay mines in the Strait of Sicily. On 22 June, the two cruisers departed to search for French ships that were reportedly west of Sardinia, but they returned to port two days later, having failed to locate any French vessels. By the end of the month, France had signed the Armistice of Villa Incisa, ending their participation in the war. As a result, Bartolomeo Colleoni and Giovanni delle Bande Nere were moved to Augusta in eastern Sicily. On 2–3 July, the ships carried another sweep that failed to locate any British ships, and the next day they covered a convoy from Tripoli in Italian Libya to Italy.

On 7 July, Bartolomeo Colleoni and Giovanni delle Bande Nere sortied as part of the escort for a large convoy sailing to Benghazi in Libya. The convoy consisted of five freighters and a passenger liner that were carrying some 2,200 men, 72 tanks, 237 other vehicles, and a large amount of supplies and fuel; these were intended to fortify the planned invasion of Egypt. II Division, along with the 10th Destroyer Squadron (which consisted of Maestrale, Libeccio, Grecale, and Scirocco) and the torpedo boats Pegaso, Orione, Orsa, Procione, Abba, and Pilo, formed the convoy's close escort. Significant elements of the Italian fleet were at sea as part of the convoy, which the British attempted to intercept. In the ensuing Battle of Calabria on 9 July, the ships of II Division were assigned to make sure the convoy arrived in port undamaged. The convoy arrived in Benghazi the next day, but Bartolomeo Colleoni and Giovanni delle Bande Nere soon moved to Tripoli to avoid attacks from British aircraft based in Egypt. The Italian naval command considered sending the two cruisers to bombard British positions on the coast at Sollum, but decided against it; instead, they were to be sent to Portolago in the Dodecanese. From there, they were to attack British convoys in the Aegean Sea.

==== Battle of Cape Spada ====
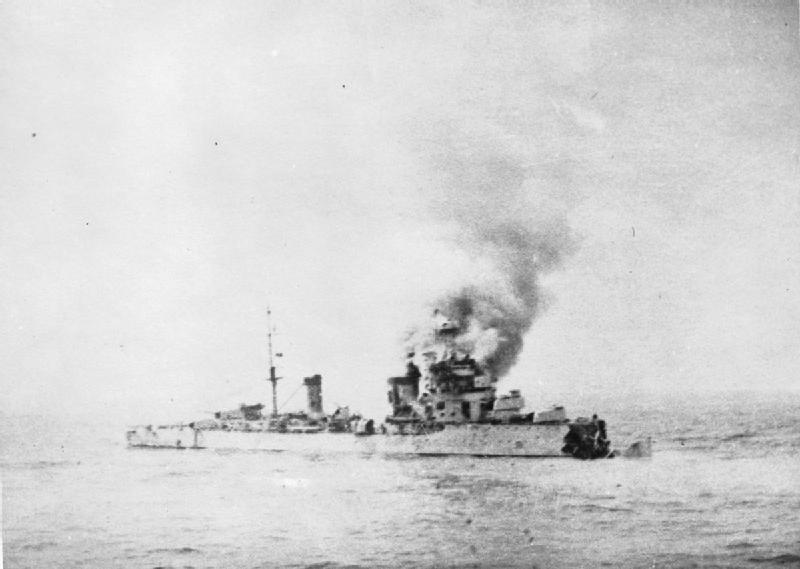
Bartolomeo Colleoni during the action with HMAS Sydney

Bartolomeo Colleoni and Giovanni delle Bande Nere left Tripoli on the evening of 17 July and sailed to the north of Crete, bound for the Aegean. On the 19th, the four British destroyers HMS Hyperion, Ilex, Hero, and Hasty were sent on an anti-submarine patrol in the area, while the Australian light cruiser HMAS Sydney and the British destroyer Havock searched the Gulf of Athens. At around 06:00 on 19 July, the Italians spotted the four British destroyers off Cape Spada of western Crete, which were some 17,000 m (19,000 yd) away; Sydney and Havock were around 60 nautical miles (110 km; 69 mi) to the north. The British ships immediately signaled Sydney and turned to flee at high speed. The Italian commander, Rear Admiral Ferdinando Casardi aboard Giovanni delle Bande Nere, ordered his ships to pursue the retreating British ships, believing them to be part of the escort for a convoy he hoped to attack. At 06:27, the Italian cruisers opened fire on the destroyers, but the faster destroyers were able to pull out of range without having been hit. (Note: The times in this section are sometimes reported an hour ahead, presumably due to the use of different time zones, depending on the Italian or British perspective. For example, Greene and Massignani report the opening of fire as 07:27, rather than at 06:27, as reported by Gay & Gay or O'Hara.) At around this time, a Greek freighter passed between the formations but quickly withdrew from the area.

Casardi pursued the British blindly, deciding not to launch any of his reconnaissance aircraft (both because of the sea state and not wanting to slow down to launch them), and he was also not supported by any land based aircraft in the area. As a result, they had no way to know that Sydney was in the area, and when she arrived on the scene at around 07:30 and opened fire, it took the Italians completely by surprise. The Australian cruiser had opened fire from a range of about 12,000 m (13,000 yd) while in the middle of a fog bank; almost immediately, she hit Giovanni delle Bande Nere near her aft funnel. The Italian cruisers quickly returned fire, but had difficulty locating the target in the fog, as they only had Sydney's muzzle flashes to aim at. They also rolled badly in the heavy seas, which further hampered their gun laying. Captain Collins of Sydney detached Havock to join the other destroyers, Collins ordered to make a torpedo attack on the cruisers. Casardi responded by turning his ships south and then southwest to move to less restricted waters further from Crete. As the Italians withdrew, Sydney alternated fire between the two cruisers, depending on which was more visible, but she focused her fire on Bartolomeo Colleoni, as she was generally closer.

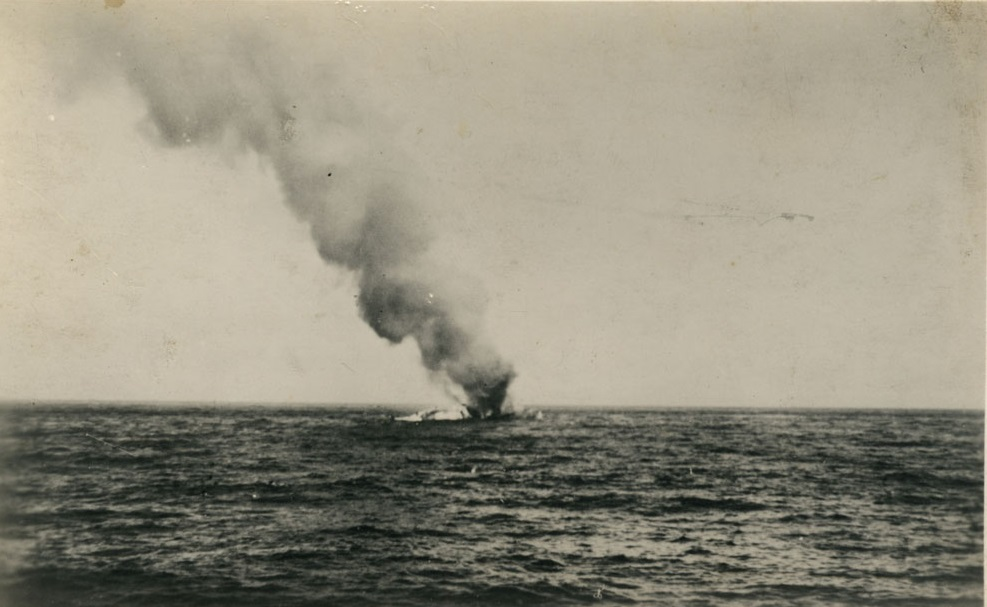
Bartolomeo Colleoni, sinking

At 08:24, Sydney struck Bartolomeo Colleoni with a salvo of 152 mm shells; one of the rounds jammed her rudder in the neutral position. The ship was now unable to steer, but she remained on the course she had been steaming. Shortly thereafter, another salvo from Sydney hit the ship amidships, causing extensive damage and starting several fires. One shell struck her conning tower and killed much of the bridge crew. The ship lost speed, which allowed the British destroyers to come into range. Further hits disabled two of the boilers and destroyed the main steam condenser, which was used to feed water back into the boilers. Without water to boil, the engines quickly shut down, leaving Bartolomeo Colleoni dead in the water. The ammunition hoists for her main battery guns were also disabled. Her 100 mm guns kept firing, as they could be operated manually. Within six minutes of the first hit, the ship had been effectively neutralized and Captain Umberto Novaro issued the order to abandon ship.

At about that time, Ilex and Havock closed to launch torpedoes at the stricken cruiser, though their initial attacks missed. Hyperion joined the two destroyers, which had launched a further round of torpedoes, one of which hit Bartolomeo Colleoni. The torpedo, from Ilex, struck forward and blew off the first 30 m (98 ft) of her bow. Casardi circled back at 08:50 to attempt to come to her aid, but quickly determined that the situation was hopeless, so he turned back to the west and fled at high speed. Hyperion then launched a torpedo that struck amidships. The second hit caused serious flooding, and Bartolomeo Colleoni quickly capsized and sank. Sydney, Hero, and Hasty continued the pursuit of Giovanni delle Bande Nere, but Ilex, Havock, and Hyperion approached the area where survivors from Bartolomeo Colleoni were floating. They picked up 525 men, of whom eight died of their wounds and were buried at sea. The British had to suspend rescue efforts when Italian bombers appeared and attacked the ships. A further fifty men attempted to swim to the coast of Crete, but only seven survived to be picked up by a Greek fishing boat. Four more men, including captain Novaro, died aboard the hospital ship Maine at Alexandria, Egypt. These men were buried there, and the captains of Sydney and the destroyers served as the pallbearers. In total, 121 out of a crew of 643 were killed in the sinking.

In their assessment of the battle, the naval historians Jack Greene and Alessandro Massignani note that Casardi had been too cautious in the initial stage of the battle, and that if he had closed to attack the destroyers, he might have defeated them. Instead, he chose to fire at long range to keep his cruisers far enough away that the destroyers would not be able to return fire. They also point out that Italian gunnery was less accurate than their British counterparts, which compounded Casardi's decision to fight at long range. Lastly, they suggested that the Italians might have had a better outcome if they had sent a stronger force, instead of just the two light cruisers. The naval historian Vincent O'Hara pointed out that the Italian cruisers fired some 500 shells between the two of them, scoring one hit on Sydney, while the latter vessel had fired around 1,300 shells alone and scored five hits, noting that the better British shooting was the result of a much higher volume of fire.
