= Battle of Cape Spada =

1940 naval battle of World War II

Coordinates: 35°41′34″N 23°43′14″E

- Part of the Battle of the Mediterranean of the Second World War
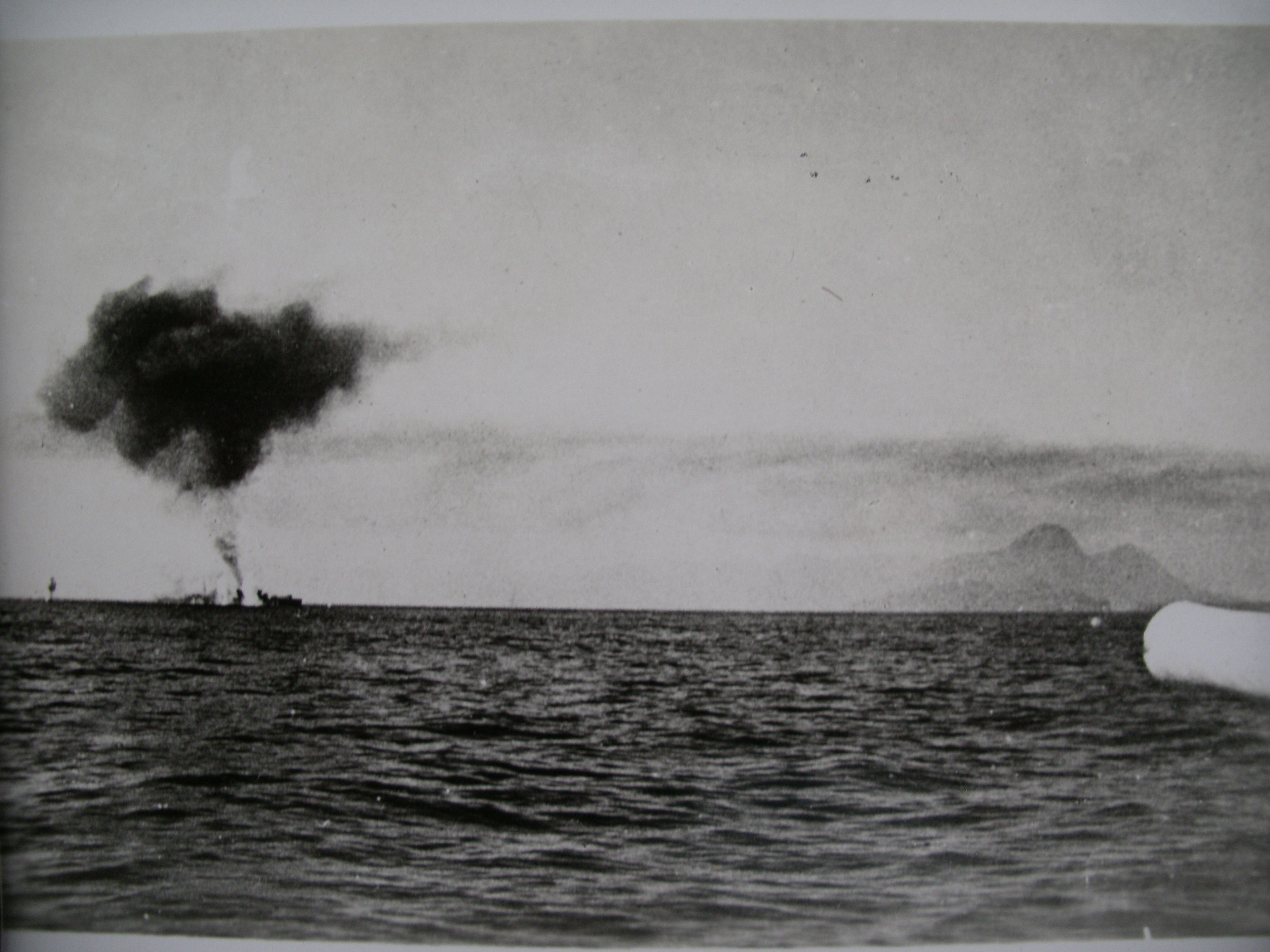
- Bartolomeo Colleoni sinking, 19 July 1940
Date	19 July 1940
Location	Off Crete, Mediterranean Sea
Result	British victory

Belligerents
United Kingdom	Italy

Commanders and leaders
John Collins	Ferdinando Casardi

Strength
1 Australian light cruiser; 5 British destroyers	2 light cruisers

Casualties and losses
1 wounded; 1 light cruiser damaged	121 killed; 555 captured; 1 light cruiser sunk

The Battle of Cape Spada (Battaglia di Capo Spada) was a naval battle between the Royal Navy and the Regia Marina during the Battle of the Mediterranean in the second World War. It took place during the morning of 19 July 1940 off Cape Spada, the north-western extremity of Crete.

The Italian 2ª Divisione Incrociatori (2nd Cruiser Division) comprised the fast light cruisers Giovanni delle Bande Nere and Bartolomeo Colleoni. In a meeting encounter it engaged the Royal Navy's 2nd Destroyer Flotilla and the independently sailing light cruiser HMAS Sydney and destroyer HMS Havock.

During the battle Bartolomeo Colleoni was sunk and Giovanni delle Bande Nere damaged, with minor damage inflicted on Sydney. There were 555 survivors from Bartolomeo Colleoni but 121 men were killed. Capitano di vascello Umberto Novaro was mortally wounded and died on 23 July.

== Prelude ==
The action occurred during a relocation of the 2nd Cruiser Division to Leros, whence it was supposed to conduct raids on Allied shipping passing the Aegean. During the move from Tripoli to Leros, an Italian colony in the Dodecanese Islands, the two Italian cruisers encountered the Royal Navy's 2nd Destroyer Flotilla and began a high-speed chase.

The Royal Navy forces were commanded by Captain John Collins (Royal Australian Navy, RAN) aboard the light cruiser HMAS Sydney with her escort and the 2nd Destroyer Flotilla consisting of H-class destroyers HMS Havock (escort), Hyperion, Hasty, Hero and the similar I-class destroyer Ilex. The Italian 2ª Divisione Incrociatori (2nd Cruiser Division) Ammiraglio di divisione (Vice-Admiral) Ferdinando Casardi, comprised the fast light cruisers Giovanni delle Bande Nere (Admiral's ship) and Bartolomeo Colleoni.

== Battle ==
When the Italians encountered the British destroyers at about 07:30 (06.30 Italian time), Sydney and Havock were 40 nmi (74 km; 46 mi) to the north on a sweep for submarines. The other destroyers led the Italian cruisers on a chase northwards to give Sydney time to come to the rescue. Sydney sighted the Italians at 08:26, opening fire at 08:29, and the Italian cruisers turned away to the south-west. In the chase that followed, Bartolomeo Colleoni was hit several times by Sydney and a shell went through her thinly armoured hull; the boilers and guns were disabled at 09:23, leaving her dead in the water.

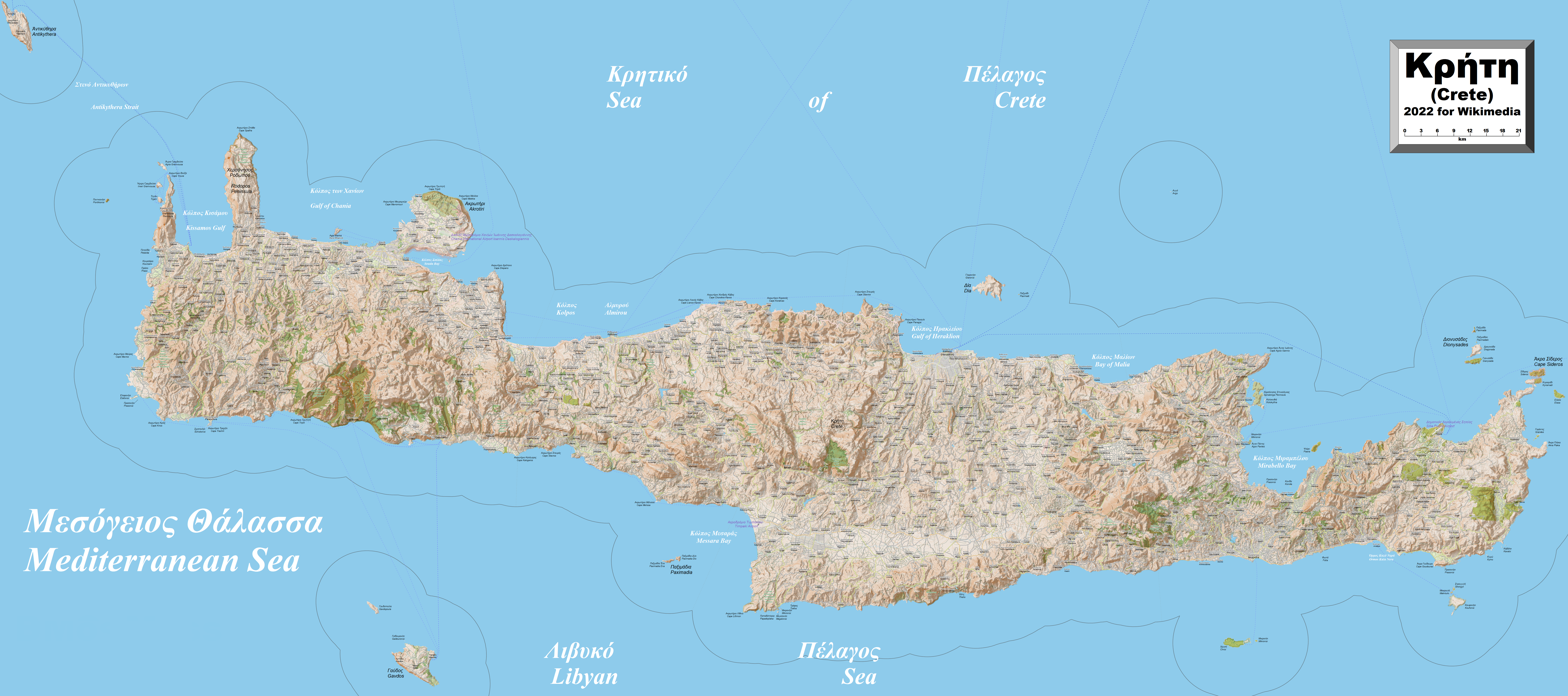
Map of Crete, Capa Spada, a peninsula to the north-west (enlargeable)

The crew of Bartolomeo Colleoni fought on but were unable to manoeuvre or use the main armament; despite the fire from her 100 mm (3.9 in) guns, she was sunk by three torpedoes launched from Ilex and Hyperion at 09:59. Sydney continued to engage Bande Nere who now withdrew from the battle. Sydney was hit in the funnel by an Italian shell but hit Bande Nere at least twice, killing eight in the bow and the hangar. After an hour-long chase, Sydney, Hero and Hasty disengaged because the cruiser was short of ammunition and Bande Nere was drawing away from them. The Italian cruiser returned to Benghazi by 20.00 hours, shadowed by the battleship HMS Warspite and a screen of destroyers.

Despite their speed advantage, the Italian cruisers could not outrun Sydney initially because they had to steer south-southwest, instead of the most obvious route of escape to the south, to avoid being trapped between their opponents and the Cretan coast. This gave the Australian cruiser the chance to close the range. The light armour of Colleoni and Bande Nere was unable to withstand Sydney's shells. The lack of aerial reconnaissance was another factor contributing to the successful Commonwealth chase.

Bartolomeo Colleoni in 1935

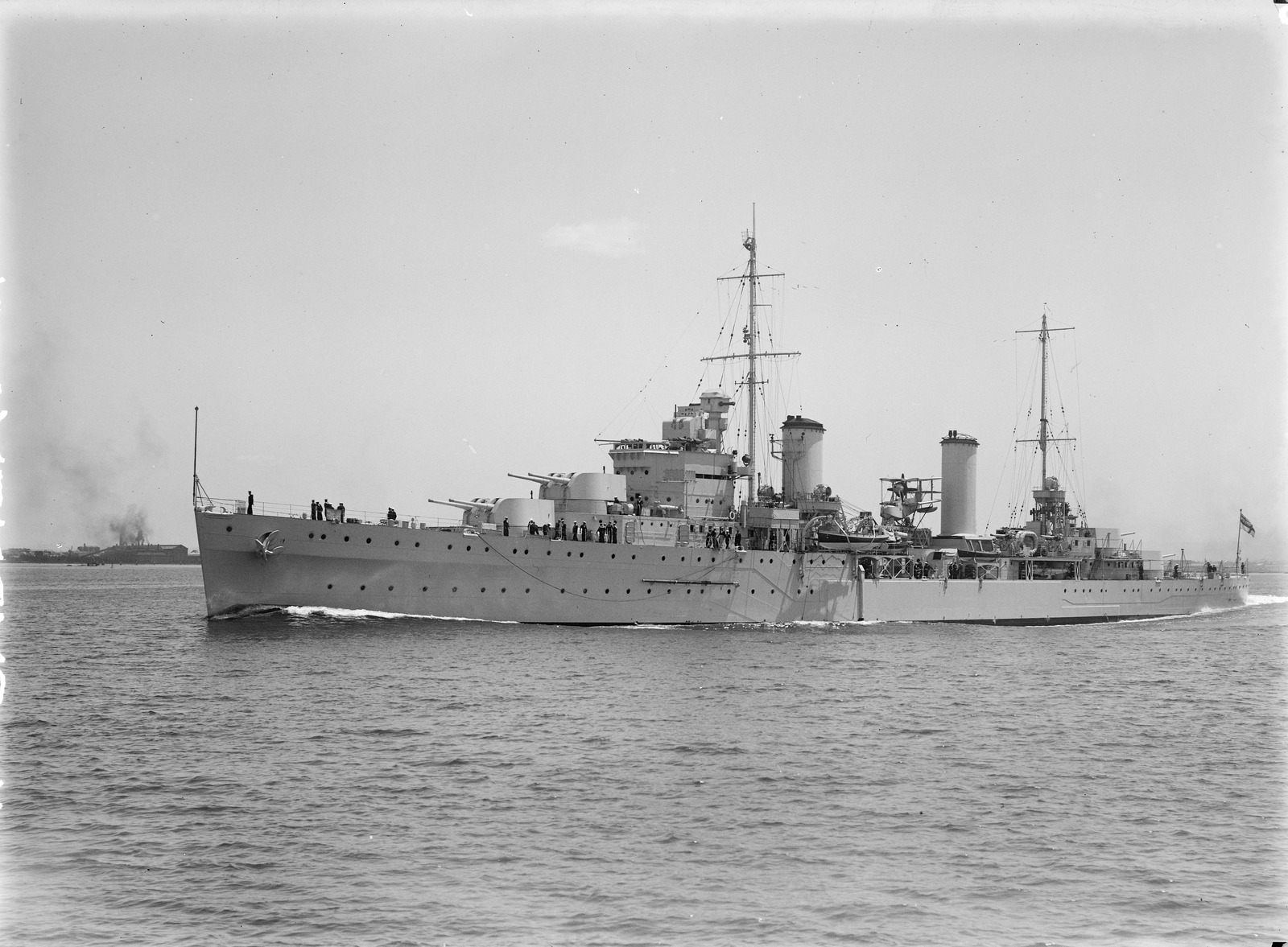
HMAS Sydney in 1936

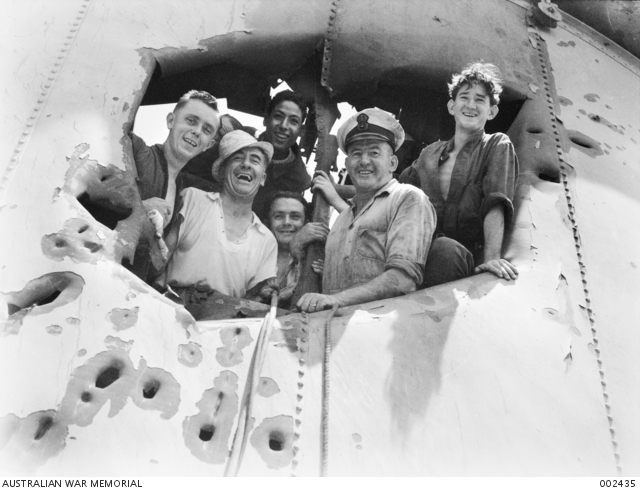
The hole in Sydney's forward funnel

== Aftermath ==
=== Casualties ===
Of the crew of Bartolomeo Colleoni there were 555 survivors but 121 men died; the captain, Umberto Novaro, was mortally wounded and died on 23 July. Capt. Novaro was decorated with the Gold Medal for Military Valor.

=== Subsequent operations ===
The British destroyers were bombed by Italian aircraft after the battle, damaging Havock, whose no. 2 boiler was flooded. A floatplane from Warspite, that was searching for Bande Nere, ditched in the sea and was lost near Tobruk, the crew being taken prisoner by the Italians. The British Convoy AN 2 was ordered to sail back to Port Said and remain there until Bande Nere reached Benghazi.

== Orders of battle ==
=== Regia Marina ===
2ª Divisione Incrociatori (2nd Cruiser Division)
Ship	Flag	Type	Notes
2nd Cruiser Division, Rear-Admiral Ferdinando Casardi
Bartolomeo Colleoni	Kingdom of Italy	Giussano-class cruiser	Sunk
Giovanni dalle Bande Nere	Kingdom of Italy	Giussano-class cruiser	

=== Royal Navy ===
British ships
Ship	Flag	Type	Notes
Support Force, Captain John Collins
HMAS Sydney	Royal Navy	Leander-class cruiser	Flag
HMS Havock	Royal Navy	H-class destroyer	
2nd Destroyer Flotilla, Captain H. Nicholson
HMS Hasty	Royal Navy	H-class destroyer	
HMS Hero	Royal Navy	H-class destroyer	
HMS Hyperion	Royal Navy	H-class destroyer	
HMS Ilex	Royal Navy	I-class destroyer	Flag

== Bibliography ==
- Coulthard-Clark, Chris (2001). The Encyclopaedia of Australia's Battles. Sydney: Allen & Unwin. ISBN 1-86508-634-7.
- Greene, J.; Massignani, A. (2002) [1998]. The Naval War in the Mediterranean 1940–1943 (pbk. ed.). Rochester: Chatham. ISBN 978-1-86176-190-3.
- O'Hara, Vincent P. (2009). Struggle for the Middle Sea: The Great Navies at War in the Mediterranean Theater, 1940–1945. Annapolis, MD: Naval Institute Press. ISBN 978-1-59114-648-3.
- Rohwer, Jürgen; Hümmelchen, Gerhard (2005) [1972]. Chronology of the War at Sea, 1939–1945: The Naval History of World War Two (3rd rev. ed.). London: Chatham. ISBN 1-86176-257-7.
- Titterton, G. A. (2002). The Royal Navy and the Mediterranean. Vol. II. London: Routledge. ISBN 0-7146-5179-6.
