= Second Battle of Sirte =

1942 naval battle between British and Italian forces

- Part of the Battle of the Mediterranean of Second World War
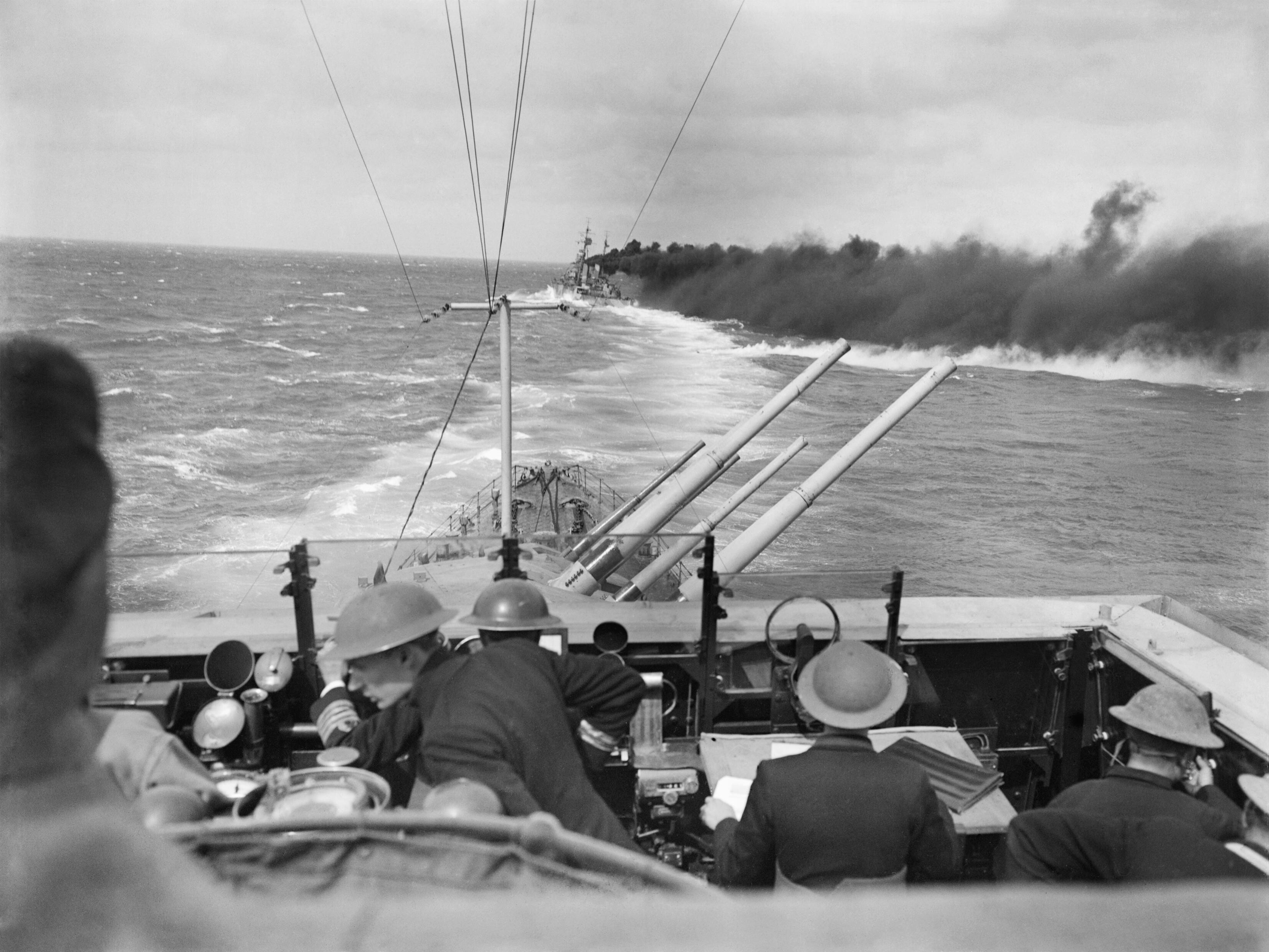
- British cruisers Cleopatra (making smoke) and Euryalus (foreground) moving into action
| Date | 22 March 1942 |
| Location | Gulf of Sidra, Mediterranean Sea 34.0°N 17.5°E |
| Result | See Analysis |

Belligerents
| British Empire | Italy |

Commanders and leaders
| Philip Vian | Angelo Iachino |

Strength
| 4 light cruisers; 1 anti-aircraft cruiser; 18 destroyers; 1 submarine | 1 battleship; 2 heavy cruisers; 1 light cruiser; 10 destroyers; 1 submarine |

Casualties and losses
| 39 killed; 3 light cruisers damaged; 2 destroyers disabled; 3 destroyers damaged | No casualties; 1 battleship slightly damaged |

The Second Battle of Sirte (on 22 March 1942) was a naval engagement in the Mediterranean Sea, north of the Gulf of Sidra and south-east of Malta, during the Second World War. The escorting warships of a British convoy to Malta held off a much more powerful squadron of the Regia Marina (Italian Navy). The British convoy was composed of four merchant ships, escorted by four light cruisers, one anti-aircraft cruiser and 17 destroyers. The Italian force comprised a battleship, two heavy cruisers, one light cruiser and ten destroyers.

== Background ==
=== Malta ===
Up to the end of 1941, 21 ships with 160,000 long tons (160,000 t) of cargo had reached Malta without loss and a reserve of seven months' supplies had been accumulated. Three convoys to Malta in 1941 suffered the loss of only one merchant ship. From January 1941 to August 1942, 46 ships had delivered 320,000 long tons (330,000 t) but 25 ships had been sunk and modern, efficient merchant ships, naval and air forces had been diverted from other routes for long periods; 31 supply runs by submarines had been conducted. Reinforcements for Malta included 19 costly and dangerous aircraft carrier ferry operations to deliver fighters. Malta was also a base for air, sea and submarine operations against Axis supply convoys and from 1 June to 31 October 1941, British forces sank about 220,000 long tons (220,000 t) of Axis shipping on the African convoy routes, 94,000 long tons (96,000 t) by the navy and 115,000 long tons (117,000 t) by the Royal Air Force (RAF) and Fleet Air Arm (FAA). Loaded ships sailing to Africa accounted for 90 per cent of the ships sunk and Malta-based squadrons were responsible for about 75 per cent of the ships sunk by aircraft. Military operations from Malta and using the island as a staging post, led to Axis air campaigns against the island in 1941 and 1942..

General map of Malta

By early 1942 the Allies had lost the initiative in the central Mediterranean as Italian and German forces isolated Malta and made plans to remove it as a threat. After a series of Allied defeats, the Italian Navy achieved naval superiority in the central Mediterranean by spring 1942. As Malta was running short of aircraft, anti-aircraft guns, fuel, food and ammunition, convoy MW10 sailed from Alexandria on 21 March. The British expected opposition from German and Italian aircraft as well as Italian surface units. In December 1941, the two battleships (Queen Elizabeth and Valiant) stationed in the eastern Mediterranean had been disabled by an attack by Italian frogmen, leaving the fleet with only cruisers and destroyers. A diversion was organised from Gibraltar, on the morning of 20 March, the battleship Malaya—with the aircraft carriers Eagle and Argus, supported by the cruiser Hermione and eight destroyers—sailed. The next day, the squadron aborted the operation and returned to port—the carriers were unable to launch aircraft reinforcements to Malta due to defective long-range fuel tanks. The escort of convoy MW10 relied on destroyers—including lighter-built destroyer escorts—to provide anti-submarine protection and included the anti-aircraft cruiser Carlisle. More destroyers and another light cruiser were sent from Malta.

== British plan ==
Admiral Sir Philip Vian, commanding the convoy, organised his ships into six divisions plus a close escort of five Hunt-class destroyers for the convoy

- 1st Division: destroyers HMS Jervis, Kipling, Kelvin and Kingston
- 2nd Division: light cruisers HMS Dido and Penelope with the destroyer Legion
- 3rd Division: destroyers HMS Zulu and Hasty
- 4th Division: light cruisers HMS Cleopatra (flagship) and Euryalus
- 5th Division: destroyers HMS Sikh, Lively, Hero and Havock
- 6th Division: anti-aircraft cruiser HMS Carlisle and Hunt-class destroyer Avon Vale

In case of an Italian surface attack, the first five divisions were to stand off from the convoy to face the enemy while the sixth division laid smoke across the wake of the convoy to obscure it. The first five divisions would act as a rearguard to lay smoke and delay the Regia Marina while Carlisle and the Hunt-class destroyers proceeded with the cargo ships to Malta.

== Battle ==
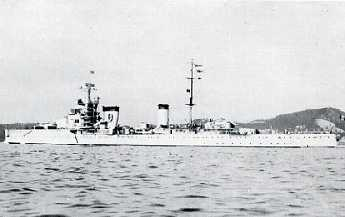
The Italian light cruiser Giovanni delle Bande Nere. During the battle, she landed a 6.0 in (152 mm) round on the bridge of the cruiser HMS Cleopatra with her second salvo, disabling the radar and radio.

At 14:30 the next day, the British were faced by a pair of heavy cruisers and escorting destroyers. Admiral Vian immediately implemented his plan; the cargo ships and escorts turned away to the south while the light cruisers and remaining destroyers laid smoke and charged the Italians. After an exchange of fire, the two Italian heavy cruisers backed off in an attempt to lure the British toward the incoming main Italian squadron, and at 16:37 they returned to attack with the battleship Littorio, a light cruiser and their screening destroyers. The battle raged for two and a half hours, with the British ships leaving the safety of their huge smoke screen to fire a few volleys and then returning to it when the Italian salvos got too close.

During one of these exchanges, Havock suffered severe damage from a near-miss when fired at by the Italian battleship Littorio, and was ordered to withdraw from the battle line and join the convoy. At 18:34, Vian decided to send his destroyers in to launch torpedo attacks from about 5,000 yd (4,600 m), the closest the Italians would allow the British to approach. None of the torpedoes found their targets but as Kingston turned she was hit by a round that penetrated her boiler room and ignited a fire, temporarily bringing her to a halt. The battle began with a 25 kn (29 mph; 46 km/h) wind blowing to the north-west, with the wind continuing to increase during the day, which favoured the gunnery of the larger Italian ships throughout the battle but aided the laying of smokescreens by Vian's ships.

Lively was struck by shell splinters from the battleship's main guns that pierced a bulkhead, causing some flooding but no casualties. At 18:55, Littorio had been hit by a 4.7 in (120 mm) shell, with negligible damage. Her floatplane caught fire from the blast from a salvo of her after turret at the same time; this led to the claim by the British that one of the torpedoes had struck. At dusk, before 19:00, the Italians gave up and turned for home; without radar they would have been at a significant disadvantage in a night action, as in the Battle of Cape Matapan. The Italians outgunned their British counterparts but appeared unwilling to close for a decisive blow, perhaps wary of the torpedo threat from the many British destroyers.

== Aftermath ==
=== Analysis ===
The Italian cruiser Gorizia firing her 203 mm (8-inch) guns at the British destroyers during the battle

Almost all historians have acknowledged the battle as a British victory, credited to the weak escort of light cruisers and destroyers which prevented the Italians from damaging the convoy, by repulsing an Italian squadron composed of a battleship and two heavy cruisers during massed Axis air attacks.

Whilst acknowledging the British success, some authors write of the battle as a partial Italian success in delaying and turning the convoy aside. Nearly all sources agree that the Italian fleet inflicted significant damage and several casualties on the British squadron while suffering minimal damage and no casualties in return.

In the following days, Axis aircraft caught the convoy at sea and chased the surviving steamers to the harbour; more than 80 per cent of the supplies were lost, making the British convoy operation a strategic failure.

=== Orders of battle ===
==== Regia Marina ====
- 1st division Admiral Angelo Iachino
- battleship
  - Littorio
- destroyers
  - Alfredo Oriani
  - Ascari
  - Aviere
  - Geniere
  - Grecale
  - Scirocco (sunk by a storm after the action)
- 2nd division, Admiral Angelo Parona
- heavy cruisers
  - Gorizia
  - Trento
- light cruiser
  - Giovanni delle Bande Nere
- destroyers
  - Alpino
  - Bersagliere
  - Fuciliere
  - Lanciere (sunk by a storm after the action)
- Submarine
  - Platino

==== Merchant Navy ====
- Merchant ships
  - Clan Campbell (sunk)
  - Breconshire (sunk)
  - Pampas (sunk)
  - Talabot (sunk)

==== Royal Navy ====
- Carlisle squadron
- C-class light cruiser
  - HMS Carlisle
- 5th Destroyer Flotilla (Hunt-class destroyer escorts) from Tobruk
  - HMS Southwold (sunk by a mine on 23 March)
  - HMS Beaufort
  - HMS Dulverton
  - HMS Hurworth
  - HMS Avon Vale
  - HMS Eridge
  - HMS Heythrop (lost en route to submarine U-652 20 March)
- 15th Cruiser Squadron (Admiral Vian)
- Dido-class light cruisers
  - HMS Dido
  - HMS Euryalus (slightly damaged)
  - HMS Cleopatra (seriously damaged)
- 14th Destroyer Flotilla
  - HMS Jervis
  - HMS Kipling
  - HMS Kelvin
  - HMS Kingston (severely damaged)
- 22nd Destroyer Flotilla
  - HMS Hasty
  - HMS Havock (severely damaged)
  - HMS Hero
  - HMS Lively (seriously damaged)
  - HMS Sikh (slightly damaged)
  - HMS Zulu (structural damage due to high speed manoeuvring)
- Force K (Malta squadron)
- Arethusa-class light cruiser
  - HMS Penelope
- Destroyer
  - HMS Legion (damaged by near miss during air attack on 23 March, sunk by air attack on 26 March while awaiting repair)
- Submarines
  - HMS Unbeaten
  - HMS Upholder
  - HMS Ultimatum
- Alexandria
- Submarine
  - Parthian-class submarine HMS Proteus

=== Battle damage ===
According to British reports, "HMS Cleopatra was struck on the after part of the bridge at 16:44" by a 152 mm (6.0 in) hit from the light cruiser Giovanni delle Bande Nere; 16 seamen were killed. According to Admiral Iachino, the hit was instead achieved by Littorio's secondary guns, based on the range between the opposite warships at the time. Cruisers Euryalus and Penelope were also damaged, with Euryalus straddled by Littorio at 16:43 and at 18:41. Kingston was hit amidships by a shell from Littorio that killed 15 men of her crew. and left the destroyer dead in the water, with her starboard whaleboat torn apart, her anti-aircraft guns, searchlight tower and torpedo launchers shattered by the explosion. Some sources claim that she was hit by the guns of the heavy cruiser Gorizia.

Although Kingston had an engine in flames and a flooded boiler, she managed to get back up to speed, reaching Malta the next day. Havock was also badly damaged in a boiler by a near miss from Littorio at 17:20; eight sailors died. Lively was forced to retreat to Tobruk for repairs at 18:55, after a near miss' splinter from Littorio's aft turret holed her hull, resulting in some flooding. Three more destroyers—Sikh, Legion and Lance—suffered lesser damage from 8 in (203 mm) cruiser fire. The Italian fleet expended 1,511 rounds of all calibres upon the British squadron; the only Italian destroyer to open fire was Aviere. The British cruisers had replied with 1,553 rounds and the destroyers with about 1,300 rounds as well as 38 torpedoes. Axis aircraft made continual attacks, mainly against the convoy, throughout the naval action and Royal Navy AA gunners claimed the destruction of seven Axis aircraft and damage to several more.

=== Subsequent operations ===
Destroyer HMS Kingston suffered severe damage from Littorio's main guns during the battle, and while in dry dock at Malta was hit by German bombers which damaged it beyond repair.

Most of the escort force, short of fuel and ammunition and unable to find the convoy, turned back for Alexandria. The damaged destroyers and the cargo ships were sent on to Malta, with Carlisle, Penelope and Legion. The next day, they were subjected to continuous air attacks. The cargo ship Clan Campbell was sunk 20 nmi (23 mi; 37 km) from harbour and the oil tanker Breconshire was too damaged to reach Valletta.

The merchantmen, Talabot and steamer Pampas, reached Grand Harbour virtually unharmed. Pampas had been hit by two bombs but these failed to explode. Penelope attempted to tow Breconshire, but the tow parted in heavy seas. She anchored short of the protective minefields and the destroyer Southwold attempted to take her in tow, hitting a mine in the process. She was eventually towed into Marsaxlokk Bay by tugs.

Axis air raids against Malta on 24 and 25 March failed to damage the three surviving convoy ships. On 26 March, German dive bombers hit all three ships, sinking Talabot and Pampas that day with Breconshire capsizing on 27 March. Much of Breconshire′s oil was salvaged through the hole in her hull. Only about 5,000 short tons (4,500 t) of cargo had been unloaded, of the 26,000 short tons (24,000 t) that had been loaded in Alexandria. The Italian fleet units were no luckier after the battle. After failing to destroy the convoy, they were caught en route to their bases by a severe storm that sank the destroyers Scirocco and Lanciere. While under repair in dry dock at Malta, Kingston was attacked a few days later by German aircraft and suffered further damage, this time beyond repair. She was scrapped in situ in the following months.

Whilst docked at Malta, Havock, was a target for Axis aircraft and sustained further damage. On 3 April the ship was ordered to Gibraltar before her repairs were complete. Havock ran aground off Kelibia, Tunisia, in the Strait of Sicily on 6 April and was wrecked, with one crewman killed in the incident. Another one died from wounds in the following days. On 8 April an Italian boarding party from the tug Instancabile (former Royal Yugoslav Navy Spasilac) searched the wreck looking for secret information. Havock's crew and passengers were interned by the Vichy French at Laghouat in the Sahara but were released in November as a result of Operation Torch.

== See also ==
- Malta convoys
- Margit Johnsen
- The Ship (1943) by C. S. Forester is a fictionalised account of the battle, seeing the action through the eyes of the crew of a Royal Navy light cruiser "HMS Artemis" (it is dedicated to "the officers and ship's company of H.M.S. Penelope"). It depicts the Italians as inept and cowardly, even though deploying a superior force of two battleships, three heavy and four light cruisers; but it seems fairly accurate on the action (while overstating the accuracy of British fire) and gives an excellent account of the roles of different crew members. Published in 1943, the novel did have a propaganda/morale-raising aspect, stressing that everyone's efforts were important, and not mentioning the loss of merchant ships afterwards. Forester, best known for his Hornblower R.N. novels, sailed with both the British and American navies during the Second World War to gather material.

== Sources ==
- Bauer, Eddy; James L. Collins, Jr; and Peter Young: The Marshall Cavendish Encyclopedia of World War Two. Marshall Cavendish, 1985. ISBN 978-0-85685-954-0.
- Bradford, Ernle: Siege: Malta 1940–1943, William Morrow and Company, Inc., New York, 1986. ISBN 978-0-688-04781-8.
- Bragadin, Marc'Antonio: The Italian Navy in World War II, United States Naval Institute, Annapolis, 1957. OCLC 602717421.
- Cunningham, Andrew: A Sailor's Life, New York, 1955.
- Greene, Jack & Massignani, Alessandro: The Naval War in the Mediterranean, 1940–1943, Chatham Publishing, London, 1998. ISBN 978-1-86176-057-9.
- Gigli, Guido: La Seconda Guerra Mondiale. Laterza, 1964. (in Italian)
- Guglielmotti, Umberto: Storia della marina italiana. V. Bianco, 1961 (in Italian)
- Harwood, Admiral Sir Henry H., Despatch on the Battle of Sirte 1942 Mar. 22., Supplement to the London Gazette, 18 September 1947.
- Holland, James: Fortress Malta: An Island Under Siege, 1940–1943, Miramax Books, New York, 2003. ISBN 978-1-4013-5186-1.
- Hough, Richard Alexander:The longest battle: the war at sea, 1939–45. Weidenfeld and Nicolson, 1986
- Jellison, Charles A.: Besieged: The World War II Ordeal of Malta, 1940–1942, University Press of New England, 1984. ISBN 978-0-87451-313-4.
- Llewellyn, M. J.: The Royal Navy and the Mediterranean Convoys: A Naval Staff History, Naval Staff History series, Routledge, London, 2007. ISBN 978-0-415-39095-8.
- Macintyre, Donald: The Battle for the Mediterranean. Norton ed., New York, 1965.
- O'Hara, Vincent P.: Struggle for the Middle Sea, Naval Institute Press, Annapolis, Maryland, 2009. ISBN 978-1-59114-648-3.
- Playfair, Major-General I. S. O.; et al. (2004) [1st. pub. HMSO: 1960]. Butler, Sir James (ed.). The Mediterranean and Middle East: British Fortunes Reach Their Lowest Ebb (September 1941 to September 1942). History of the Second World War, United Kingdom Military Series. Vol. III. Uckfield, UK: Naval & Military Press. ISBN 978-1-84574-067-2.
- Richards, D.; Saunders, H. St G. (1975) [1954]. Royal Air Force 1939–45: The Fight Avails. Vol. II (repr. ed.). London: HMSO. ISBN 978-0-11-771593-6.
- Roskill, S. W. (1957) [1954]. Butler, J. R. M. (ed.). The Defensive. History of the Second World War United Kingdom Military Series: The War at Sea 1939–1945. Vol. I (4th impr. ed.). London: HMSO. OCLC 881709135.
- Sadkovich, James: The Italian Navy in World War II, Greenwood Press, Westport, 1994. ISBN 978-0-313-28797-8.
- Secchia, Pietro: Enciclopedia dell'antifascismo e della Resistenza. La Pietra, 1989.
- Shores, Christopher and Brian Cull with Nicola Malizia: Malta: The Spitfire Year, 1942. Grub Street, London, 1991. ISBN 978-0-948817-16-8.
- Sierra, Luis de la: La guerra naval en el Mediterráneo, 1940–1943, Ed. Juventud, Barcelona, 1976. ISBN 978-84-261-0264-5. (in Spanish)
- Simpson, Michael: A life of Admiral of the Fleet Andrew Cunningham. A Twentieth-century Naval Leader. Routledge Ed., 2004. ISBN 978-0-7146-5197-2.
- Stephen, Martin; Grove, Erik: Sea Battles in Close-up: World War Two. Naval Institute press, 1988. ISBN 978-0-7110-2118-1.
- Thomas, David A.: Malta Convoys, Leo Cooper Ed., South Yorkshire, 1999. ISBN 978-0-85052-663-9.
- Wilmott, Ned & Fowler, Will: Strategy & tactics of sea warfare. Marshall Cavendish, 1979. ISBN 978-0-85685-505-4
- Woodman, Richard: Malta Convoys, 1940–1943, Jack Murray Ltd., London, 2000. ISBN 978-0-7195-5753-8.
