= Ferdinando Casardi =

Italian politician

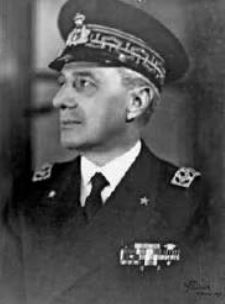
- Born: 1 January 1887; Barletta, Apulia, Italy
- Died: 11 January 1975 (aged 88); Barletta, Apulia, Italy
- Military career
- Allegiance: Kingdom of Italy
- Branch: Regia Marina
- Service years: 1904–1975
- Rank: Ammiraglio di Divisione (Vice Admiral)
- Commands: 69 PN (torpedo boat); Generale Antonio Chinotto (destroyer); Vincenzo Giordano Orsini (destroyer); Alvise Da Mosto (destroyer); Ugolino Vivaldi (destroyer); Giovanni delle Bande Nere (light cruiser); Zara (heavy cruiser); Libya Naval Command; 4th Naval Division; 2nd Naval Division; 7th Naval Division; Naples Naval Department
- Conflicts: Italo-Turkish War; World War I; World War II; Battle of Cape Spada
- Awards: Silver Medal of Military Valor Military Order of Savoy Order of the German Eagle

Ferdinando Casardi (1 January 1887 – 11 January 1975) was an Italian admiral during World War II.

== Early life and career ==
Born in Barletta in 1887, Casardi entered the Livorno Naval Academy in 1904, graduating as ensign in 1907. Between 1911 and 1912, as a midshipman, he first took part in a campaign in the Red Sea and Indian Ocean aboard the aviso Staffetta, and then fought in the Italo-Turkish War. During World War I he served as lieutenant on the battleships Vittorio Emanuele and Dante Alighieri.

After the end of the war, Casardi served for some years in command of torpedo boats; in 1920 he sailed up the Danube on the torpedo boat 69 PN. After promotion to lieutenant commander, he was appointed commanding officer of the destroyers Generale Antonio Chinotto and Vincenzo Giordano Orsini; he was subsequently promoted to commander, and given shore assignments in the Ministry of the Navy and the Arms and Naval Armaments Management Direction in La Spezia, then he became deputy chief of staff of the Special Naval Division and later commanding officer of the destroyers Alvise Da Mosto and Ugolino Vivaldi in 1931-1932. From 1932 to 1934, after promotion to captain, he was sent to Washington as naval attaché and then, back in Italy, he became honorary aide-de-camp to Victor Emmanuel III.

In 1935 Casardi became adjunct chief of staff of the 1st Naval Division, embarked on the heavy cruiser Pola, while in 1936 he briefly commanded the cruisers Giovanni delle Bande Nere and Zara. In 1937, after promotion to rear admiral, he was placed in command of Naval Command Libya, which he held until February 1940. During this period, in 1939, he was promoted to vice admiral; from February to May 1940 he commanded the 4th Naval Division. He was then placed in command of the 2nd Naval Division, formed by light cruisers Giovanni delle Bande Nere (flagship) and Bartolomeo Colleoni, and he still held this role when Italy entered World War II, on 10 June 1940.

== World War II and later years ==
After escorting to Libya the convoy that triggered the Battle of Calabria, Casardi became a protagonist, in July 1940, of the Battle of Cape Spada, in which Colleoni was sunk. Following the loss of Colleoni, the 2nd Naval Division was dissolved; in August 1940 Casardi was placed in command of the 7th Naval Division, with flag on the light cruiser Eugenio Savoia and later on Emanuele Filiberto Duca d'Aosta. For a year, as the commander of the 7th Division, Casardi participated in convoy escort, bombardment and minelaying missions; he was awarded the Silver Medal of Military Valor, the Knight's Cross of the Military Order of Savoy and Cross of the Order of the German Eagle, second class.

Since August 1941, having left the command of the Seventh Division, Casardi was for two years the staff and general services director of the Regia Marina. On 7 August 1943 he was appointed commander in chief of the Naples Naval Department. Following the armistice of 8 September 1943, clashes broke out in Naples between Italian and German soldiers, and in a few days the city was occupied by German forces. On September 11 Casardi, in order to avoid capture, sought refuge with his main collaborators in a building owned by his chief of staff, where he continued to work clandestinely until September 30, when German troops left Naples in the face of the insurrection of the population of the city and the Allied advance. He immediately returned to his headquarters, devastated by bombing and fighting, and reactivated it on the following day, immediately starting the cooperation with the commands of the Allied forces, which reached Naples from 1 October. He left the command of the Naples Naval Department in February 1945, and was then assigned to the General Secretariat of the Navy and later became president of the High Council of the Navy.

In 1948 he was elected in the Italian Senate in the first legislature of the Italian Republic (1948–1953), serving as Undersecretary for Finance in the De Gasperi VI Cabinet. He was placed in availability on 1 March 1949, and in the reserve on 1 January 1950, having reached the age limit. Casardi died in Barletta on 11 January 1975.
