= Giussano-class cruiser =

Italian light cruiser subclass (1931–1942)

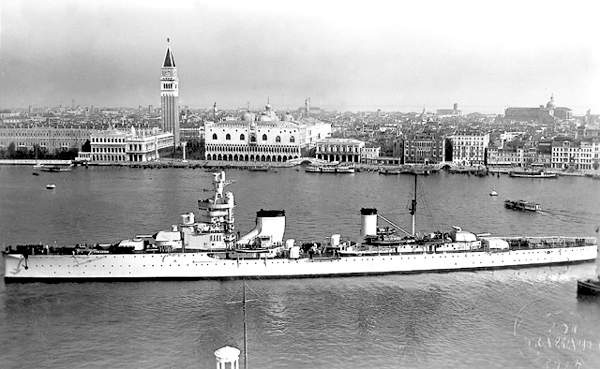
- Bartolomeo Colleoni in Venice

Class overview
- Name: Giussano class
- Operators: Regia Marina
- Built: 1928–1930
- In commission: 1931–1942
- Completed: 4
- Lost: 4

General characteristics
- Type: Cruiser
- Displacement: 6,570 tonnes (6,470 long tons) standard; 6,954 tonnes (6,844 long tons) full load
- Length: 169.3 m (555 ft)
- Beam: 15.5 m (51 ft)
- Draft: 5.3 m (17 ft)
- Propulsion: 95,000 hp (71,000 kW)
- Speed: 37 knots (69 km/h; 43 mph); (42 knots (78 km/h; 48 mph) in trials)
- Range: 3,800 nmi (7,000 km) at 18 kn (33 km/h; 21 mph)
- Complement: 507
- Armament: 8 × 152 mm (6 in) /53 guns in 4 twin mountings; 6 × 100 mm (4 in) / 47 caliber guns in 3 twin mountings; 8 × 37 mm (1.5 in) 54-cal. guns; 8 × 13.2 mm machine-guns; 4 × 533 mm (21 in) torpedo tubes
- Armor: Decks: 20 mm (0.79 in); Belt: 24 mm (0.94 in); Turrets: 23 mm (0.91 in); Tower: 40 mm (1.6 in)
- Aircraft carried: 2 × CANT 25AR (later Ro.43) seaplanes
- Aviation facilities: 1 × catapult launcher

The Alberto di Giussano class of light cruisers were a sub-class of the Condottieri class built before World War II for the Italian Regia Marina, to gain predominance in the Mediterranean Sea. They were designed by general Giuseppe Vian and were named after Condottieri (military commanders) of the Italian Mediaeval and Renaissance periods.

Between the World Wars, the world powers started a rush to gain the supremacy on the seas. In 1926, France started to produce the Le Fantasque class of destroyers, which were superior in displacement and firepower to other destroyers of that period. To counter the French menace, the Regia Marina decided to produce a new class of cruiser that would be of intermediate size between the new French destroyer class and cruisers. The Italian ships equated to the British Leander-class cruisers.

There were 4 ships, all laid down in 1928: Alberto di Giussano, Alberico da Barbiano, Bartolomeo Colleoni and Giovanni delle Bande Nere.

Meant to hunt down and overwhelm the big French destroyers, the emphasis on firepower and speed resulted in these ships being virtually unprotected against gunfire and underwater threats; this was a major factor in all four ships being sunk by torpedoes.

== Ships ==
Ships of the Alberto di Giussano class
Ship	Builder	Laid down	Launched	Completed	Fate
Alberico da Barbiano	Ansaldo, Genoa	16 April 1928	23 August 1930	9 June 1931	Sunk 13 December 1941, by a group of Royal Navy and Dutch destroyers during the Battle of Cape Bon.
Alberto di Giussano	Ansaldo, Genoa	29 March 1928	27 April 1930	5 February 1931	Sunk 13 December 1941, by a group of Royal Navy and Dutch destroyers during the Battle of Cape Bon.
Bartolomeo Colleoni	Ansaldo, Genoa	21 June 1928	21 December 1930	10 February 1932	Sunk 19 July 1940, during the Battle of Cape Spada.
Giovanni delle Bande Nere	R. C. di Castellammare di Stabia	31 October 1928	27 April 1930	27 April 1931	Sunk 1 April 1942, torpedoed by British submarine HMS Urge while off Stromboli.

== See also ==
- List of ship classes of the Second World War
