= HMS Latona (M76) =

Coordinates: 32°15′N 24°14′E

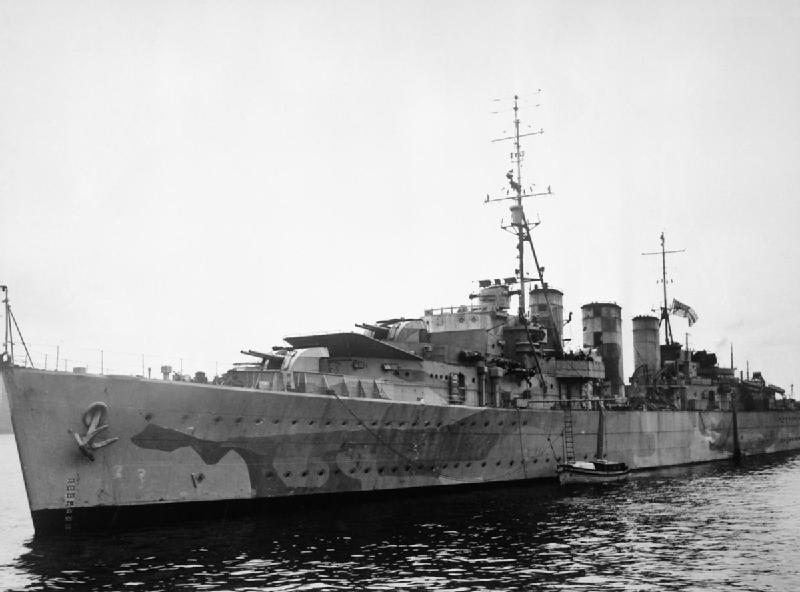

History

United Kingdom
- Name: HMS Latona
- Ordered: 23 December 1938
- Builder: John I. Thornycroft & Company, Woolston, Hampshire
- Laid down: 4 April 1939
- Launched: 20 August 1940
- Commissioned: 4 May 1941
- Identification: Pennant number M76
- Motto: Vestigia nostra cavate: 'Beware our tracks'
- Honours and awards: Libya 1941
- Fate: Sunk on 25 October 1941
- Badge: On a Field barry wavy White and Blue, upon a pomme vert a sun in splendour Gold eclipsed by a moon White.

General characteristics
- Class & type: Abdiel-class minelayer
- Displacement: 2,650 tons standard; 3,415 tons full
- Length: 418 ft (127 m)
- Beam: 40 ft (12 m)
- Draught: 16 ft (4.9 m)
- Propulsion: Two shafts; Geared turbines; four Admiralty 3-drum boilers; 72,000 shp
- Speed: 40 knots (74 km/h)
- Complement: 242
- Armament: 6 × QF 4-inch (100 mm) Mark XVI guns on twin mounts HA/LA Mk.XIX; 4 × QF 2-pounder (40 mm) Mk.VIII on quadruple mount Mk.VII; 8 × 0.5-inch (12.7 mm) Vickers machine guns on quadruple mount Mk.I (later up to 12 x Oerlikon 20 mm cannons on single mounts P Mk.III or twin mounts Mk.V); 156 mines

HMS Latona was an Abdiel-class minelayer of the Royal Navy. She served briefly during the Second World War, but was sunk less than six months after commissioning.

== Construction and commissioning ==
Latona was ordered on 23 December 1938 and was laid down at the yards of John I. Thornycroft & Company, of Woolston, Hampshire on 4 April 1939. She was launched on 20 August 1940 as a fast minelayer. She was commissioned on 4 May 1941 but never served in her intended primary role, instead being used in the Mediterranean to deliver stores and supplies to the allied armies and garrisons at Tobruk and Cyprus.

== Wartime career ==
On being commissioned Latona sailed to Scapa Flow to embark stores and extra Oerlikon 20 mm cannons for defence against air attacks. Having completed loading, she sailed for the Mediterranean on 16 May, travelling via the Cape of Good Hope and the Red Sea. She arrived at Alexandria on 21 June, joining her sister Abdiel. The following day they sailed to support military operations in the eastern Mediterranean. Latona’s first assignment was to carry RAF personnel to Cyprus to reinforce the garrison there. After successfully carrying this out, she returned to Alexandria on 25 July.

She sailed again in August in company with Abdiel, the Australian cruiser Hobart, and Australian destroyers Napier and Nizam to support the garrison at Tobruk. They eventually carried some 6,300 troops to Tobruk and evacuated another 6,100. On 25 October the ships supporting Tobruk came under air attack north of Bardia. Latona, carrying 1,000 Polish troops, was hit in the engine room by a bomb from a Junkers Ju 87 of I./StG1. This started a fire which soon raged out of control. The destroyers Hero and Encounter came alongside to assist and evacuated most of the troops and crew. Latona remained afloat for a further two hours, before the after magazine exploded, sinking the ship. Four officers, 16 crew members and 7 soldiers were killed.

== Bibliography ==
- Nicholson, Arthur (2015). Very Special Ships: Abdiel-Class Fast Minelayers of World War Two. Barnsley, UK: Seaforth Publishing. ISBN 978-1-84832-235-6.
