= HMS Havock (H43) =

H-class destroyer of the Royal Navy

Coordinates: 36°52′18″N 11°8′24″E

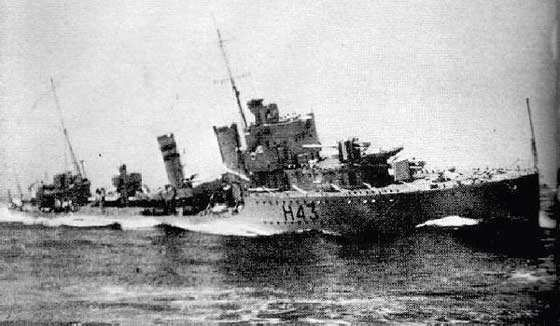
- Havock underway shortly before the start of WW2

History

United Kingdom
- Name: Havock
- Builder: William Denny & Brothers, Dumbarton
- Laid down: 15 May 1935
- Launched: July 1936
- Completed: 16 January 1937
- Identification: Pennant number: H43
- Fate: Ran aground and wrecked, 6 April 1942

General characteristics as built
- Class & type: H-class destroyer
- Displacement: 1,350 long tons (1,370 t) (standard); 1,883 long tons (1,913 t) (deep load)
- Length: 323 ft (98.5 m)
- Beam: 33 ft (10.1 m)
- Draught: 12 ft 5 in (3.8 m)
- Installed power: 34,000 shp (25,000 kW); 3 Admiralty 3-drum boilers
- Propulsion: 2 shafts, 2 geared steam turbines
- Speed: 36 knots (67 km/h; 41 mph)
- Range: 5,530 nmi (10,240 km; 6,360 mi) at 15 knots (28 km/h; 17 mph)
- Complement: 137 (peacetime), 146 (wartime)
- Sensors & processing systems: ASDIC
- Armament: 4 × single 4.7 in (120 mm) guns; 2 × quadruple 0.5 in (12.7 mm) AA machineguns; 2 × quadruple 21 in (533 mm) torpedo tubes; 20 × depth charges, 1 rail and 2 throwers

HMS Havock was an H-class destroyer built for the British Royal Navy in the mid-1930s. During the Spanish Civil War of 1936–1939, the ship enforced the arms blockade imposed by Britain and France on both sides as part of the Mediterranean Fleet. During the first few months of the Second World War, Havock searched for German commerce raiders in the Atlantic Ocean and participated in the First Battle of Narvik during the Norwegian Campaign of April–June 1940 before she was transferred back to the Mediterranean Fleet in May where she escorted a number of convoys to Malta. The ship took part in the Battle of Cape Spada in July 1940, the Battle of Cape Matapan in March 1941 and the evacuation of Greece in April 1941. She was damaged during the Battle of Crete the following month, but participated in the Syria–Lebanon Campaign in June.

Havock began escorting supply convoys in June to Tobruk, Libya until the ship was damaged in October. She was repaired in time to escort a convoy to Malta during the First Battle of Sirte in December and was badly damaged by the Italian battleship Littorio whilst protecting another convoy during the Second Battle of Sirte in March 1942. Repairs were attempted in Malta, but the ship was further damaged in an air raid in early April. The Admiralty decided that further attempts to repair her at Malta were pointless and ordered her to Gibraltar for permanent repairs. On 6 April, while on passage to Gibraltar, Havock ran aground near Cape Bon, Tunisia, and her crew was interned by the Vichy French at Laghouat in the Sahara.

== Description ==
Havock displaced 1,350 long tons (1,370 t) at standard load and 1,883 long tons (1,913 t) at deep load. The ship had an overall length of 323 feet (98.5 m), a beam of 33 feet (10.1 m) and a draught of 12 feet 5 inches (3.8 m). She was powered by Parsons geared steam turbines, driving two shafts, which developed a total of 34,000 shaft horsepower (25,000 kW) and gave a maximum speed of 36 knots (67 km/h; 41 mph). Steam for the turbines was provided by three Admiralty 3-drum boilers. Havock carried a maximum of 470 long tons (480 t) of fuel oil that gave her a range of 5,530 nautical miles (10,240 km; 6,360 mi) at 15 knots (28 km/h; 17 mph). The ship's complement was 137 officers and ratings in peacetime, but this increased to 146 in wartime.

The ship mounted four 45-calibre 4.7-inch Mk IX guns in single mounts, designated 'A', 'B', 'X', and 'Y' from front to rear. For anti-aircraft (AA) defence, Havock had two quadruple Mark I mounts for the Vickers 0.5 in (12.7 mm) AA machineguns. She was fitted with two above-water quadruple torpedo tube mounts for 21-inch torpedoes. One depth charge rail and two throwers were fitted; 20 depth charges were originally carried, but this increased to 35 shortly after the war began. By mid-1940, this had increased to 44 depth charges.

=== Wartime modifications ===
Most ships of Havock's class had the rear torpedo tubes replaced by a 12-pounder AA gun after the evacuation of Dunkirk in 1940, but it is not clear if she received this modification. Other changes may have included exchanging her two quadruple 0.50-calibre Vickers machine gun mounts between her funnels for two 20-millimeter (0.8 in) Oerlikon AA guns, the addition of two Oerlikon guns to her searchlight platform and another pair on the wings of the bridge.

== Construction and career ==
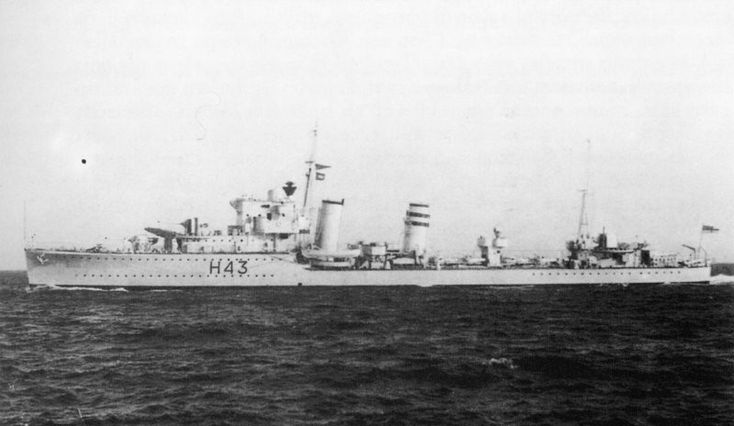
Havock underway

Ordered on 13 December 1934 from William Denny & Brothers, Havock was laid down at their shipyard at Dumbarton, Scotland on 15 May 1935. She was launched on 7 July 1936 and completed on 16 January 1937. Excluding government-furnished equipment like the armament, the ship cost £248,470.

Havock was assigned to the 2nd Destroyer Flotilla of the Mediterranean Fleet upon commissioning. She patrolled Spanish waters during the Spanish Civil War enforcing the policies of the Non-Intervention Committee. On the night of 31 August/1 September 1937, she was unsuccessfully attacked by the Italian submarine Iride with torpedoes, between the Gulf of Valencia and the Balearic Islands. The ship was refitted in Gibraltar between 19 October and 13 November and required repairs between 16 April and 6 May 1938 after hitting the stone side of a quay. Havock was given a brief refit at Sheerness Dockyard between 15 and 26 August 1939 before returning to Gibraltar.

=== World War II ===
The ship sailed to Freetown, Sierra Leone on 30 August and arrived on 4 September to search for German commerce raiders. She was transferred back to the UK in November for a more thorough refit at Sheerness between 18 December and 23 March 1940. In the meantime, the 2nd Destroyer Flotilla had been assigned to the Home Fleet and Havock rejoined them when her refit was finished. On 6 April Havock and the rest of the 2nd Destroyer Flotilla escorted the four destroyer minelayers of the 20th Destroyer Flotilla as they sailed to implement Operation Wilfred, an operation to lay mines in the Vestfjord to prevent the transport of Swedish iron ore from Narvik to Germany. The mines were laid on the early morning of 8 April, before the Germans began their invasion, and the destroyers joined the battlecruiser Renown and her escorts.

=== Battle of Narvik ===
Main Article: Battle of Narvik

During the First Battle of Narvik on 10 April 1940, Havock and four other H-class ships of the 2nd Destroyer Flotilla attacked the German destroyers that had transported German troops to occupy Narvik in northern Norway the previous day. The flotilla leader Hardy led four of her half-sisters down Ofotfjord in a surprise dawn attack on Narvik harbour during a blinding snowstorm. Hotspur and Hostile were initially left at the entrance, but Havock was third into the harbour and fired five of her torpedoes into the mass of shipping. One torpedo hit the crippled German destroyer Anton Schmitt (Z22) in the stern, which had already taken a torpedo hit from the destroyer HMS Hunter which left her dead in the water. Havock's torpedo delivered the finishing blow as Anton Schmitt broke in half and sank with the loss of 50 sailors. Afterwards, Havock entered a gunnery duel with the German destroyer Hans Luudman (Z18). Havock was straddled multiple times but not hit, and in turn hit Hans Luudman with two 4.7-inch (120 mm) shells, disabling one of her forward guns and rudder control and starting a large fire, forcing Luudman to retreat.

As the British ships were withdrawing, they encountered five German destroyers at close range. Three of the German destroyers, Wolfgang Zenker, Erich Giese, and Erich Koellner, crossed the T of the British ships and quickly combined gunfire. They set Hardy on fire, destroyed her guns and boilers, and caused the ship to run aground where she later capsized, before blasting Hunter with a hail of 5-inch (127 mm) shells and possibly 1 torpedo hit, sinking her with the loss of 106 sailors. Havock was next in line and fired torpedoes at the German destroyers, but they all missed. She was hit in return, but not significantly damaged. In the confusion and limited visibility, Havock pulled out of the line to find out what happened to Hardy and to protect the rear of the British formation from the other three German destroyers in pursuit, but then had to then to turn again to allow her rear guns to fire when her forward guns failed. Havock and Hostile turned back to protect their badly damaged sister, Hotspur, and all three continued to withdraw down the Ofotfjord. En route, they encountered the German supply ship Rauenfels, loaded with artillery and ammunition. Havock and Hostile fired on the ship and hit Rauenfels multiple time, whose crew ran her aground and abandoned ship. A boarding party from Havock found the ship on fire and she blew up after the ship fired two shells into her. The ship remained in Norwegian waters until May, when she escorted the light cruiser Birmingham on an unsuccessful sweep of the North Sea looking for German ships, early in the month.

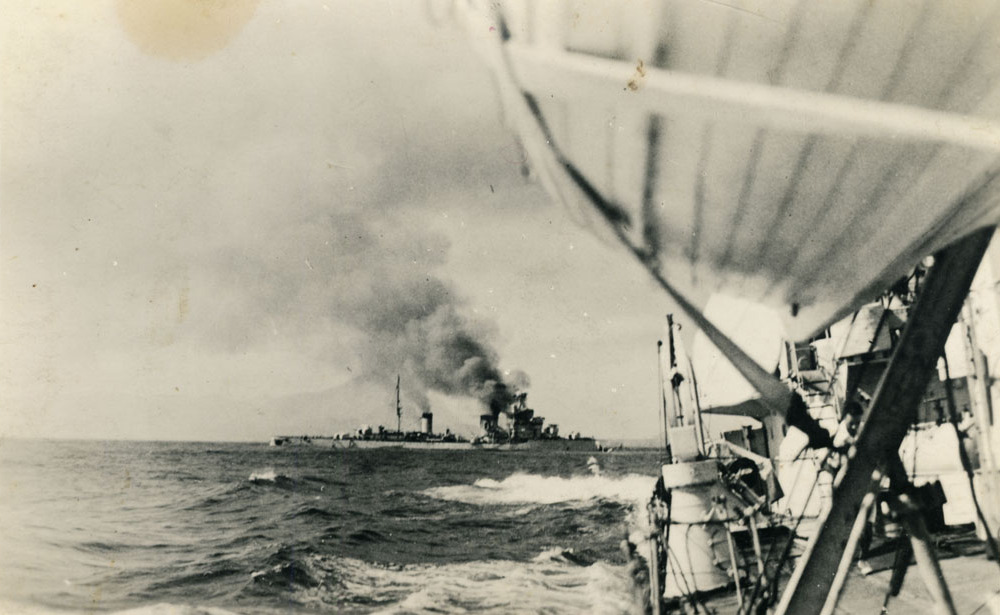
Bartolomeo Colleoni seen from Havock

Havock was assigned to the Nore Command shortly afterwards and bombarded German troops occupying Waalhaven Airfield on 10 May together with her sister Hyperion. She rescued survivors from the sunken ferry Prinses Juliana off the Dutch coast and returned them to the Hook of Holland where she recovered a number of British demolition parties. On 16 May, the ship was ordered to reinforce the Mediterranean Fleet at Malta and was assigned to the 2nd Destroyer Flotilla. During the Battle of Cape Spada on 19 July, the ship escorted the Australian light cruiser HMAS Sydney and rescued some of the 525 survivors from the Italian cruiser Bartolomeo Colleoni together with the other escorting destroyers. Her boiler room was flooded after an attack by Italian aircraft after this battle and she was repaired at Suez from 29 July to 15 September. Havock and her sister Hasty surprised the Italian submarine Berillo on the surface on 2 October off the coast of Egypt and forced her to scuttle herself. The destroyers rescued 47 survivors between them.

Havock was engaged on escort duties for the next six months, including escorting the carrier Illustrious during the Battle of Taranto on the night of 11/12 November, aside from a refit in Malta from 22 December to 20 February 1941. During the Battle of Cape Matapan, she torpedoed and sank the Italian destroyer Vittorio Alfieri on 28 March.

The ship evacuated Commonwealth troops from Greece at the end of April and was one of three destroyers escorting the light cruiser Ajax when they bombarded Benghazi on the night of 7/8 May. Havock was damaged by dive bombers on 23 May, killing 15 and wounding 10 men, after a patrol off Heraklion, Crete. She was under repair at Alexandria until 16 June. The ship bombarded Vichy French positions in Lebanon in early July and then began escorting ships to Tobruk until October when her propeller shafts and propellers were damaged. Havock was under repair from 21 October to 4 December at Alexandria.

In mid-December, the ship escorted the supply ship Breconshire to Malta during the brief engagement known as First Battle of Sirte and then joined Force K in an attempt to intercept an Italian convoy to Tripoli, Libya. On the night of 18/19 December, the reinforced Force K ran over an Italian minefield that sank one cruiser and damaged two others. Havock escorted the badly damaged light cruiser Aurora back to Malta. Havock was one of four destroyers that escorted Breconshire back to Alexandria in early January 1942. Whilst escorting another convoy to Malta, the ship was diverted to escort the damaged freighter Thermoplylae from Benghazi back to Alexandria but the latter was attacked and sunk en route by Axis aircraft on 19 January. Havock rescued some 350 survivors before Thermoplylae sank.

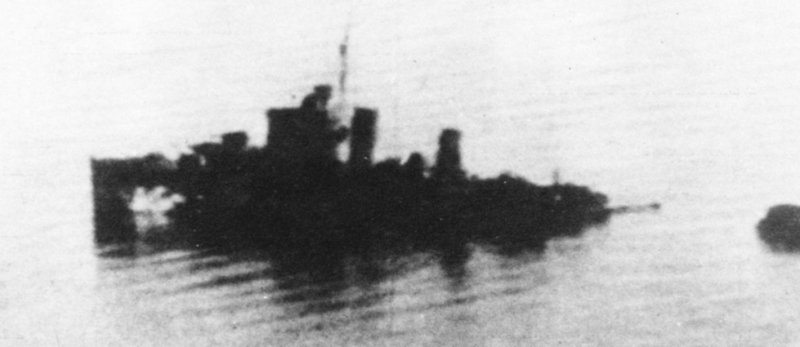
Havock run aground in the strait of Sicily, 9 April 1942

The ship was transferred to the 22nd Destroyer Flotilla in February and continued to escort convoys to Malta. On 22 March 1942, several splinters from a 15-inch (38 cm) near miss from the Italian battleship Littorio perforated one of her boilers during the Second Battle of Sirte, killing eight men. Havock was forced to make for Malta for repairs. Whilst in dock, the ship was a target for Axis aircraft and sustained some damage on 3 April and was ordered to Gibraltar before her repairs were complete. Havock ran aground off Kelibia, Tunisia, in the Strait of Sicily on 6 April and was wrecked, with one crewman killed in the incident. Her crew and passengers were interned by the Vichy French at Laghouat in the Sahara but were released in November as a result of Operation Torch. Her wreck was later torpedoed by the Italian submarine Aradam.

== Sources ==
- English, John (1993). Amazon to Ivanhoe: British Standard Destroyers of the 1930s. Kendal, UK: World Ship Society. ISBN 0-905617-64-9.
- Friedman, Norman (2009). British Destroyers From Earliest Days to the Second World War. Annapolis, Maryland: Naval Institute Press. ISBN 978-1-59114-081-8.
- Haarr, Geirr H. (2009). The German Invasion of Norway, April 1940. Annapolis, Maryland: Naval Institute Press. ISBN 978-1-59114-310-9.
- Lenton, H. T. (1998). British & Empire Warships of the Second World War. Annapolis, Maryland: Naval Institute Press. ISBN 1-55750-048-7.
- O'Hara, Vincent P. (2009). Struggle for the Middle Sea: The Great Navies at War in the Mediterranean Theater, 1940–1945. Annapolis, Maryland: Naval Institute Press. ISBN 978-1-59114-648-3.
- Rohwer, Jürgen (2005). Chronology of the War at Sea 1939–1945: The Naval History of World War Two (Third Revised ed.). Annapolis, Maryland: Naval Institute Press. ISBN 1-59114-119-2.
- Shores, Christopher; Cull, Brian & Malizia, Nicola (1987). Air War for Yugoslavia, Greece, and Crete. London: Grub Street. ISBN 0-948817-07-0.
- The Royal Navy and the Mediterranean: November 1940 – December 1941. Whitehall Histories, Naval Staff Histories. Vol. II (Whitehall History in association with Frank Cass ed.). London: United Kingdom, Admiralty Historical Section. 2002. ISBN 0-7146-5205-9.
- Whitley, M. J. (1988). Destroyers of World War Two: An International Encyclopedia. Annapolis, Maryland: Naval Institute Press. ISBN 0-87021-326-1.
