= HMS Hasty (H24) =

H-class destroyer of the Royal Navy

Coordinates: 34°10′N 22°0′E

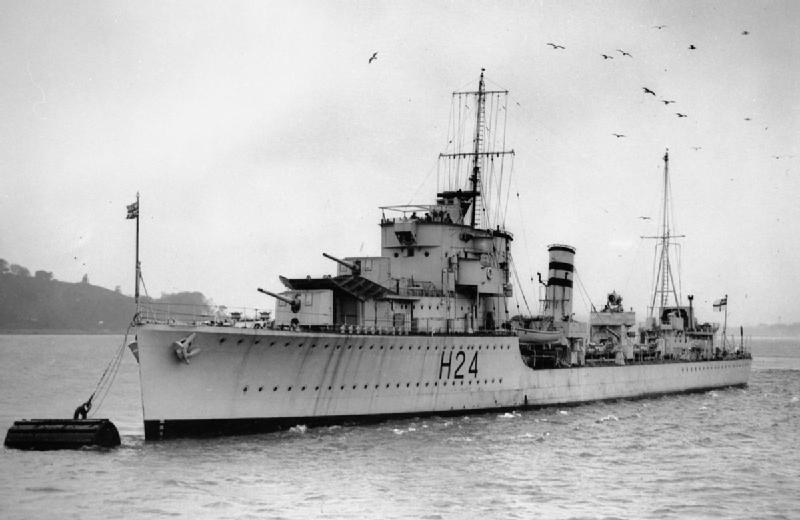

History

United Kingdom
- Name: Hasty
- Builder: William Denny & Brothers, Dumbarton
- Laid down: 15 April 1935
- Launched: 5 May 1936
- Completed: 11 November 1936
- Identification: Pennant number: H24
- Fate: Torpedoed by the German motor torpedo boat S-55 on 14 June 1942, scuttled the following day.

General characteristics as built
- Class & type: H-class destroyer
- Displacement: 1,350 long tons (1,370 t) (standard)
- Length: 323 ft (98.5 m)
- Beam: 33 ft (10.1 m)
- Draught: 12 ft 5 in (3.8 m)
- Installed power: 3 Admiralty 3-drum boilers; 34,000 shp (25,000 kW)
- Propulsion: 2 shafts; geared steam turbines
- Speed: 36 knots (67 km/h; 41 mph)
- Range: 5,530 nmi (10,240 km; 6,360 mi) at 15 knots (28 km/h; 17 mph)
- Complement: 137 (peacetime), 146 (wartime)
- Sensors & processing systems: ASDIC
- Armament: 4 × single 4.7 in (120 mm) guns; 2 × quadruple 0.5 in (12.7 mm) machine guns; 2 × quadruple 21 in (533 mm) torpedo tubes; 2 × depth charge throwers, 1 rail and 20 depth charges

HMS Hasty was an H-class destroyer of the Royal Navy during the Second World War. Built in the mid-1930s, she was assigned to the Mediterranean Fleet until the beginning of World War II. The ship transferred to Freetown, Sierra Leone, in October 1939 to hunt for German commerce raiders in the South Atlantic with Force K. Hasty returned to the British Isles in early 1940 and covered the evacuation of Allied troops from Namsos in early May 1940 during the Norwegian Campaign.

She was transferred back to the Mediterranean Fleet shortly afterwards and participated in the Battle of Calabria and the Battle of Cape Spada in July 1940. The ship took part in the Battle of Cape Matapan in March and evacuated British and Australian troops from both Greece and Crete in April and May. In June, Hasty participated in the Syria-Lebanon Campaign and was escorting convoys and the larger ships of the Mediterranean Fleet for the next year. During the Second Battle of Sirte in March 1942 she defended a convoy from an Italian battleship and several cruisers. While covering another convoy from Alexandria to Malta in June 1942 during Operation Vigorous, Hasty was torpedoed by a German motor torpedo boat and was so badly damaged that she had to be scuttled.

== Description ==
Hasty displaced 1,350 long tons (1,370 t) at standard load and 1,883 long tons (1,913 t) at deep load. The ship had an overall length of 323 feet (98.5 m), a beam of 33 feet (10.1 m) and a draught of 12 feet 5 inches (3.8 m). She was powered by Parsons geared steam turbines, driving two propeller shafts, which developed a total of 34,000 shaft horsepower (25,000 kW) and gave a maximum speed of 36 knots (67 km/h; 41 mph). Steam for the turbines was provided by three Admiralty 3-drum water-tube boilers. Hasty carried a maximum of 470 long tons (480 t) of fuel oil that gave her a range of 5,530 nautical miles (10,240 km; 6,360 mi) at 15 knots (28 km/h; 17 mph). The ship's complement was 137 officers and men in peacetime, but this increased to 146 in wartime.

The ship mounted four QF 4.7-inch (120 mm) Mark IX guns in single mounts. For anti-aircraft (AA) defence, Hasty had two quadruple 0.5 inch (12.7 mm) Vickers machine gun mounts. She was fitted with two rotating quadruple torpedo tube mounts for 21 in (533 mm) torpedoes amidships. One depth charge rail and two throwers were fitted; 20 depth charges were originally carried, but this increased to 35 shortly after the war began.

Beginning in mid-1940, the ship's anti-aircraft armament was increased, although when exactly the modifications were made is not known. The rear set of torpedo tubes was replaced by a 3-inch (76.2 mm) QF 12-pounder (3-inch (76 mm)) AA gun and the quadruple .50-calibre Vickers mounts were replaced by 20-millimetre (0.8 in) Oerlikon autocannon. Two more Oerlikon guns were also added in the forward superstructure.

== Service ==
The fifth ship of her name to serve with the RN, Hasty was laid down by William Denny and Brothers at their shipyard in Dumbarton, Scotland, on 15 April 1935. She was launched on 5 May 1936 and completed on 11 November. Excluding government-furnished equipment like the armament, the ship cost £248,611. She was assigned to the 2nd Destroyer Flotilla of the Mediterranean Fleet upon commissioning. Hasty was refitted in Devonport Dockyard in June–July 1939 and she returned to the Mediterranean afterwards.

Hasty escorted convoys between Port Said, Egypt, and Gibraltar immediately after World War II began in September. In October the ship was transferred to Freetown to hunt for German commerce raiders in the South Atlantic with Force K. The ship and her sisters, Hardy, Hereward, and Hostile, rendezvoused with the battlecruiser Renown, the aircraft carrier Ark Royal, and the light cruiser Neptune on 17 December. They refuelled in Rio de Janeiro, Brazil, before proceeding to the estuary of the River Plate in case the damaged German heavy cruiser Admiral Graf Spee attempted to escape from Montevideo, Uruguay, where she had taken refuge after the Battle of the River Plate. Hasty was ordered to the UK in January 1940 to refit and captured the German blockade runner SS Morea in the North Atlantic on 12 February en route.

The ship was assigned to the Home Fleet after completing her refit in March. Together with the destroyer Vivien, Hasty escorted the destroyer Jervis into Newcastle upon Tyne on 19–20 March after the latter ship had collided with a Swedish merchant ship in the North Sea. Weather damage prevented the ship from participating in the early stages of the Norwegian Campaign, but she escorted the aircraft carriers Glorious and Ark Royal from 21 April as their aircraft attacked German targets in Norway. Hasty was one of Glorious's escorts when the carrier returned to Scapa Flow to refuel on 27 April. Two days later, the ship escorted the convoy that evacuated British and French troops from Namsos in early May.

Hasty and the 2nd Destroyer Flotilla were ordered to the Mediterranean on 16 May, and the ship escorted the French battleship Lorraine and three British cruisers as they bombarded Bardia during the night of 20/21 June. On 9 July Hasty participated in the Battle of Calabria as an escort for the heavy ships of Force C and unsuccessfully engaged Italian destroyers and suffered no damage. During the Battle of Cape Spada on 19 July, the ship escorted Australian light cruiser HMAS Sydney and rescued some 525 survivors from the Italian cruiser Bartolomeo Colleoni together with the other escorting destroyers. Hasty and her sister Havock sank the Italian submarine Berillo on 2 October off the coast of Egypt and rescued 47 survivors between them. The ship escorted the carrier Illustrious during the Battle of Taranto on the night of 11/12 November. During the bombardment of Valona, Albania, on the night of 18/19 December, Hasty escorted the battleships Valiant and Warspite.

The ship participated in Operation Excess in January 1941, during which she escorted a convoy and then escorted the battleship Barham from Souda Bay, Crete, to Alexandria. In late February, the ship evacuated British commandos from the island of Kastelorizo, off the coast of Turkey, in the Italian Dodecanese. The commandos had defeated the small garrison in Operation Abstention, but the Italians were able to land troops on the island over the next several days and overwhelm the British forces. During the Battle of Cape Matapan on 28/29 March, Hasty escorted the four light cruisers of Force B, but was not seriously engaged during the battle. On 15 April the ship and the light cruiser Gloucester bombarded Italian positions between Bardia and Fort Capuzzo. In mid-April she escorted the fast transport Breconshire and three battleships from Alexandria to Malta, before going on to escort the battleships as they bombarded Tripoli on 20 April. After refuelling in Alexandria on 23 April, Hasty sailed for Greece to begin evacuating British and Australian troops from the beaches. On 8 May, the ship again escorted the capital ships of the Mediterranean Fleet as they covered another convoy from Alexandria to Malta. Hasty escorted the light cruisers HMS Orion and Dido as they intercepted a German convoy attempting to land troops on Crete during the night of 21/22 May. The ship evacuated British and Commonwealth troops from Crete in late May.

Hasty bombarded Vichy French positions in Lebanon on 4 July during the Syria-Lebanon Campaign, and then spent most of the rest of the year escorting convoys to Tobruk. On 25 November she was escorting the capital ships of the Mediterranean Fleet when the battleship Barham was torpedoed and sunk by German submarine U-331. While escorting a convoy, Hasty and her sister, Hotspur, sank U-79 on 23 December north of Sollum. In January 1942, the ship escorted Convoys MF.3 and MF.4 from Alexandria to Malta, but was switched to the covering force for Convoy MF.5 in mid-February. She was transferred to the 22nd Destroyer Flotilla on 24 February Hasty was escorting the merchants ships of Convoy MW.10 when the Second Battle of Sirte began on 22 March, but defended the convoy against the Italian battleship Littorio and three cruisers by threatening torpedo attacks from under the cover of a severe storm and a smoke screen. Hasty was torpedoed by the German E-Boat S-55 under the command of Oberleutnant zur See Horst Weber as she covered a large convoy to Malta during Operation Vigorous, killing 13 men. The torpedo blew off most of the bow structure and both boiler rooms started to flood. Hotspur took off her crew and scuttled her with a torpedo during the morning of 15 June 1942.
