= HMS Hero (H99) =

H-class destroyer, launched 1936

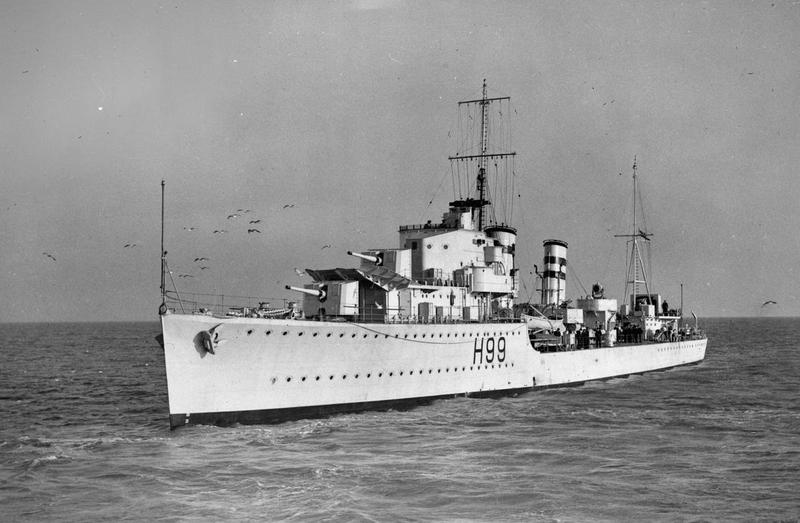
- Hero during the Interwar period

History

United Kingdom
- Name: Hero
- Builder: Vickers-Armstrongs, High Walker
- Yard number: 4
- Laid down: 28 February 1935
- Launched: 10 March 1936
- Commissioned: 23 October 1936
- Identification: Pennant number: H99
- Fate: Transferred to the Royal Canadian Navy on 15 November 1943

Canada
- Name: Chaudière
- Commissioned: 15 November 1943
- Decommissioned: 17 August 1945
- Stricken: 19 March 1946
- Honours and awards: Atlantic 1944; Normandy 1944; Biscay 1944
- Fate: Sold for scrap in 1950

General characteristics as built
- Class & type: H-class destroyer
- Displacement: 1,350 long tons (1,370 t) (standard); 1,883 long tons (1,913 t) (deep load)
- Length: 323 ft (98.5 m)
- Beam: 33 ft (10.1 m)
- Draught: 12 ft 5 in (3.8 m)
- Installed power: 34,000 shp (25,000 kW)
- Propulsion: 2 shafts, Parsons geared steam turbines; 3 Admiralty 3-drum water-tube boilers
- Speed: 36 knots (67 km/h; 41 mph)
- Range: 5,530 nmi (10,240 km; 6,360 mi) at 15 knots (28 km/h; 17 mph)
- Complement: 137 (peacetime), 146 (wartime)
- Sensors & processing systems: ASDIC
- Armament: 4 × single QF 4.7-inch (120 mm) Mk IX guns; 2 × quadruple .50 cal machine guns; 2 × quadruple 21 inch (533 mm) torpedo tubes; 20 × depth charges, 1 rail and 2 throwers

HMS Hero was an H-class destroyer built for the Royal Navy in the mid-1930s. During the Spanish Civil War of 1936–1939 the ship enforced the arms blockade imposed by Britain and France on both sides as part of the Mediterranean Fleet. During the first few months of World War II, Hero searched for German commerce raiders in the Atlantic Ocean and took part in the Second Battle of Narvik during the Norwegian Campaign of April–June 1940 before she was transferred to the Mediterranean Fleet in May where she escorted a number of convoys to Malta. The ship took part in the Battle of Cape Spada in July 1940, Operation Abstention in February 1941, and the evacuations of Greece and Crete in April–May 1941.

The ship covered an amphibious landing during the Syria–Lebanon Campaign of June 1941 and began escorting supply convoys in June to Tobruk, Libya shortly afterwards. She was damaged by German dive bombers while rescuing survivors from the minelayer Latona in October 1941 and resumed escorting convoys to Malta. Hero took part in the Second Battle of Sirte in March 1942 and in Operation Vigorous in June. She sank two German submarines whilst stationed in the Mediterranean in 1942, and was transferred back home late in the year to begin converting to an escort destroyer. The ship was transferred to the Royal Canadian Navy (RCN) in 1943 and renamed HMCS Chaudière. She became part of the Mid-Ocean Escort Force in early 1944 until her transfer back to British coastal waters in May to protect the build-up for Operation Overlord. Together with other ships, she sank three more German submarines during the year. Chaudière was refitting when the war ended in May 1945 and was in poor shape. The ship was paid off in August and later sold for scrap. The process of breaking her up, however, was not completed until 1950.

== Description and construction ==
Hero displaced 1,350 long tons (1,370 t) at standard load and 1,883 long tons (1,913 t) at deep load. The ship had an overall length of 323 feet (98.5 m), a beam of 33 feet (10.1 m) and a draught of 12 feet 5 inches (3.8 m). She was powered by Parsons geared steam turbines, driving two shafts, which developed a total of 34,000 shaft horsepower (25,000 kW) and gave a maximum speed of 36 knots (67 km/h; 41 mph). Steam for the turbines was provided by three Admiralty 3-drum water-tube boilers. Hero carried a maximum of 470 long tons (480 t) of fuel oil that gave her a range of 5,530 nautical miles (10,240 km; 6,360 mi) at 15 knots (28 km/h; 17 mph). The ship's complement was 137 officers and men in peacetime, but this increased to 146 in wartime. In Canadian service, the crew numbered 10 officers and 171 men.

The ship mounted four 4.7-inch Mk IX guns in single mounts, designated 'A', 'B', 'X', and 'Y' from front to rear. For anti-aircraft (AA) defence, Hero had two quadruple Mark I mounts for the 0.5 inch Vickers Mk III machine gun. She was fitted with two above-water quadruple torpedo tube mounts for 21-inch torpedoes. One depth charge rail and two throwers were fitted; 20 depth charges were originally carried, but this increased to 35 shortly after the war began. By mid-1940, this had increased to 44 depth charges.

Ordered on 13 December 1934 from Parsons Marine Steam Turbine Company, Hero was subcontracted to Vickers-Armstrongs and laid down by their High Walker Yard at Newcastle-on-Tyne, England, on 28 February 1935. She was launched on 10 March 1936 and completed on 21 October 1936. Excluding government-furnished equipment like the armament, the ship cost £249,858.

=== Wartime modifications ===
Most ships of Hero's class had the rear torpedo tubes replaced by a 12-pounder AA gun after the evacuation of Dunkirk in 1940, but it is not clear if she underwent this refurbishment as she was deployed in the Mediterranean until 1943. Other changes made before her conversion to an escort destroyer in 1943 probably included exchanging her two quadruple .50-calibre Vickers machine guns mounted between her funnels for two Oerlikon 20 mm AA guns, the addition of two Oerlikon guns to her searchlight platform and another pair on the wings of the ship's bridge. The ship's director-control tower and rangefinder above the bridge were most likely removed in exchange for a Type 271 target indication radar during the conversion, as was the replacement of 'B' gun by a Hedgehog anti-submarine spigot mortar, and the addition of a Type 286 short-range surface search radar. Two QF 6-pounder Hotchkiss guns were fitted on the wings of her bridge to deal with U-boats at short ranges. The ship also received a HF/DF radio direction finder mounted on a pole mainmast. 'Y' gun was also removed to allow her depth charge stowage to be increased. Late in the war, her Type 286 was replaced by a Type 291 radar.

== Career ==
Hero was assigned to the 2nd Destroyer Flotilla of the Mediterranean Fleet upon commissioning. She patrolled Spanish waters during the Spanish Civil War enforcing the policies of the Non-Intervention Committee. Hero received a refit in June–July 1939 in the UK and rejoined the Mediterranean Fleet upon its completion. The ship remained in the Mediterranean until 5 October when she was transferred to Freetown, Sierra Leone to search for German commerce raiders. Hero returned to the UK in January 1940 and received a refit at Portsmouth from 15 February to 16 March. In the meantime, the 2nd Destroyer Flotilla had been assigned to Home Fleet and the ship rejoined them when her refit was finished.

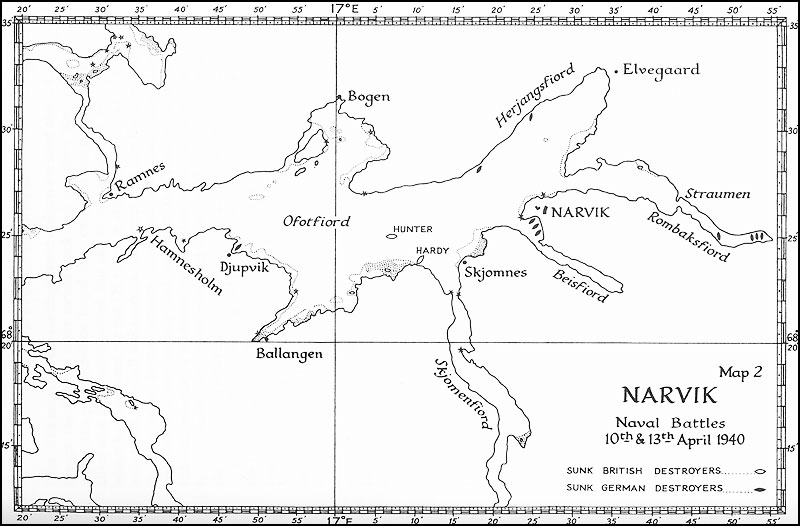
A map of the Ofotfjord

On 5 April Hero escorted the battlecruiser Renown as she covered the minelayers preparing to implement Operation Wilfred, an operation to lay mines in the Vestfjord to prevent the transport of Swedish iron ore from Narvik to Germany. The ship and her sister ship Hyperion pretended to lay a minefield off Bud, Norway on 8 April and reported its location to the Norwegians. Hero and the destroyer Foxhound streamed their TSDS minesweeping gear in advance of the battleship Warspite and her escort as they steamed up the Vestfjord to engage the remaining German destroyers at Narvik on 13 April. The ship and four other British destroyers pursued the remaining German ships into the Rombaksfjorden (the easternmost branch of the Ofotfjord), east of Narvik, where the lack of ammunition had forced the German ships to retreat. Most of the German destroyers had scuttled and beached themselves at the head of the fjord, but the scuttling charges on Z18 Hans Lüdemann had failed to detonate properly and she was boarded by a small party from Hero. They found nothing of any significance as she'd been abandoned by her crew and the destroyer put a torpedo into her to prevent any salvage.

Hero was transferred to the Mediterranean Fleet on 17 May as part of the reconstituted 2nd Destroyer Flotilla. During the Battle of Cape Spada on 19 July, the ship escorted Australian light cruiser Sydney and rescued some of the 525 survivors from the Italian cruiser Bartolomeo Colleoni together with the other escorting destroyers. Hero, together with her sister, Hostile, and the destroyers Nubian and Mohawk, were ordered to Gibraltar on 22 August where they were to join Force H. Hostile struck a mine en route on the early morning of 23 August off Cap Bon that broke her back. The explosion killed five men and wounded three others. Mohawk took off the survivors while Hero fired two torpedoes to scuttle her. The ship took part in Operation Hats in September, before refitting in Malta during November. She sortied into the North Atlantic when Convoy WS-5A reported that it had been attacked by the German cruiser Admiral Hipper on 25 December to round up the scattered ships.

On 1 January 1941, Hero was one of the ships that intercepted a Vichy French convoy off Mellila and seized all four merchant ships of the convoy. The ship took part in Operation Excess early in January 1941 and was transferred back to the Mediterranean Fleet. On 27 February, she evacuated a few surviving commandos from the island of Kastelorizo who had attacked the island in Operation Abstention. In mid-April she escorted the fast transport Breconshire and three battleships from Alexandria to Malta before going on to escort the battleships as they bombarded Tripoli on 20 April. After refueling in Alexandria on 23 April, Hero took part in Operation Demon, evacuating British and Australian troops from Greece. On 27 April Hero towed the Dutch troop ship Costa Rica, which had been damaged by a German air attack. When it was clear that the troop ship could not be saved from sinking, Hero, her sister Hereward, the destroyer Defender and cruiser Phoebe rescued all of Costa Rica's crew and all 2,600 troops. During the evacuation of Crete, Hero and the destroyer Decoy evacuated the King of Greece and his entourage on the night of 22/23 May.

Hero escorted the LSI(L) Glengyle as she conducted an amphibious landing in early June 1941 on the Lebanese coast during the opening stages of the Operation Exporter. She spent most of the rest of the year escorting convoys to Tobruk. Together with her sister Hotspur and the destroyer Encounter, the ship escorted Latona on 25 October whilst en route to Tobruk. They were attacked by Junkers Ju 87 Stuka dive bombers of I./StG 1 that hit Latona and set her afire. Hero and Encounter came alongside and rescued the crew and passengers before Latona's magazine exploded, but Hero was damaged by three near misses whilst alongside. The ship returned to Alexandria for repairs and escorted a convoy to Malta in January 1942. She took part in the 2nd Battle of Sirte on 22 March whilst escorting a convoy to Malta. Together with the Hunt-class destroyers Eridge and Hurworth on 29 May, she sank the German submarine U-568 north-east of Tobruk, at 32°42′N 24°53′E, and rescued 42 survivors.

During Operation Vigorous in June, Hero formed part of the escort for the covering force of the Mediterranean Fleet for the Malta-bound convoy. At time the ship still had not been fitted for radar. After Panzer Army Africa occupied Mersa Matruh in late June, the Admiralty ordered the submarine tenders Medway and the Greek Corinthia transferred to Haifa, but Medway was torpedoed and sunk en route despite the strong escort. Hero and the destroyer Zulu rescued 1105 survivors between them. On 17 August, the ship rescued some 1,100 survivors of the torpedoed troopship Princess Marguerite. In conjunction with four other destroyers and a Wellesley light bomber of the Royal Air Force, Hero sank U-559 60 nautical miles (110 km; 69 mi) north-east of Port Said on 30 October. The ship was ordered back to the United Kingdom, via the Cape of Good Hope, to be converted to an escort destroyer late in the year.

=== Transfer to the Royal Canadian Navy ===
Her conversion at Portsmouth lasted from April to November 1943 and Hero was transferred to the Royal Canadian Navy as a gift on 15 November 1943 and renamed HMCS Chaudière. After working up, the ship was assigned to the Escort Group C2 in February 1944, based in Derry. On 6 March 1944, whilst defending Convoy HX 228 west of Ireland, the escorts forced U-744 to the surface where she surrendered after a 32-hour hunt. The submarine could not be towed to port and was torpedoed by the British destroyer Icarus. The ship was reassigned to the 11th Escort Group in May 1944 in preparation for Operation Overlord. The group was tasked to protect Allied shipping in the English Channel and the Bay of Biscay and, together with the destroyers Ottawa and Kootenay, the ship sank U-621 in the Bay of Biscay near La Rochelle on 18 August. Two days later, the same ships sank U-984 in the Bay of Biscay west of Brest. In November, Chaudière was sent to Sydney, Nova Scotia for a refit.

The refit did not begin until late January 1945 and was still in progress when the war ended in May. She was found to be in the worst shape of any Canadian destroyer when inspected and was declared surplus to requirements on 13 June. She was paid off on 17 August 1945 and later sold for scrap to the Dominion Steel Company. Her demolition, however, was not completed until 1950.

== Poetry ==
The ship's completion on Tyneside in 1936 inspired the poet Michael Roberts to write a poem entitled "H.M.S. Hero". The poem of twelve lines in three stanzas, begins; "Pale grey, her guns hooded, decks clear of all impediment, / Easily, between the swart tugs, she glides in the pale October sunshine...".
