= Unit system of machinery =

The unit system of machinery was a method of arranging a ship's propulsion machinery into separate units that could each operate autonomously in case of damage to the ship. For a steamship, this would be a boiler room supplying steam to an engine room. There might also be a gearing room that housed the transmission that actually turned the propeller shaft(s). Ideally each "unit" should have an additional compartment between them to further reduce the risk. Many ships were able to provide steam via cross-connections from either boiler room to either engine room.

The unit system was developed during World War I to help mitigate damage and flooding from damage inflicted by a weapon and to preserve a ship's mobility by physically separating the engines and boilers into at least two groups so that a single torpedo hit, for example, could not flood all of the boiler or engine rooms, disabling all of the ship's propulsion machinery. A single World War II torpedo hit would typically blow a 35-by-15-foot (10.7 m × 4.6 m) hole in the hull and would compromise the integrity of adjacent watertight bulkheads over twice that length and further if the ship was of riveted construction rather than welded. This would usually flood two compartments and possibly three.

The unit system invariably added length to accommodate the additional piping to cross-connect the engines and boilers and the widely separated boilers required two funnels which reduced the fields of fire of the ship's anti-aircraft guns and added topweight. There could be significant knock-on costs as well. For example, the second batch of the British Leander-class light cruisers of the 1930s (which were all eventually sold to Australia) were modified to use the unit system. This increased the length of the machinery spaces by 8 feet (2.4 m) and the waterline belt armor needed to protect the boilers increased by a length of 57 feet (17.4 m). The extra weight of the armor required the beam to be increased by 1 foot 8 inches (0.51 m) to preserve stability. All of these changes made the ships more expensive than their predecessors.

== Bibliography ==
- Brown, David K. (2006). Nelson to Vanguard: Warship Design and Development 1923-1945. London: Chatham Publishing. ISBN 1-59114-602-X.
- Raven, Alan & Roberts, John (1980). British Cruisers of World War Two. Annapolis, Maryland: Naval Institute Press. ISBN 0-87021-922-7.
