= CANT 25 =

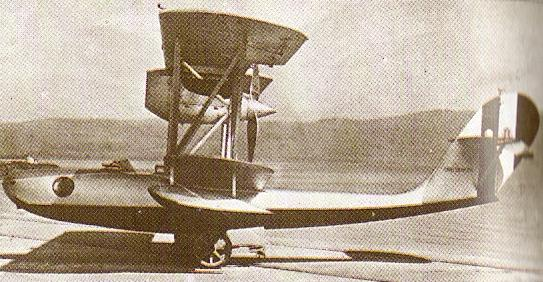
- The CANT 25M, the initial version of the CANT 25.

General information
- Type: Flying-boat fighter
- Manufacturer: CANT
- Designer: Raffaele Conflenti
- Primary user: Regia Aeronautica

History
- Introduction date: 1931
- First flight: 1927
- Retired: 1943

The CANT 25 was an Italian shipboard single-seat sesquiplane flying boat fighter that entered service with the Regia Aeronautica (Italian Royal Air Force) in 1931.

== Design and development ==
The CANT 25 was developed from the earlier CANT 18 flying boat to meet a requirement for a flying boat fighter for the Regia Aeronautica. The aircraft was of wooden construction and was armed with two fixed, forward-firing 7.7-millimeter (0.303-inch) Vickers modificate machine guns. It was built in two versions, the CANT 25M with removable wings and the CANT 25AR which was strengthened for catapult launching and had folding wings.

The CANT 25M appeared first, in 1931. It had Warren truss-type interplane bracing and a 306-kilowatt (410-horsepower) Fiat A.20 12-cylinder water-cooled engine mounted to drive a two-bladed pusher propeller, and was used for catapult trials aboard warships of the Regia Marina (Italian Royal Navy). It was replaced by the CANT 25AR—AR stood for Ali Ripiegabili, Italian for "Folding Wings"—which instead had vertical interplane bracing struts to allow the outer panels of the wings to fold to the rear. It also had strengthened tailplane bracing and a more powerful engine, a 328-kilowatt (440-horsepower) version of the Fiat A.20.

== Operational history ==
The CANT 25s were embarked on the heavy cruisers of the Zara and Trento classes, and on the light cruisers of the Giussano and Cadorna classes, on the scout Taranto during the Italo-Ethiopian War and, from 1935 to 1938 on the seaplane carrier Miraglia.

From 1937-1938 they were replaced by the IMAM Ro.43 in the role of embarked reconnaissance aircraft, being transferred to the 88º Gruppo Autonomo Caccia (88th Independent Fighter Group) at Vigna di Valle Airport and to the seaplane pilot schools as trainers, maintaining this role until 1943.

== Variants ==
CANT 25M
Initial version with detachable wings
CANT 25AR
Later version strengthened for catapult launching and with folding wings

== Operators ==
Kingdom of Italy

- Regia Aeronautica

== Specifications (25AR) ==
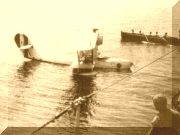

Data from The Complete Book of Fighters

General characteristics

- Length: 8.75 m (28 ft 8.5 in)
- Wingspan: 10.4 m (34 ft 1.5 in)
- Height: 3.12 m (10 ft 3 in)
- Wing area: 30.9 m^{2} (333 sq ft)
- Powerplant: 1 × Fiat A.20 12-cylinder water-cooled, 330 kW (440 hp)
- Propellers: 2-bladed

Performance

- Maximum speed: 245 km/h (152 mph, 132 kn) at sea level
- Range: 900 km (560 mi, 490 nmi) at 120 km/h (75 mph; 65 kn)
- Time to altitude: 26 min 30 sec to 5,000 m (16,000 ft)

Armament

- Guns: 2 × fixed, forward-firing 7.7 mm (.303 in) Vickers modificate machine guns in the bow

== See also ==
Related lists

- List of Interwar military aircraft
- List of flying boats and floatplanes
