= List of cruisers of Italy =

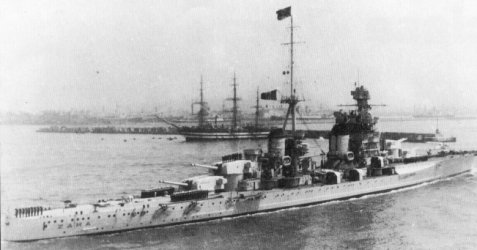
Heavy cruiser Zara in 1940

This is a list of all modern cruisers built by Italy, starting from the 1880s.

== Protected cruisers ==
- Giovanni Bausan (1883) - Sold 1920
- Etna class
  - Etna (1885) - Sold 1921
  - Vesuvio (1886) - Sold 1911
  - Stromboli (1886) - Sold 1907
  - Ettore Fieramosca (1888) - Sold 1909
- Dogali (1885) - Sold to Uruguay 1908 and renamed Montevideo, BU 1932
- Piemonte (1888) - Sold 1920
- Regioni class
  - Umbria (1891) - Sold to Haiti 1911 and renamed Consul Gostrück, BU 1913
  - Lombardia (1890) - Sold 1920
  - Etruria (1891) - Sank 1918
  - Liguria (1893) - Sold 1921
  - Elba (1893) - Transformed to seaplane tender 1915, Stricken 1921, Sold 1923
  - Puglia (1898) - Stricken 1923, front of ship preserved at Gardone
- Calabria (1894) - Stricken 1924
- Libia (1912) - Built for the Ottoman Empire as Drama. Seized by Italy 1911, BU 1937
- Quarto (1911) - Sold 1938, BU after 1939
- Nino Bixio class
  - Nino Bixio (1911) - Stricken 1929, BU
  - Marsala (1912) - Stricken 1927, BU
- Campania class
  - Campania (1914) - Sank after explosion in 1919, Refloated 1920, BU 1921
  - Basilicata (1914) - Stricken 1937

== Torpedo cruisers ==
- Pietro Micca (1876)
- Tripoli (1886)
- Goito class
  - Goito (1888)
  - Monzambano (1889)
  - Montebello (1889)
  - Confienza (1890)
- Folgore class
  - Folgore
  - Saetta

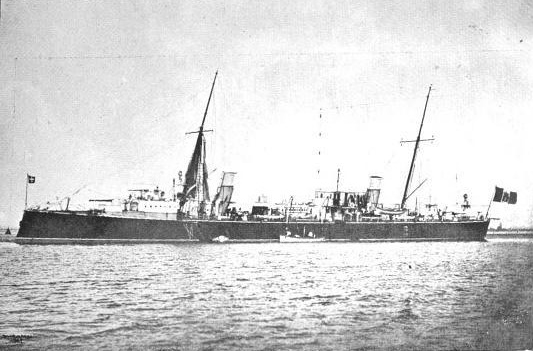
Partenope c. 1895

- Partenope class
  - Partenope
  - Minerva
  - Euridice
  - Urania
  - Iride
  - Aretusa
  - Caprera
  - Calatafimi
- Agordat class
  - Agordat (1899) - Stricken 1923
  - Coatit (1899) - Stricken 1920, BU

== Scout cruisers ==
- Aquila-class
  - Aquila
  - Sparviero
  - Nibbio
  - Falco

== Light cruisers ==
- Taranto (1911, ex-German Strassburg) - scuttled 1943, sunk 1943 & 1944, BU 1946 or later
- Bari (1914, ex-German Pillau) - Sunk 1943, BU 1948
- Brindisi (ex-Austrian Helgoland) - Stricken 1937, BU
- Venezia (ex-Austrian Saida) - Stricken 1937, BU
- Ancona (ex-German Graudenz) - Stricken 1937, BU

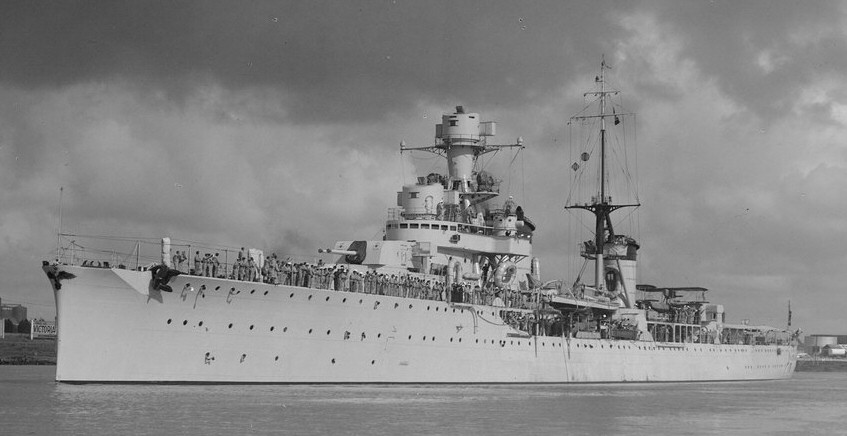
Cruiser Armando Diaz in 1935.

- Giussano class
  - Alberico da Barbiano (1930) - Sunk 1941
  - Alberto di Giussano (1930) - Sunk 1941
  - Bartolomeo Colleoni (1930) - Sunk 1940
  - Giovanni dalle Bande Nere (1930) - Sunk 1942
- Luigi Cadorna class
  - Luigi Cadorna (1931) - BU 1950s
  - Armando Diaz (1932) - Sunk 1941
- Raimondo Montecuccoli class
  - Raimondo Montecuccoli (1934) - BU 1960s
  - Muzio Attendolo (1934) - Sunk 1942
- Duca d'Aosta class
  - Emanuele Filiberto Duca d'Aosta (1934) - Transferred to Soviet Union 1949, renamed first Stalingrad, than Kerch
  - Eugenio di Savoia (1935) - Transferred to Greece 1951, renamed Elli
- Duca degli Abruzzi class
  - Luigi di Savoia Duca degli Abruzzi (1936) - BU 1961 or later
  - Giuseppe Garibaldi (1936) - BU 1970s

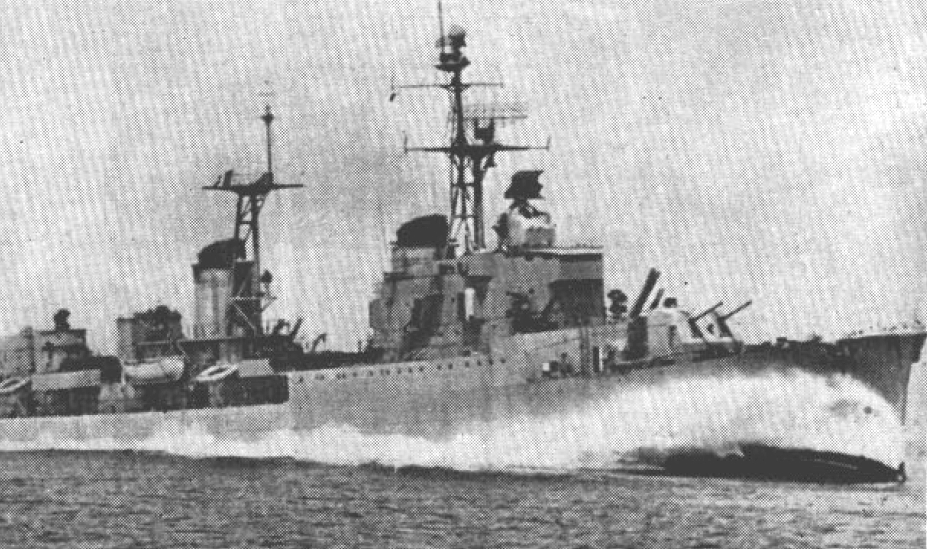
San Giorgio (ex-Pompeo Magno) after her post-war conversion to a large destroyer.

- Capitani Romani class (Only those units marked * were completed)
  - Attilio Regolo* (1940) - Sold to France 1948 and renamed Chateaurenault
  - Scipione Africano* (1941) - Sold to France 1948 and renamed Guichen
  - Pompeo Magno* (1941) - Renamed San Giorgio, rebuilt as large destroyer 1951-55, BU 1980
  - Ulpio Traiano (1942) - Torpedoed 1943
  - Ottaviano Augusto (1942) - Sunk 1943
  - Cornelio Silla (1941) - Sunk 1944
  - Claudio Druso (-) - BU
  - Caio Mario (1941) - Scuttled 1943/44
  - Paolo Emilio (-) - BU
  - Vipsania Agrippa (-) - BU
  - Giulio Germanico (1941) - Renamed San Marco, rebuilt as large destroyer 1951-55, BU 1971/80
  - Claudio Tiberio (-)
- Etna class (not completed)
  - Etna (1942) - Scuttled 1943, Refloated, BU postwar
  - Vesuvio (1941) - Scuttled 1943, Refloated, BU postwar
- Cattaro (ex-Yugoslav Dalmacija, captured 1941, ex-German Niobe, purchased 1924) - Torpedoed 1943
- FR 11 (ex-French Jean de Vienne, captured 1943) - Captured by Germany 1943, sunk 1944
- FR 12 (ex-French La Galissonniere, captured 1943) - Captured by Germany 1943, sunk 1944

== Armored cruisers ==
- Marco Polo (1892) - Sold for BU 1922
- Vettor Pisani class
  - Vettor Pisani (1895) - Stricken 1920
  - Carlo Alberto (1896) - Stricken 1920
- Giuseppe Garibaldi class
  - Giuseppe Garibaldi (1895) - To Argentina as General Garibaldi, BU 1935
  - Varese (1896) - To Argentina as General San Martin, BU 1935
  - Varese (1897) - To Argentina as General Belgrano, BU 1948
  - Giuseppe Garibaldi (c. 1896) - To Spain as Cristóbal Colón 1897, sunk at the Battle of Santiago de Cuba, 1898
  - Giuseppe Garibaldi (1897) - To Argentina as General Pueyrredon, removed 1954
  - Varese (1899)
  - Giuseppe Garibaldi (1899)
  - Francesco Ferruccio (1902)
  - Mitra (1902) - To Argentina as Bernardino Rivadavia - To Japan as Kasuga, sunk 1945
  - San Rocco (1903) - To Argentina as Mariano Moreno - To Japan as Nisshin, sunk 1942

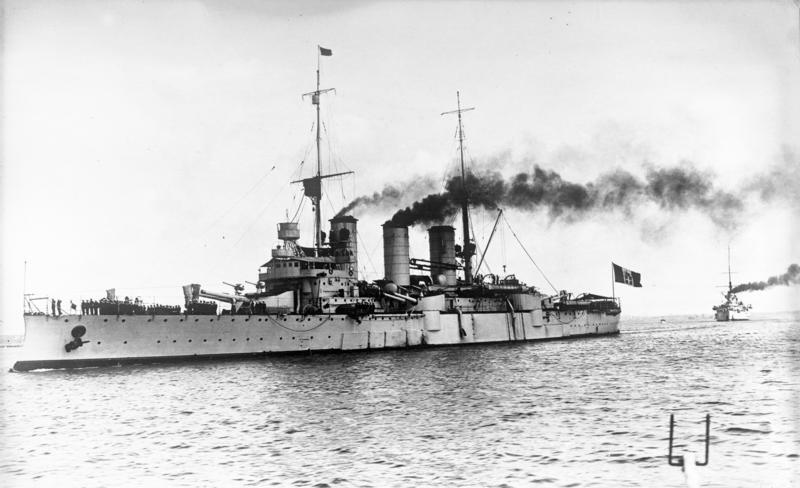
Pisa in 1932

- Pisa class
  - Pisa (1907) - Sold 1937
  - Amalfi (1908) - Torpedoed 1915
- San Giorgio class
  - San Giorgio (1908) - Scuttled 1941
  - San Marco (1908) - Captured by Germany 1943, sunk c. 1944

== Heavy cruisers ==
- Trento class
  - Trento (1927) - Sunk 1942
  - Trieste (1926) - Sunk 1943
- Zara class
  - Zara (1930) - Sunk 1941
  - Pola (1931) - Sunk 1941
  - Fiume (1930) - Sunk 1941
  - Gorizia (1930) - Sunk 1944
- Bolzano (1932) - Sunk 1944

== Helicopter cruisers ==
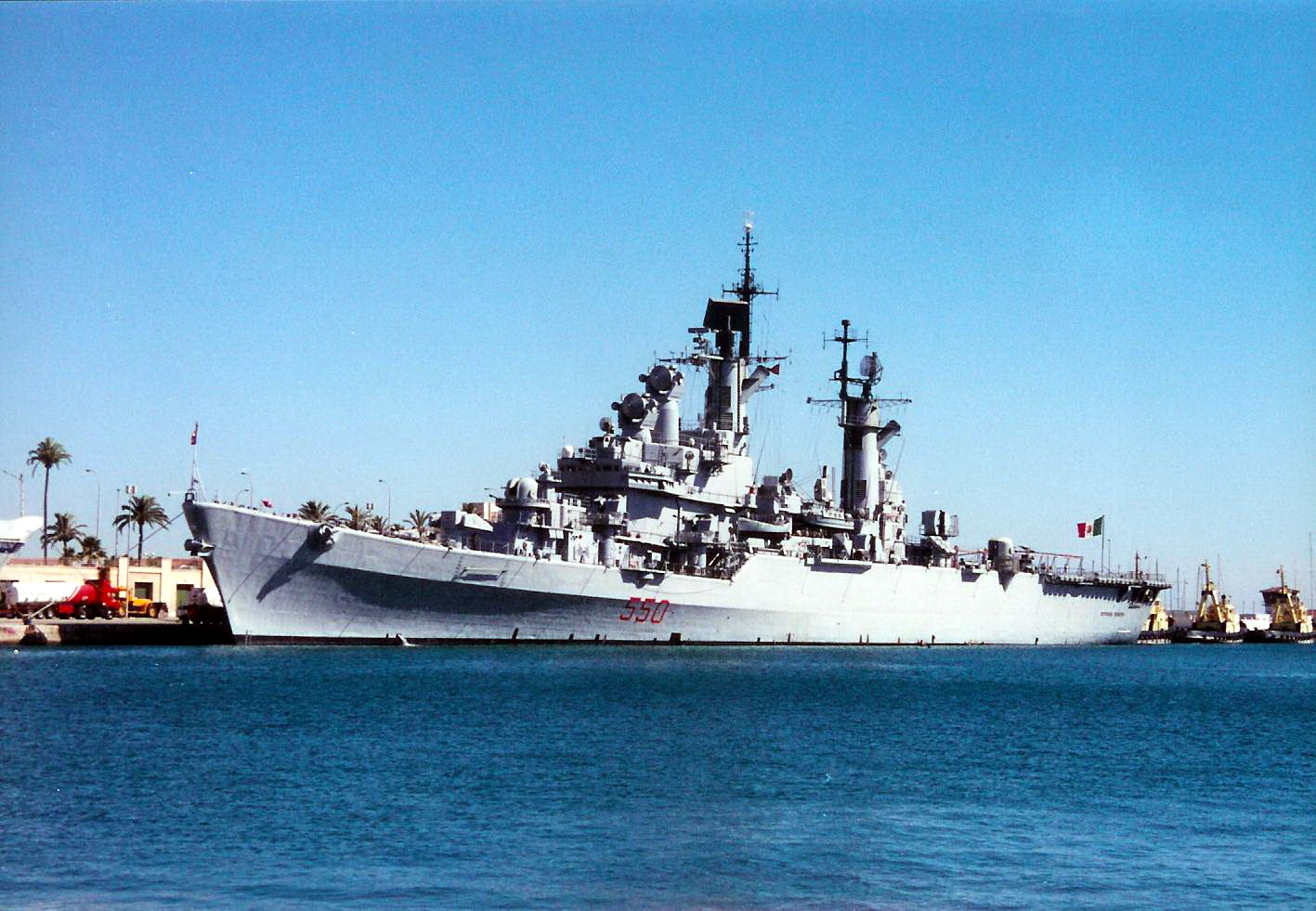
Vittorio Veneto

- Andrea Doria class
  - Andrea Doria in commission from 1964 - 1992
  - Caio Duilio in commission from 1964 - 1989
- Vittorio Veneto (1969) - BU 2006

== See also ==
- List of battleships of Italy
