= Italian cruiser Emanuele Filiberto Duca d'Aosta =

WWII Italian naval vessel

History

Italy
- Name: Emanuele Filiberto Duca d'Aosta
- Namesake: Prince Emanuele Filiberto, Duke of Aosta
- Builder: O.T.O., Livorno
- Laid down: 29 October 1932
- Launched: 22 April 1934
- Commissioned: 13 July 1935
- Fate: Ceded to the Soviet Union as war reparation, March 1949

Soviet Union
- Name: Kerch
- Acquired: 2 March 1949
- Commissioned: 30 March 1949
- Stricken: 20 February 1959
- Fate: Scrapped

General characteristics
- Class & type: Condottieri-class cruiser
- Displacement: 8,450 t (8,317 long tons) standard; 10,539 t (10,373 long tons) full load
- Length: 186.9 m (613 ft 2 in)
- Beam: 17.5 m (57 ft 5 in)
- Draught: 6.1 m (20 ft 0 in)
- Propulsion: 2 shaft Belluzzo/Parsons geared turbines; 6 Yarrow boilers; 110,000 hp (82,027 kW)
- Speed: 36.5 knots (67.6 km/h; 42.0 mph)
- Range: 3,900 nmi (7,200 km) at 14 knots (26 km/h; 16 mph)
- Complement: 578
- Armament: 8 × 152 mm (6 in)/53 OTO Model 1929 naval guns (4×2); 6 × 100 mm (4 in)/47 OTO Model 1928 naval guns (3×2); 8 × 37 mm (1.5 in)/54 Breda Model 1932 AA cannons (4×2); 12 × 13.2 mm (0.52 in)/76 Breda Model 1931 AA machine guns (6×2); 6 × 21 in (533 mm) torpedo tubes (2×3)
- Armour: Deck: 35 mm (1.4 in); Main belt: 70 mm (2.8 in); Turrets: 90 mm (3.5 in); Conning tower: 100 mm (3.9 in)
- Aircraft carried: 2 or 3 Ro.43 floatplanes
- Aviation facilities: 1 catapult

Emanuele Filiberto Duca d'Aosta was an Italian light cruiser of the fourth group of the Condottieri-class, that served in the Regia Marina during World War II. She survived the war, but was ceded as war reparation to the Soviet Navy in 1949. She was finally renamed Kerch and served in the Black Sea Fleet until the 1960s.

== Design ==
Duca d'Aosta was the namesake of the fourth subclass of Condottieri light cruisers. The design of the Duca d'Aostas derived from the preceding Montecuccoli class, with a slight increase in size and a significant increase in armour. The machinery was also re-arranged.

Duca d'Aosta was built by OTO, Livorno and was named after Emanuele Filiberto, 2nd Duke of Aosta, an Italian Field Marshal of World War I.

== Career ==
The ship joined the 7th Cruiser Division. Duca d'Aosta took part actively of the Italian intervention in the Spanish Civil War, when the cruiser shelled the port of Valencia on 15 February 1937. In 1938 departed on a circumnavigation with her sister-ship, Eugenio Di Savoia. The deteriorating world political situation caused this to be cut short after visits to the Caribbean and South America, and the ships returned La Spezia in March 1939.

=== World War II ===
At the Italian entry into the war, Duca d'Aosta was part of the 2nd Cruiser Squadron and participated in the Battle of Punta Stilo between 6–10 July. In addition, she protected North Africa convoys, took part in a fleet sortie against British cruisers and bombarded Corfu on 18 December.

During 1941, Duca d'Aosta served mostly with the 8th Cruiser Division, laying minefields off North Africa and protecting convoys. One of the convoy duties, in December, led to the First Battle of Sirte, in which Duca d'Aosta took part.

Her duties in 1942 were much as before, but with aggressive actions against Allied convoys, including the Operations Harpoon and Vigorous, in June, to resupply the British controlled island of Malta. She sailed in August to intercept the critical Pedestal convoy, but this sortie was abandoned due to poor air cover. On 13 June 1942, Duca d'Aosta survived a torpedo attack by the British submarine HMS Unison, while south of Sardinia with the Raimondo Montecuccoli.

In 1943, Duca d'Aosta was inactive due to fuel shortages for most of the remainder of the year, but in August, she attempted, unsuccessfully, a bombardment of Allied positions around Palermo.

Duca d'Aosta was a "lucky ship" in that she never was damaged in any of the naval actions in which she participated nor was she ever damaged by air attack or submarine attack.

=== Allied service ===
After the Italian Armistice, Duca d'Aosta had a minor refit at Taranto and in October 1943, with the cruisers Luigi di Savoia Duca degli Abruzzi and Giuseppe Garibaldi, she sailed to the South Atlantic, to serve with the Allies on shipping blockade duties, based at Freetown. There were seven patrols between November 1943 and February 1944; she returned to Italy in April and, thereafter, was used only for transport.

=== Postwar ===
Duca d'Aosta was transferred to the Soviet Union on 2 March 1949 and served as Kerch in the Black Sea Fleet. The cruiser became a training ship in February 1956. Kerch was stricken on 20 February 1959 and scrapped.
