= Giovanni Galati =

Italian admiral

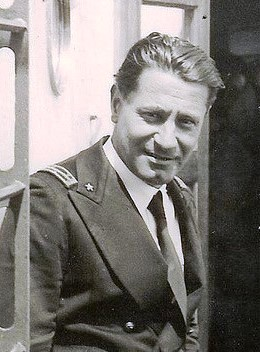
- Born: 19 September 1897; Naples, Campania, Italy
- Died: 15 October 1971 (aged 74); Rome, Lazio, Italy
- Military career
- Allegiance: Kingdom of Italy
- Branch: Regia Marina
- Service years: 1912–1946
- Rank: Ammiraglio di Divisione (Vice Admiral)
- Commands: Carso (armed pontoon); Angelo Bassini (destroyer); Cesare Battisti (destroyer); San Marco Battalion; Quarto (scout cruiser); Raimondo Montecuccoli (light cruiser); Ugolino Vivaldi (destroyer); 14th Destroyer Squadron; Tobruk Naval Base; Light Cruiser Group
- Conflicts: Italo-Turkish War; World War I; Battles of the Isonzo; Second Italo-Ethiopian War; World War II; Battle of Calabria
- Awards: Silver Medal of Military Valor (four times); Bronze Medal of Military Valor (twice); War Cross for Military Valor; War Merit Cross; Military Order of Italy; Order of the Crown of Italy; Colonial Order of the Star of Italy; Iron Cross Second Class

Giovanni Galati (19 September 1897 – 15 October 1971) was an Italian admiral during World War II. During the war, he commanded the Ugolino Vivaldi and participated in the Battle of Calabria. He became Chief of Staff of the Naval High Command Libya and was then, again, given command of the 14th Destroyer Squadron and then the Light Cruisers Group. He refused to surrender his ship when the armistice was agreed and was brought up on charges but eventually released and reinstated to active duty. He finished his service as Vice Admiral in 1947 and was awarded the Knight's Cross of the Military Order of Italy.

== Biography ==
=== Early life and career ===
Galati was born in Naples on 19 September 1897, the son of Roberto Galati and Clotilde Ciollaro; after attending the Italian Naval Academy from 1912 to 1916, he graduated with the rank of ensign on 27 April 1916. He participated in the Italo-Turkish War as a cadet aboard the training ships Flavio Gioia and Amerigo Vespucci. He took part in World War I, first embarked on battleships including Duilio and then on the land front, in command of the self-propelled armed pontoon Carso, operating with the 3rd Army. In June 1918 he distinguished himself in an action near Caposile (on the Piave river), receiving a Silver Medal of Military Valor.

After the war he was promoted to lieutenant and assigned in 1920-1921 on the battleship Roma, stationed in South America, and then in 1923-1924 he served on the hydrographic vessel Ammiraglio Magnaghi in Red Sea. After promotion to lieutenant commander, as one of the most brilliant officers in the Navy, he attended the Royal Italian Army War School, and then commanded in succession the destroyers Angelo Bassini and Cesare Battisti. In 1932 he was promoted to commander, and two years later he was sent to China in command of the San Marco Battalion. Between 1935 and 1936 he took part in the Second Italo-Ethiopian War as executive officer of the scout cruiser Quarto, deployed in Somalia. In 1937 he became commanding officer of the same ship, and participated in the naval operations during the Spanish Civil War. On 9 June 1938 he was promoted to captain, and in the following year he was given command of the light cruiser Raimondo Montecuccoli.

=== World War II ===
Upon Italy's entry into World War II, on 10 June 1940, Galati was in command of the 14th Destroyer Squadron, with flag on the destroyer Ugolino Vivaldi. In command of Vivaldi, he participated in the Battle of Calabria and on 1 August 1940 he rammed and sank the British submarine Oswald. For a year and a half, from June 1940 to December 1941, Galati carried out dozens of missions as escort leader of supply convoys sailing between Italy and North Africa, gaining a reputation for "never losing a ship". This was credited to the fact that he often disregarded orders coming from Supermarina, instead basing his decisions on his own assessment and experience; like other officers at the time, he was convinced that traitors hiding in the high ranks were informing the Allies about the convoys sailing for Africa, and that disregarding the instructions would reduce the risk of being intercepted (actually, the interception of many convoys was not caused by traitors, but instead by Ultra intercepts, whose existence was unknown to the Axis).

He left command of Vivaldi on 7 January 1942, when he became Chief of Staff of the Naval High Command Libya; on 24 June 1942 he became commander of the Tobruk naval base, immediately after the city was recaptured by Axis forces in the Battle of Gazala. After a brief assignment in the command of the Naval Battle Force, he was given again command of the 14th Destroyer Squadron from 1 February to 11 August 1943. On 25 July 1943 he was promoted to rear admiral, and on August 12 he was given command of the Light Cruisers Group, composed of Luigi Cadorna, Pompeo Magno and Scipione Africano.

After the armistice of Cassibile was announced, Galati refused to surrender and declared that he would never hand over his ship to British in Malta, declaring that he would rather sail to the North, or look for one last battle, or to scuttle his ships. Admiral Bruto Brivonesi, his superior, vainly tried to convince him to obey the orders of the King, then put him under arrest in the Taranto fortress.

He was sent to Brindisi and brought before the Minister of the Navy, Admiral Raffaele de Courten; on orders from King Victor Emanuel III, Galati was released and reinstated to active duty, with no consequences for his career. Shortly thereafter, he learned of the struggle by the 33rd Infantry Division "Acqui" against the Germans on the island of Kefalonia; with the tacit approval of De Courten, Galati took the initiative to load ammunitions, medicines and other supplies on the torpedo boats Sirio and Clio and sailed towards Kefalonia to supply the Italian garrison, taking direct command of the expedition. When the Allied command learned of the unauthorized departure, however, fearing that the ships would escape to a neutral port or defect to the Germans, they ordered them to abort the mission and go back to port. No further attempts were made to help the "Acqui" Division; a few days later the Kefalonia garrison was forced to surrender and massacred by the Germans.

Galati was later assigned to Naval Command Naples for a short time and then transferred to the Ministry of the Navy, where he held special assignments. A staunch monarchist, he left active duty on 16 June 1946 following the proclamation of the Republic. He was promoted vice admiral in 1947 and awarded the Knight's Cross of the Military Order of Italy, finally being discharged on 8 August 1955.

== Death ==
He died in Rome on 15 October 1971.
