= HMS Unison =

Submarine of the Royal Navy

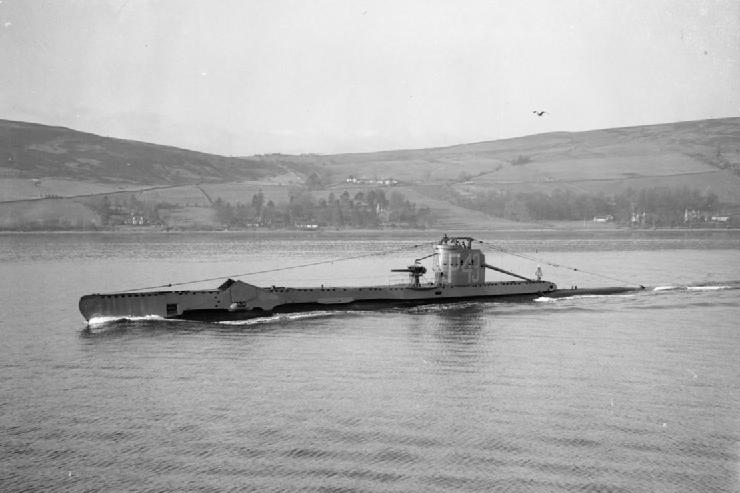

History

United Kingdom
- Name: HMS Unison
- Builder: Vickers-Armstrongs, Barrow-in-Furness
- Laid down: 30 December 1940
- Launched: 5 November 1941
- Commissioned: 19 February 1942
- Out of service: transferred to Soviet Navy 26 June 1944
- Fate: Scrapped May 1950

Soviet Union
- Name: V-3
- Acquired: 26 June 1944
- Fate: Returned to Royal Navy in 1949

General characteristics
- Class & type: U-class submarine
- Displacement: Surfaced - 540 tons standard, 630 tons full load; Submerged - 730 tons
- Length: 58.22 m (191 ft 0 in)
- Beam: 4.90 m (16 ft 1 in)
- Draught: 4.62 m (15 ft 2 in)
- Propulsion: 2 shaft diesel-electric; 2 Paxman Ricardo diesel generators + electric motors; 615 / 825 hp
- Speed: 11.25 kn (20.84 km/h; 12.95 mph) max surfaced; 10 kn (19 km/h; 12 mph) max submerged
- Complement: 27-31
- Armament: 4 x bow internal 21 inch (533 mm)torpedo tubes - 8 - 10 torpedoes; 1 x 3-inch (76 mm) gun

HMS Unison (P43) was a Royal Navy U-class submarine built by Vickers-Armstrongs at Barrow-in-Furness, and part of the third group of that class. She is the only craft of the Royal Navy to have borne the name Unison. Prior to receiving the name, she carried the pennant number P43 and was unofficially known as Ulysses. She was renamed Unison in 1943.

== Career ==
Unison spent most of her wartime career in the Mediterranean, where she sank the Italian merchants Enrichetta, Marco Foscarini and Terni, the Italian sailing vessels Luigi Verni, Carlo P. and Angela, the German coaster Jaedjoer and the Italian tanker Zeila. She also damaged the Italian tanker Pozarica, and unsuccessfully torpedoed the Italian merchant Chisone and a medium-sized tanker identified as the Italian auxiliary Cerere.

She took part in operation Harpoon, when she torpedoed an Italian cruiser force composed of the light cruisers Raimondo Montecuccoli and Emanuele Filiberto Duca d'Aosta without hitting any target on 13 June 1942. On 2 August 1943 Unison was fired on in error by the American tanker Yankee Arrow off Cape Bon, causing damage to her pressure hull, although she was able to return to dock at Bizerte under her own power. The attack killed the officer of the watch, and severely injured three other crew members, including her captain, Lieutenant Anthony Daniell DSO DSC.

She was transferred to the Soviet Navy on 26 June 1944, and renamed V-3 (B-3 in Russian). She spent five years in Soviet service, being returned in 1949 and scrapped at Stockton in May 1950.

During War Week, March 1942, HMS Unison was adopted by the people of Ashby-de-la-Zouch. Both the rural district council and the urban district council of Ashby were later presented with plaques commemorating their support for the vessel and her crew. These plaques were recently discovered, reunited and presented to Ashby de la Zouch museum to be put on display.
