= Battle of Calabria =

World War II naval battle

- Part of the Battle of the Mediterranean of the Second World War
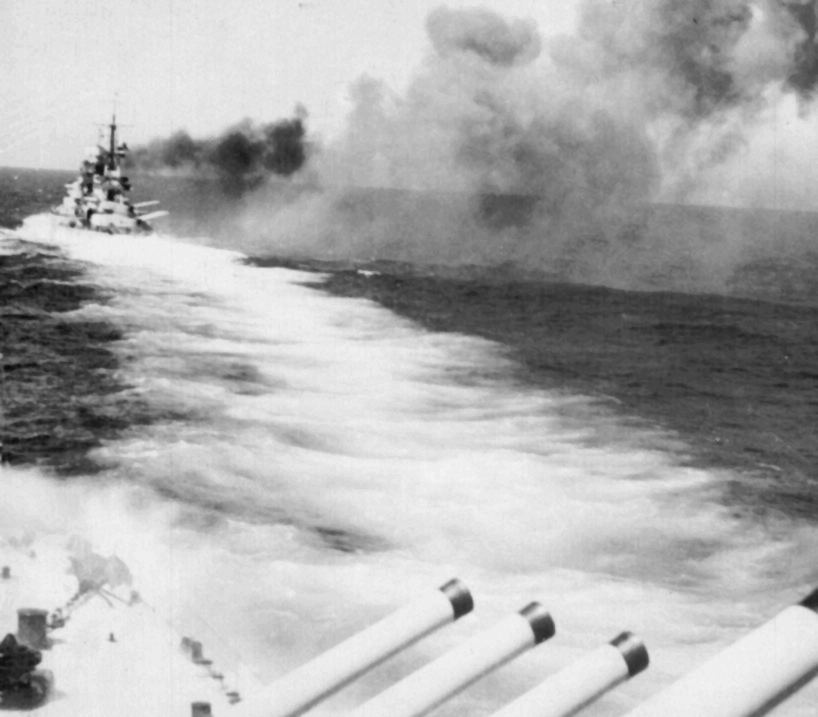
- Italian battleship Giulio Cesare, 9 July 1940
Date	9 July 1940
Location	Off Calabria, Mediterranean Sea 37°40′N 17°20′E
Result	Inconclusive

Belligerents
United Kingdom; Australia	Italy

Commanders and leaders
Andrew Cunningham	Inigo Campioni

Strength
1 aircraft carrier; 3 battleships; 5 light cruisers (1 Australian); 16 destroyers	2 battleships; 6 heavy cruisers; 8 light cruisers; 16 destroyers

Casualties and losses
2 light cruiser damaged; 2 destroyers damaged	1 battleship damaged; 1 heavy cruiser damaged; 1 destroyer damaged

The Battle of Calabria (Battaglia di Punta Stilo) on 9 July 1940, was a naval battle during the Battle of the Mediterranean in the Second World War between ships of the Regia Marina and those of the Mediterranean Fleet. The battle took place 30 nmi (56 km; 35 mi) to the east of Punta Stilo, Calabria.

Both fleets went to sea to protect convoys that reached their destinations and both had signals intelligence giving them notice of their opponent's intentions and both had air support, the Italians from land-based aircraft and the British from the aircraft carrier HMS Eagle.

The battle involved many ships on both sides but it was indecisive and the ships returned to base; it was the first battleship engagement between the Italians and the British.

== Background ==
=== Convoy TCM ===
When Italy entered the Second World War, Marshal Rodolfo Graziani, commander of the Italian forces in Libya demanded reinforcements and supplies. Graziani also wanted to wait for spring before invading Egypt, much to the disgust of Benito Mussolini, the Italian dictator, who wanted a victory to match that of Germany over France. Graziani claimed another 13,000 troops and 40,000 long tons (41,000 t) of supplies but since the declaration of war on 10 June, the Regia Marina had delivered little of this in solo ship voyages and submarine deliveries. Plans were made to run a convoy from Naples with 2,190 troops, 72 Fiat M11/39 tanks, 232 other vehicles, 10,445 long tons (10,613 t) of supplies and 5,720 long tons (5,810 t) of fuel to sail on 6 July.

A close escort was provided by the 5th, 6th and 14th Torpedo Boat Squadrons with Orione, Orsa, Pegaso and Procione. The four ships from Naples would rendezvous with the freighter Francesco Barbero from Catania, escorted by Giuseppe Cesare Abba and Rosolino Pilo. The 2nd Light Cruiser Division with the 6-inch cruisers Giovanni delle Bande Nere and Bartolomeo Colleoni and the 10th Destroyer Squadron comprising Grecale, Libeccio, Maestrale and Scirocco would also join the escorts.

A reconnaissance sortie by the Regia Aeronautica mistakenly reported on 7 July that British cruisers had arrived in Malta, having seen the destroyers HMS Diamond and Jervis and this prompted Supermarina to prepare a much larger escort effort in case of action with the Mediterranean Fleet. A second group sailed 35 mi (56 km) to the east consisting of six heavy cruisers and another four destroyers. The main battle group consisted of the battleships (Giulio Cesare and Conte di Cavour), eight light cruisers and another 16 destroyers.

=== Operation MA 5 ===
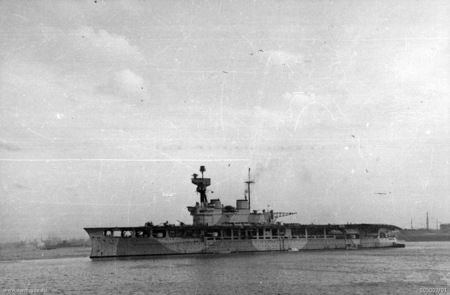
The aircraft carrier, HMS Eagle, at Alexandria in December 1940.

The British were involved in a similar convoy action. The fleet sailed from Alexandria bound for Malta where the destroyers would deliver supplies and a limited number of specialist reinforcements. Two convoys from Malta to Alexandria were waiting to bring back fleet stores and civilians from Malta to Alexandria. The fast Convoy MF 1 with three ships at 13 kn (24 km/h; 15 mph) and the slow Convoy MS 1 with five ships at 9 kn (17 km/h; 10 mph) were waiting to depart Malta. The destroyers Diamond and Jervis had been sent to Malta to join HMAS Vendetta to escort the convoys. Distant cover was provided by the Mediterranean Fleet (Admiral Andrew Cunningham) in three groups of ships, Force A, with five cruisers and a destroyer; Force B, with the battleship Warspite and five destroyers and Force C, the main battle group, with the battleships HMS Royal Sovereign and Malaya, the aircraft carrier HMS Eagle and eleven destroyers. Imperial, had to return to Alexandria with a burst steam pipe on the early hours of 8 July.

== Prelude ==
=== 8 July ===
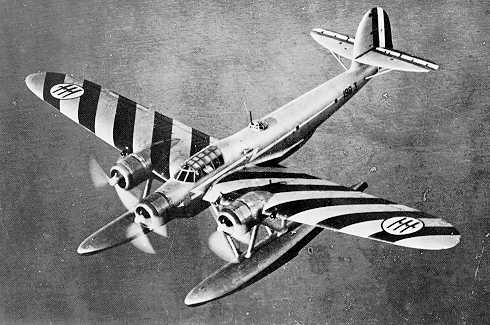
Example of a Cant Z.506 in flight

At 14:40 on 8 July two Italian Cant Z.506 seaplanes from Tobruk spotted the British fleet and shadowed it for nearly four hours. Campioni ordered his fleet to defend the convoy by turning eastwards and preparing for action. Comando Supremo (supreme command of the armed forces) was reluctant to risk its warships in a night action and they ordered the fleet to avoid contact. The Italians suffered technical problems on three destroyers and two light cruisers that, with several additional destroyers, were detached to refuel in Sicily. To make up for the detachments another destroyer group was summoned from Taranto. The Italian fleet had 16 destroyers available.

From 10:00 to 18:40, 72 land-based bombers of the Regia Aeronautica (the Italian Royal Air Force) attacked the British. Unlike the dive-bombers favoured by the Germans, Italian bombers operated in formations from about 12,000 ft (3,700 m). Scores of bombs were dropped by the Italians and hit HMS Gloucester on its compass platform. The captain, six officers and eleven ratings were killed, three officers and six ratings were wounded. The forward fire control and the steering equipment was destroyed and command was moved to the emergency station.

=== 8/9 July ===
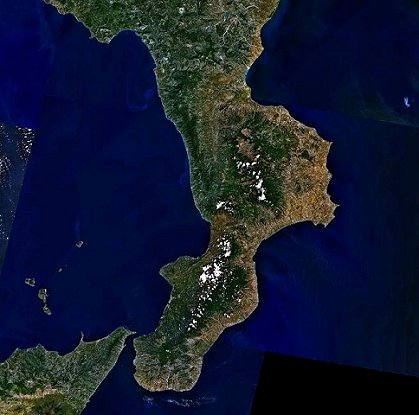
Satellite photograph of Calabria

At 15:10 on 8 July, Cunningham's fleet steamed toward Taranto, to cut the Italians' return route. At dusk, Cunningham changed course from 310° to 260° and slowed the fleet speed. During the first hours of 9 July, they took a 305° course, to avoid the Italian air reconnaissance while keeping their fleet between the Italian squadron and the Gulf of Taranto. By 12:30, the Italian Supreme Command was unaware of the situation of the British fleet. Campioni told his fleet to scramble by 14:00 about 60 nautical miles (110 km; 69 mi) south east of Cape Spartivento in search of the British. Campioni eventually received reports of the British position at 13:30, and six Ro.43 floatplanes launched shortly after by the Italian cruisers spotted the British warships 30 miles closer than supposed. By late evening of 8 July, the Italian convoy had arrived in Benghazi unscathed.

== Battle ==
=== 9 July ===
==== Afternoon ====
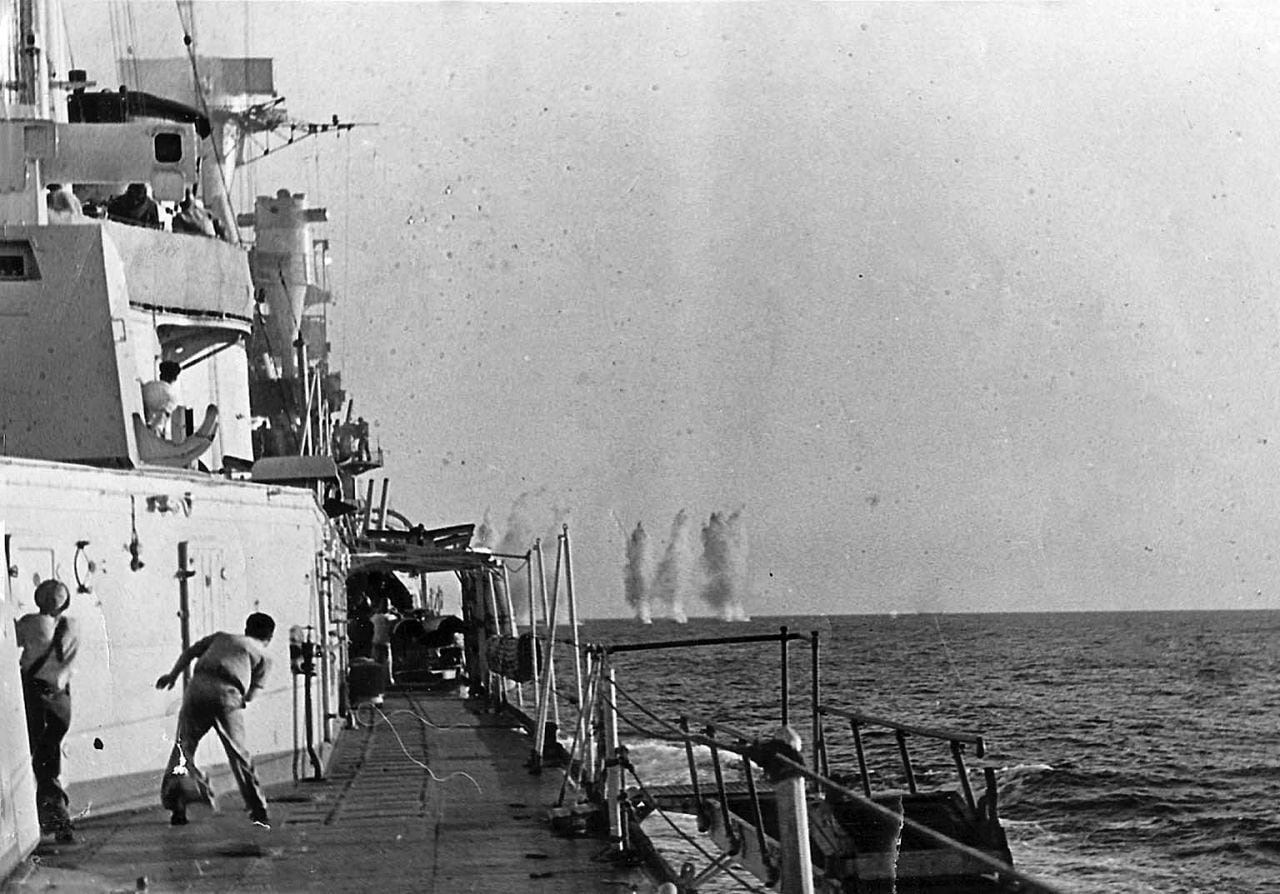
Italian sailors watch British shells land near their ship in the Battle of Calabria

At noon on 9 July the two fleets were 90 mi (140 km) apart. Cunningham could not close the distance to engage with the further back formation of Malaya and the significantly slower Royal Sovereign (18 kn (33 km/h; 21 mph) vs 28 kn (52 km/h; 32 mph)) and advanced with Warspite. At 13:15, Eagle launched several unsuccessful sorties by Swordfish torpedo-bombers against the Italian heavy cruisers, which they mistook for battleships. At 13:10, Comando Supremo had instructed Campioni to engage one of the two forces facing him but they had planned to keep the action close to Italy and were deliberately moving north to draw the British closer to their airbases. By 14:00 Cunningham had cut off the Italian fleet from Taranto.

The British cruiser group was spread out in front of Warspite and at 15:15 they caught sight of the Italian main battle force. The two groups opened fire at 70,500 ft (21,500 m). Italian range finding was better than the British and within three minutes they had found the distance even though they were firing at extreme range. Although British range finding was not as good and they had trouble with their rounds falling short, British gun laying was better and they were able to place their rounds in much tighter groups. Generally the gunnery of the two forces was fairly well matched. After only a few minutes the range was down to 66,000 ft (20,000 m) and British gunnery improved. By 15:22, the Italian fire came dangerously close to the British cruisers and Vice Admiral John Tovey decided to disengage. At this point splinters from a 6 in (152 mm) shell fired by the cruiser Giuseppe Garibaldi hit HMS Neptune, damaging her catapult and the Fairey Seafox reconnaissance aircraft beyond repair. The cruisers continued to open the range and by 15:30 fire ceased.

One group of Italian light cruisers, mistaken for the heavy cruisers of the Zara class, was on the British side of the battle line and was soon within range of Warspite. Once again the British fire fell short and neither target, Alberico da Barbiano and Alberto di Giussano, were hit in the initial salvos. By this time Warspite was also out of position and circled to allow Malaya to catch up. Royal Sovereign was still well to the rear. The Italian commander decided to take on Warspite, and started moving his two battleships into position. At 15:52 Giulio Cesare opened fire at a range of 86,600 ft (26,400 m). Conte di Cavour held her fire, as Italian doctrine was for battleships to fight one-on-one. It had been discovered during the Battle of Jutland that more than one ship firing at a single target made it very difficult to identify the fall of shot. Conte di Cavour had been assigned to Malaya and Royal Sovereign, which did not enter the engagement.

Warspite, not aware of the Italian firing patterns, split her guns between the two ships. During the exchange one of Giulio Cesare's rounds fell long and caused splinter damage to Warspite's escorting destroyers Hereward and Decoy, which had formed up on the far side of the action. At 15:54 Malaya opened fire, well out of range, hoping to cause some confusion on the Italian ships. The Italian heavy cruisers came into action and started firing on Warspite at 15:55 but had to break off as the British cruisers returned.

At 15:59 two shells from Giulio Cesare fell very close to Warspite, then one of Warspite's 15 in (381 mm) rounds hit the rear deck of Giulio Cesare, exploding in the funnel, and setting off the stored ammunition for one of her 37 mm (1.5 in) anti-aircraft guns. Two seamen were killed and several wounded. The fumes from the burning ammunition were sucked down into the engine room, which had to evacuate and shut down half of the boilers. Giulio Cesare's speed quickly fell off to 18 kn (33 km/h; 21 mph) and Conte di Cavour took over. Giulio Cesare and Warspite were well over 79,000 feet (24,000 m) apart and the hit was one of the longest-range naval gunfire successes in history. (Note: The German battleship Scharnhorst had achieved a hit on the British aircraft carrier HMS Glorious at approximately the same range the previous month.)

It would appear that Warspite was in an excellent position to deal some serious blows to the slowing Giulio Cesare but she once again executed a tight turn to allow Malaya to catch up. With her guns suddenly silenced during the turn, rangefinders on Malaya discovered what the Italians had been intending to avoid, that her rounds were falling 2,700 yd (2,500 m) short of Giulio Cesare. At 16:01 the Italian destroyers generated smoke and the battleships got under cover.

==== Evening ====
At 15:58 Fiume re-opened fire on her counterpart in the British line, Liverpool and soon two groups of Italian cruisers (Zara, Bolzano and Pola, closely followed by Gorizia and Trento) came into range with the main British cruiser group. Firing continued as both groups attempted to form up and at 16:07 Bolzano was hit three times by 6-inch shells from Neptune, temporarily locking her rudder and causing two fatalities in the torpedo room. A near miss on the destroyer Vittorio Alfieri caused minor damage. Two of the four damaged boilers in Giulio Cesare were repaired, allowing the battleship to reach 22 kn (41 km/h; 25 mph). Admiral Campioni, considering the possibility of his remaining battleship, Conte di Cavour, having to face three enemy battleships and an aircraft carrier, decided to withdraw the battleships towards Messina.

Over the next hour both fleets made long-range torpedo runs with their destroyers, without success. At 16:40, Italian aircraft made an attack with 126 aircraft, reporting damage on Eagle, Warspite and Malaya; because of a misunderstanding, fifty of the Italian aircraft attacked the Italian ships for six hours, without damage. The battle ended at 16:50 with both sides withdrawing. The destroyer Leone Pancaldo, sent to Augusta in Sicily, was hit by a torpedo launched from a Swordfish at 09:40 the next day and sank in shallow water. She was refloated and returned to service in December 1941.

== Aftermath ==
=== Analysis ===
After the battle both fleets turned for home. This allowed the Italians to claim a victory of sorts, as their cargo ships were already past the action by this time and sailed safely for Libya. The British ships also reached Alexandria along with their escort. Although the battle was indecisive, British sources claimed that the Royal Navy asserted an important "moral ascendancy" over their Italian counterpart.

Other sources dispute those claims, pointing out that, in the aftermath of the battle, the moods of the two commanders were quite different. Campioni wrote that, even having been able to employ only two old refurbished battleships, the battle gave to every man in the fleet, from the senior officers to the seamen, the impression of being able to cope with the British on equal terms. Cunningham was dismayed by the performance of his two older units, whose lack of speed permitted the Italians to dictate the course of the action and whose guns were out-ranged by those of the two Italian battleships and those of the heavy cruisers. Cunningham dismissed the Royal Sovereign as a "constant source of anxiety", and asked the Admiralty for two or three more Queen Elizabeth-class battleships, possibly equipped with radar, a new carrier with an armoured deck, the heavy cruisers York and Exeter and enough smaller ships to cover the major units.

The Italian Littorio class battleships Littorio and Vittorio Veneto at Taranto, both almost ready for action were only a few hours from the scene. The ships were still undergoing trials, and Littorio had suffered an electrical fault on one of her main turrets. The battleships would have tipped the balance of firepower well onto the Italian side. Even without these ships the fleets were fairly even. Despite Italian superiority in aircraft, due to the nearby land-based aircraft of the Regia Aeronautica, the attacks proved ineffective, achieving little apart from the damage to Gloucester. Despite this, the battle reports of the airmen were exaggerated to the point of claiming damage to half of the British fleet. British gunnery proved superior, while the Italian salvos were too widely dispersed due to technical reasons.

== Royal Navy order of battle ==
=== Mediterranean Fleet ===
Mediterranean Fleet
Ship	Flag	Type	Notes
Force A, Vice-Admiral John Tovey
7th Cruiser Squadron
HMS Orion	Royal Navy	Leander-class cruiser	Flag, escorted Convoy MF 1 from 12 July
HMS Neptune	Royal Navy	Leander-class cruiser	Damaged, escorted Convoy MF 1 from 12 July
HMAS Sydney	Royal Navy	Leander-class cruiser	12 July, joined Warspite
HMS Gloucester	Royal Navy	Town-class cruiser	Damaged
HMS Liverpool	Royal Navy	Town-class cruiser	12 July, joined Warspite
Force B, Admiral (acting rank) Andrew Cunningham, C-in-C Mediterranean Fleet
HMS Warspite	Royal Navy	Queen Elizabeth-class battleship	Flag
HMS Mohawk	Royal Navy	Tribal-class destroyer	
HMS Nubian	Royal Navy	Tribal-class destroyer	
HMS Decoy	Royal Navy	D-class destroyer	Damaged
HMS Havock	Royal Navy	H-class destroyer	Joined Convoy MF 1, 11 July
HMS Hereward	Royal Navy	H-class destroyer	Damaged
HMS Hero	Royal Navy	H-class destroyer	Joined Convoy MF 1, 11 July
HMAS Stuart	Royal Navy	Scott-class destroyer	Joined Convoy MF 1, 11 July
Force C, Vice-Admiral Sir Henry Pridham-Wippell
1st Battle Squadron
HMS Malaya	Royal Navy	Queen Elizabeth-class battleship	11 July, escorted Convoy MS 1
HMS Royal Sovereign	Royal Navy	Revenge-class battleship	Flag, 11 July, escorted Convoy MS 1
HMS Eagle	Royal Navy	Aircraft carrier	11 July, escorted Convoy MS 1
HMS Dainty	Royal Navy	D-class destroyer	11 July, escorted Convoy MS 1
HMS Defender	Royal Navy	D-class destroyer	11 July, escorted Convoy MS 1
HMS Hasty	Royal Navy	H-class destroyer	11 July, escorted Convoy MS 1
HMS Hostile	Royal Navy	H-class destroyer	11 July, escorted Convoy MS 1
HMS Hyperion	Royal Navy	H-class destroyer	11 July, escorted Convoy MS 1
HMS Ilex	Royal Navy	I-class destroyer	11 July, escorted Convoy MS 1
HMS Janus	Royal Navy	J-class destroyer	11 July, escorted Convoy MS 1
HMS Juno	Royal Navy	J-class destroyer	11 July, escorted Convoy MS 1
HMAS Vampire	Royal Navy	V-class destroyer	11 July, escorted Convoy MS 1
HMAS Voyager	Royal Navy	V-class destroyer	11 July, escorted Convoy MS 1

=== Fleet Air Arm ===
Embarked on HMS Eagle
Squadron	Flag	Type	Role	Notes
813 Naval Air Squadron	Royal Navy	Swordfish	Torpedo-Spotter-Reconnaissance	Spotted for the fleet
813 Naval Air Squadron	Royal Navy	Sea Gladiator	Fighter	3 aircraft, flown by volunteers
824 Naval Air Squadron	Royal Navy	Swordfish	Torpedo-Spotter-Reconnaissance	Made two torpedo attacks on Italian Fleet

=== Convoy MF 1 ===
Malta to Alexandria (fast) 9–11 July
Ship	Year	Flag	GRT	Notes
SS El Nil	1916	Merchant Navy	7,769	
SS Knight of Malta	1929	Egypt	1,553	
SS Rodi	1928	Merchant Navy	3,220	Ex-Italian ship

=== Convoy MS 1 ===
Malta to Alexandria (slow) 10–14 July
Ship	Year	Flag	GRT	Notes
SS Kirkland	1934	Merchant Navy	1,934	
SS Masirah	1919	Merchant Navy	6,578	
SS Novasli	1920	Norway	3,204	
SS Tweed	1926	Merchant Navy	2,697	
SS Zeeland	1928	Merchant Navy	8,281	

=== Convoy escorts, Malta to Alexandria ===
Escorts for Convoy MF 1
Ship	Flag	Type	Notes
HMS Diamond	Royal Navy	D-class destroyer	9–14 July
HMS Jervis	Royal Navy	J-class destroyer	9–14 July
HMAS Vendetta	Royal Navy	V-class destroyer	9–14 July
HMS Havock	Royal Navy	H-class destroyer	Joined convoy, 11 July
HMS Hero	Royal Navy	H-class destroyer	Joined convoy, 11 July
HMAS Stuart	Royal Navy	Scott-class destroyer	Joined convoy, 11 July

== Regia Marina order of battle ==
=== Battlefleets ===
1st Fleet and 2nd Fleet
Ship	Flag	Type	Notes
1st Fleet, Squadron Admiral Inigo Campioni
5th Battleship Division, Divisional Admiral Bruto Brivonesi
Conte di Cavour	Kingdom of Italy	Cavour-class battleship	Flag
Giulio Cesare	Kingdom of Italy	Cavour-class battleship	Flag, Inigo Campioni, damaged
4th (Light) Cruiser Division, Divisional Admiral Alberto Marenco di Moriondo
Alberico da Barbiano	Kingdom of Italy	Giussano-class cruiser	Flag
Alberto di Giussano	Kingdom of Italy	Giussano-class cruiser	
Luigi Cadorna	Kingdom of Italy	Condottieri-class cruiser	
Armando Diaz	Kingdom of Italy	Condottieri-class cruiser	
8th (Light) Cruiser Division, Divisional Admiral Antonio Legnani
Abruzzi	Kingdom of Italy	Condottieri-class cruiser	Flag
Giuseppe Garibaldi	Kingdom of Italy	Condottieri-class cruiser	
7th Destroyer Squadron, Capitano di fregata [Commander] Amleto Baldo
Freccia	Kingdom of Italy	Freccia-class destroyer	Flag
Saetta	Kingdom of Italy	Freccia-class destroyer	
Dardo	Kingdom of Italy	Freccia-class destroyer	
Strale	Kingdom of Italy	Freccia-class destroyer	
8th Destroyer Squadron, Capitano di fregata Luigi Liannazza
Folgore	Kingdom of Italy	Folgore-class destroyer	Flag
Fulmine	Kingdom of Italy	Folgore-class destroyer	
Baleno	Kingdom of Italy	Folgore-class destroyer	
Lampo	Kingdom of Italy	Folgore-class destroyer	
15th Destroyer Squadron, Capitano di vascello [Captain] Paolo Melodia
Antonio Pigafetta	Kingdom of Italy	Navigatori-class destroyer	Flag
Nicolò Zeno	Kingdom of Italy	Navigatori-class destroyer	
16th Destroyer Squadron, Capitano di vascello Ugo Salvadori
Nicoloso da Recco	Kingdom of Italy	Navigatori-class destroyer	Flag
Antoniotto Usodimare	Kingdom of Italy	Navigatori-class destroyer	
Emanuele Pessagno	Kingdom of Italy	Navigatori-class destroyer	
14th Destroyer Squadron, Capitano di vascello Giovanni Galati
Ugolino Vivaldi	Kingdom of Italy	Navigatori-class destroyer	Flag
Leone Pancaldo	Kingdom of Italy	Navigatori-class destroyer	
Antonio da Noli	Kingdom of Italy	Navigatori-class destroyer	
2nd Fleet, Squadron Admiral Riccardo Paladini
1st (Heavy) Cruiser Division, Divisional Admiral Pellegrino Matteucci
Fiume	Kingdom of Italy	Zara-class cruiser	
Gorizia	Kingdom of Italy	Zara-class cruiser	
Pola	Kingdom of Italy	Zara-class cruiser	Flag, Riccardo Paladini
Zara	Kingdom of Italy	Zara-class cruiser	Flag
3rd (Heavy) Cruiser Division, Divisional Admiral Carlo Cattaneo
Bolzano	Kingdom of Italy	Heavy cruiser	Damaged
Trento	Kingdom of Italy	Trento-class cruiser	Flag
7th (Light) Cruiser Division, Divisional Admiral Luigi Sansonetti
Eugenio di Savoia	Kingdom of Italy	Condottieri-class cruiser	Flag
Duca d'Aosta	Kingdom of Italy	Condottieri-class cruiser	
Muzio Attendolo	Kingdom of Italy	Condottieri-class cruiser	
Raimondo Montecuccoli	Kingdom of Italy	Condottieri-class cruiser	
9th Destroyer Squadron Capitano di vascello [Captain] Lorenzo Daretti
Vittorio Alfieri	Kingdom of Italy	Oriani-class destroyer	Flag, damaged
Alfredo Oriani	Kingdom of Italy	Oriani-class destroyer	
Giosuè Carducci	Kingdom of Italy	Oriani-class destroyer	
Vincenzo Gioberti	Kingdom of Italy	Oriani-class destroyer	
11th Destroyer Squadron, Capitano di vascello Carlo Margottini
Artigliere	Kingdom of Italy	Soldati-class destroyer	Flag
Camicia Nera	Kingdom of Italy	Soldati-class destroyer	
Aviere	Kingdom of Italy	Soldati-class destroyer	
Geniere	Kingdom of Italy	Soldati-class destroyer	
12th Destroyer Squadron, Capitano di vascello Carmine D'Arienzo
Lanciere	Kingdom of Italy	Soldati-class destroyer	Flag
Carabiniere	Kingdom of Italy	Soldati-class destroyer	
Corazziere	Kingdom of Italy	Soldati-class destroyer	
Ascari	Kingdom of Italy	Soldati-class destroyer	

=== Convoy TCM ===
Naples to Benghazi
Ship	Year	Flag	GRT	Notes
SS Esperia	1920	Merchant Navy	11,398	6–8 July, Naples to Benghazi
MV Calitea	1933	Merchant Navy	4,023	6–8 July, Naples to Benghazi
MV Marco Foscarini	1940	Merchant Navy	6,342	6–8 July, Naples to Benghazi
MV Vettor Pisani	1939	Merchant Navy	6,339	6–8 July, Naples to Benghazi
MV Francesco Barbaro	1940	Merchant Navy	6,430	7–8 July, Catania to Benghazi

=== Convoy escorts ===
Convoy TCM close escort
Ship	Flag	Type	Notes
2nd (Light) Cruiser Division, Divisional Admiral Ferdinando Casardi
Giovanni delle Bande Nere	Kingdom of Italy	Giussano-class cruiser	Flag
Bartolomeo Colleoni	Kingdom of Italy	Giussano-class cruiser	
10th Destroyer Squadron, Capitano di vascello Franco Garofalo
Grecale	Kingdom of Italy	Maestrale-class destroyer	
Libeccio	Kingdom of Italy	Maestrale-class destroyer	
Maestrale	Kingdom of Italy	Maestrale-class destroyer	
Scirocco	Kingdom of Italy	Maestrale-class destroyer	
5th Torpedo Boat Squadron
Giuseppe Cesare Abba	Kingdom of Italy	Rosolino Pilo-class destroyer	
6th Torpedo Boat Squadron
Rosolino Pilo	Kingdom of Italy	Rosolino Pilo-class destroyer	
14th Torpedo Boat Squadron
Pegaso	Kingdom of Italy	Orsa-class torpedo boat	
Procione	Kingdom of Italy	Orsa-class torpedo boat	
Orione	Kingdom of Italy	Orsa-class torpedo boat	
Orsa	Kingdom of Italy	Orsa-class torpedo boat	

=== Regia Marina ships ===
Number of Italian ships
Base	Battleships	8-inch cruisers	6-inch cruisers	Destroyers	Total
Naples	—	—	—	4	4
Catania	—	—	—	2	2
Augusta	—	4	2	12	18
Messina	—	2	—	4	6
Palermo	—	—	4	4	8
Taranto	2	—	6	16	24
Total	2	6	12	42	62

=== Regia Aeronautica ===
Key
Name	Type	English
Stormo	—	Usually two Gruppi of the same aircraft type
Gruppo	—	Two Squadriglie of multi-engined machines, three Squadriglie of single-engined aircraft
Squadra Aerea	—	Area command reporting to Comando Supremo in Rome
Autonomo	Aut.	Independent Gruppi and Squadriglie under Squadra command
Caccia Terrestre	C.T.	Land fighters
Caccia Marittima	C.M.	Maritime fighters
Bombardamento Terrestre	B.T.	Land bombers
Bombardamento Marittima	B.M.	Floatplanes
Bombardamento a Tuffo	B.a.T.	Dive bombers
Ricognizioni Marittima	R.M.	Reconnaissance floatplanes
Ricognizione Strategica Terrestre	R.S.T.	Str R, Land Strategic Reconnaissance
Observazioni Aerea	O.A.	Tac R, Land Tactical Reconnaissance
Aerosiluranti	A.S./Sil	Torpedo bomber

==== Sicily ====
2a Squadra Aerea, Aeronautica Sicila, 10 June 1940
Gruppo	Squadriglie	Type	No.	Role	Base	Notes
1° Div Aerea C.T. "Aquila" (Palermo)
1° Stormo C.T.
17°	71a, 72a, 80a	Fiat CR.32	26	Fighter	Palermo	
157°	384a, 385a, 386a	Fiat CR.32	17	Fighter	Trapani	
6°	79a, 81a, 88a	Macchi C.200	26	Fighter	Catania	
3a Div Aerea B.T. "Centauro" (Catania)
11° Stormo B.T.
33°, 34°	59a, 60a, 67a, 68a	SM.79	33	Bomber	Catania	
34° Stormo B.T.
52°, 53°	214a, 215a, 216a, 217a	SM.79	27	Bomber	Catania	
41° Stormo B.T.
59°, 60°	232a, 233a, 234a, 235a	SM.79	18 (33)	Bomber	Gela (Note: Detached to Bresso, re-joined 41° Stormo 30 June with 15 SM.79s.)	
11a Div Aerea B.T. "Nibbio" (Castelvetrano)
30° Stormo B.T.
87°, 90°	192a, 193a, 194a, 195a	SM.79	27	Bomber	Castelvetrano	
36° Stormo B.T.
108°, 109°	256a, 257a, 258a, 259a	SM.79	32	Bomber	Castelvetrano	
96° Gruppo B.a.T. (Pantellaria)
96°	236a, 237a	SM.85	4	Dive-Bomber	Pantelleria	
83° Gruppo R.S.T.
83°	184a, 186a, 189a	Z.501	21	Str R	Augusta	
83°	143a	Z.501	6	Str R	Melenas	
83°	144a	Z.501	6	Str R	Marsala	
83°	170a	Z.506B	7	Str R	Augusta	
83°	Sezione	Z.506B	3	Str R	Marsala-Stagnone	Idro (float plane)
76° Gruppo Auton.O.A.
76°	30a	Ro.37	6	Tac R	Palermo-Boccadifalco	

==== Sardinia ====
Aeronautica Sardegna 2a Squadra Aerea, 10 June 1940
Gruppo	Squadriglie	Type	No.	Role	Base	Notes
3° Gruppo Auton C.T. (Monserrato)
3°	153a, 154a, 155a	CR.42	27	Fighter	Monserrato	
8° Stormo B.T. (Villacidro)
27°, 28°	18a, 52a, 10a, 19a	SM.79	32	Bomber	Villacidro	
31° Stormo B.M. (Villacidro)
93°, 94°	196a, 197a,198a	Z.506B	24	Bomber	Cagliari-Elmas	Floatplanes
32° Stormo B.T. (Decimomannu)
38°, 89°	49a, 50a, 228a, 229a	SM.79	30	Bomber	Decimommanu	
19° Gruppo Auton Combattimento (Alghero)
19°	100a, 101a, 102a	Ba.88	13	Attack	Alghero	
85° Gruppo Auton R.S.T. (Cagliari-Elmas)
85°	146a, 183a, 188a	Z.501	18	Str R	Alghero	
85°	148a	Z.501	6	Str R	Vigna de Valle	
85°	199a	Z.506B	7	Str R	Santa Giusta	
85°	124a	Ro.37	4	Tac R	Cagliari-Elmas	
85°	5a Sezione	Z.501	4	Str R	Olbia	Coastal reconnaissance
85°	613a Sezione	S.66	5	Rescue	Cagliari-Elmas	Idro (flying boat)

== Bibliography ==
- Giorgerini, Giorgio (1977). La battaglia dei convogli in Mediterraneo [The Battle of the Convoys in the Mediterranean]. Biblioteca del mare, 150, 23 (in Italian). Milano: Mursia. OCLC 5137647.
- Greene, Jack; Massignani, Alessandro (1998). The Naval War in the Mediterranean, 1940–1943. London: Chatham. ISBN 1-885119-61-5.
- Greene, J.; Massignani, A. (2002) [1998]. The Naval War in the Mediterranean 1940–1943 (pbk. ed.). Rochester: Chatham. ISBN 978-1-86176-190-3.
- Hague, Arnold (2000). The Allied Convoy System 1939–1945. Annapolis, MD: Naval Institute Press. ISBN 978-1-55750-019-9.
- Hill, J. R.; Ranft, Bryan (2002). The Oxford Illustrated History of the Royal Navy. Oxford: Oxford University Press. ISBN 0-19-860527-7.
- Ireland, Bernard (1993). The War in the Mediterranean 1940–1943. ISBN 978-1-84-415047-2.
- Jordan, Roger W. (2006) [1999]. The World's Merchant Fleets 1939: The Particulars and Wartime Fates of 6,000 Ships (2nd ed.). London: Chatham/Lionel Leventhal. ISBN 978-1-86176-293-1.
- Jordan, John (2008). Warship 2008. London: Conway Maritime Press. ISBN 1-84486-062-0.
- Knox, MacGregor (1986). Mussolini Unleashed, 1939–1941: Politics and Strategy in Fascist Italy's Last War. Cambridge: Cambridge University Press. ISBN 0-521-33835-2.
- Lloyd's Register of Shipping (Lloyd's Register Foundation, Heritage & Education Centre ed.). London: Lloyd's Register of Shipping. 1940. OCLC 829447760.
- O'Hara, Vincent P. (2009). Struggle for the Middle Sea: The Great Navies at War in the Mediterranean Theater, 1940–1945. Annapolis, MD: Naval Institute Press. ISBN 978-1-59114-648-3.
- Sadkovich, James (1990). Reevaluating Major Naval Combatants of World War II. New York: Greenwood Press. ISBN 0-313-26149-0.
- Shores, Christopher; Cull, Brian; Malizia, Nicola (1987). Malta: The Hurricane Years 1940–41. London: Grub Street. ISBN 0-948817-06-2.
- Smith, Peter C. (2011). Critical Conflict: The Royal Navy's Mediterranean Campaign in 1940. Barnsley: Pen & Sword Aviation. ISBN 978-1-84884-513-8. First published as Action Imminent: Three Studies of the Naval War in the Mediterranean Theatre during 1940 (1980) William Kimber, London. ISBN 978-0-7183-0277-1
- Whitley, M. J. (2000). Destroyers of World War Two: An International Encyclopedia. London: Arms & Armour Press. ISBN 1-85409-521-8.
- Woodman, R. (2003). Malta Convoys 1940–1943 (pbk. ed.). London: John Murray. ISBN 978-0-7195-6408-6.
- "Wrecksite". 2025. Search engine used for ships not in Jordan 2006
