= Bruto Brivonesi =

Italian admiral (1888–1979)

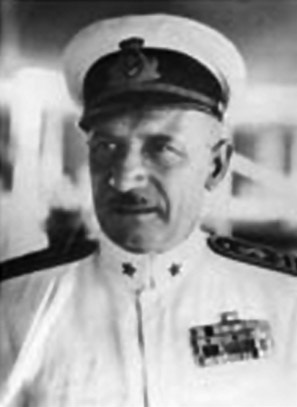
- Born: 22 November 1888; Ancona, Marche, Italy
- Died: 1 June 1979 (aged 90); Rome, Lazio, Italy
- Military career
- Allegiance: Kingdom of Italy
- Branch: Regia Marina; Italian Navy
- Service years: 1905–1951
- Rank: Ammiraglio di Squadra (Admiral)
- Commands: Rosolino Pilo (destroyer); Daniele Manin (destroyer); Insidioso (destroyer); Cristoforo Colombo (training ship); Bolzano (heavy cruiser); Italian Naval Academy; 5th Naval Division; Ionian and Southern Adriatic Naval Department; Commander-in-Chief of the Italian naval forces
- Conflicts: Italo-Turkish War; World War I; Battle of the Piave River; World War II; Battle of Calabria; Battle of Taranto; Operation Slapstick
- Awards: Silver Medal of Military Valor; Bronze Medal of Military Valor (twice); War Merit Cross (twice); Military Order of Savoy; Order of the Crown of Italy

Bruto Brivonesi (22 November 1888 – 1 June 1979) was an Italian admiral during World War II.

== Biography ==
=== Early life and career ===
Brivonesi was born in Ancona in 1888, the son of Benedetto Brivonesi and Ida Costanzi, and entered the Italian Naval Academy in Livorno in 1905, graduating as an ensign on 1 March 1909. After promotion to Sub-Lieutenant on 29 August 1911, he participated in the Italo-Turkish War aboard the battleship Sardegna. Having been promoted to lieutenant on 1 January 1915, he participated in the First World War, at first embarked on various ships, including the battleship Regina Elena, and later as artillery group commander in the Naval Brigade, fighting on the Piave river. He distinguished himself during the fighting near Cortellazzo (July 1918), and the lower Piave (October 1918), receiving two Bronze Medals of Military Valor and a War Merit Cross.

After the end of the war he commanded several torpedo boats, was promoted lieutenant commander on 1 July 1922 and became executive officer of the protected cruiser Campania. On 30 July 1926 he became commander, and in the subsequent years he was given command of the destroyers Rosolino Pilo, Daniele Manin and Insidioso. Before taking command of the training ship Cristoforo Colombo in March 1930, he held the post of Chief of Staff of the 1st Destroyer Division. He then spent a brief period in shore assignments at the Ministry of the Navy and in command of the schools of the Royal Corps of Naval Crews (Corpo Reali Equipaggi Marittimi, C.R.E.M.) at the Varignano naval base (La Spezia). On 1 November 1932 he was promoted to captain and assumed the post of Chief of Staff of the 1st Naval Squadron and then, between 1934 and 1936, he commanded the heavy cruiser Bolzano.

On 1 January 1937 he was promoted to the rank of rear admiral, and assigned to the Ministry of the Navy as a member and secretary for military affairs of the Superior Council of the Navy. In September 1938 he was given command of the Naval Academy in Livorno, a role he kept until August 1939. On 1 September 1939 he was promoted to vice admiral; in that same month he returned at the Ministry and remained there until April 1940.

=== World War II and aftermath ===
On 25 April 1940 Brivonesi was appointed commander of the 5th Naval Division, consisting of the battleships Duilio and Andrea Doria, a role he would hold till 7 November 1941. Italy entered World War II on 10 June 1940, and Brivonesi commanded the 5th Naval Division in several missions, including the Battle of Calabria; his division was also involved in the Battle of Taranto, where Duilio was torpedoed and heavily damaged. In the same period, Brivonesi also held for some months the rank of chief of staff of the 1st Fleet. After leaving the command of the 5th Division in November 1941, he was assigned to Supermarina as Inspector of the anti-submarine forces. He held this office until April 1943; on 1 January 1943 he was promoted to admiral. Between 1940 and 1942 he was also a member of the Naval Weapons Projects Committee and of the Superior Committee for the coordination of technical projects. On 10 April 1943 Brivonesi was given command of the Ionian and Southern Adriatic Naval Department, with headquarters in Taranto.

On 7 September 1943 Brivonesi participated in a meeting held at the General Staff of the Navy in Rome, in the presence of the Chief of Staff Raffaele de Courten, where he was informed of the imminent proclamation of the armistice with the Allies. When the armistice of Cassibile was announced, on 8 September 1943, Brivonesi ensured that all units and commands under his jurisdiction would comply with the terms of the armistice; when Admiral Giovanni Galati refused to hand over his ships to the Allies, Brivonesi placed him under arrest. At the same time, however, Brivonesi allowed two German E-Boats and an MFP to retrieve a load of German mines, leave Taranto unopposed and sail north. The German vessels immediately laid their mines in the Taranto roads (causing the loss of minelayer HMS Abdiel, a British minesweeper and an Italian tug) and later sank the Italian destroyer Quintino Sella and the Italian gunboat Aurora on their way north, and captured six Italian merchants before reaching Venice.

During the co-belligerence and immediately after the war, Brivonesi held successively the positions of Deputy Chief of Staff of the Navy, General Secretary of the Navy, Inspector of Naval Forces from 1 October 1946 to 4 April 1947, and Commander-in-chief of the Italian naval forces from 5 April 1947 to 18 December 1948 He finally left active service in September 1951, and he was president of the Naval League from 25 July 1950 to 31 January 1960. He died in Rome on 1 June 1979.
