= Italian cruiser Armando Diaz =

1932 Cadorna-class cruiser

Coordinates: 34°33′N 11°45′E

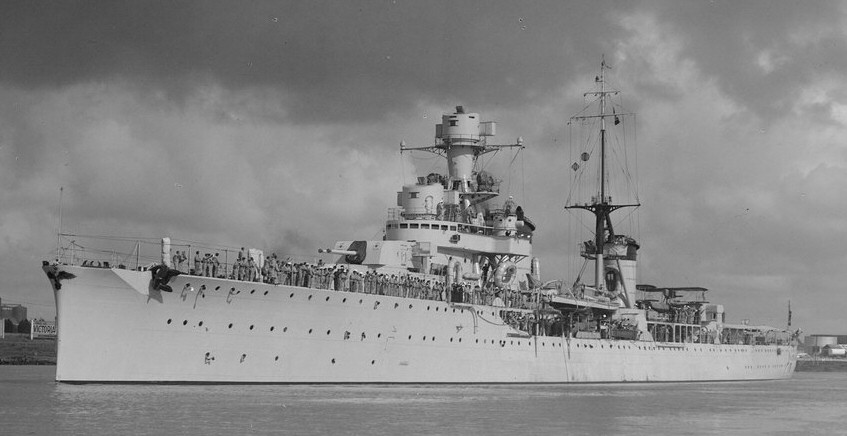

History

Italy
- Name: Armando Diaz
- Ordered: 29 October 1929
- Builder: O.T.O., La Spezia
- Laid down: 28 July 1930
- Launched: 10 July 1932
- Commissioned: 29 April 1933
- Fate: Sunk, 25 February 1941

General characteristics
- Class & type: Condottieri-class cruiser
- Displacement: 5,406 t (5,321 long tons) standard; 7,194 t (7,080 long tons) full load
- Length: 169.3 m (555 ft 5 in)
- Beam: 15.5 m (50 ft 10 in)
- Draught: 5.2 m (17 ft 1 in)
- Propulsion: 2 Parsons geared turbines; 6 Yarrow boilers; 95,000 hp (70,841 kW)
- Speed: 36.5 knots (67.6 km/h; 42.0 mph)
- Range: 3,088 nmi (5,719 km) at 16 kn (18 mph; 30 km/h)
- Complement: 507
- Armament: 8 × 152 mm (6 in) /53 guns (4×2); 6 × 100 mm (4 in) / 47 caliber guns (3×2); 2 × Vickers-Terni 40 mm/39 guns (2×1); 8 × 13.2 mm guns (4×2)
- Armour: Deck: 20 mm (0.79 in); Main belt: 24 mm (0.94 in); Turrets: 23 mm (0.91 in)
- Aircraft carried: 2 aircraft
- Aviation facilities: 1 catapult

Armando Diaz was a light cruiser of the Condottieri class and the sister-ship of the Luigi Cadorna. She served in the Regia Marina during World War II. She was built by OTO, La Spezia, and named after Armando Diaz, an Italian Field Marshal of World War I.

She was launched on 29 April 1933 and served in the Mediterranean after her completion. From 1 September 1934 until February 1935 she made a cruise to Australia and New Zealand.

During the Spanish Civil War she served in the western Mediterranean and was based at Palma de Mallorca and Melilla.

In July 1940, she was present at the Battle of Calabria, also called the battle of Punta Stilo. In October she took part in a mission to Albania, and in December she came under direct orders of Supermarina (Naval Headquarters) for special duties in connection with the protection of traffic to Albania from January 1941. However, the following month an important supply convoy to Tripoli required her use for cover, in company with the light cruiser Giovanni dalle Bande Nere and some destroyers.

In the course of this operation the ship was torpedoed and sunk by the British submarine HMS Upright off the Kerkennah Islands in the early hours of 25 February. It took the Italian cruiser only six minutes to sink after her magazine detonated, with the loss of 484 men.

== Wreck ==
The wreck of Armando Diaz was located around 2009–2010. The ship lies on her port side in less than 50 meters of water, with her bow blown off. Her aft turrets are still in place, their guns buried in the bottom.
