= Manlio Tarantini =

Italian admiral

- Born: 31 August 1887; Jesi, Kingdom of Italy
- Died: 17 October 1963 (aged 76); Rome, Italy
- Military career
- Allegiance: Kingdom of Italy
- Branch: Regia Marina
- Rank: Admiral
- Commands: F 13 (submarine); Giovanni delle Bande Nere (light cruiser); Muzio Attendolo; Arsenal of Taranto; Southern Adriatic Naval Command; Naval Sector Albania
- Conflicts: Italo-Turkish War; World War I; Spanish Civil War; World War II; Operation Achse
- Awards: Silver Medal of Military Valor; War Merit Cross (twice); Military Order of Italy; Order of the Crown of Italy; Order of Saints Maurice and Lazarus

Manlio Tarantini (31 August 1887 – 17 October 1963) was an Italian admiral during World War II.

== Biography ==
Born in Jesi on 31 August 1887, he entered the Naval Academy of Livorno in 1903 and graduated in 1906 with the rank of ensign, initially assigned on the battleship Re Umberto and then, after promotion to sub-lieutenant, on the protected cruiser Calabria, participating in a circumnavigation of the globe from 1909 to 1911. In 1911-1912 he participated in the Italo-Turkish War aboard the protected cruiser Etna; in 1914, after being promoted to lieutenant, he was assigned on the battleship Ammiraglio di Saint Bon until 1916, when he was transferred to the submarine branch. From 1917 to 1920 he was in command of submarine F 13, obtaining a Silver Medal of Military Valor for his activity with this boat during the First World War. In 1919, after the end of the war, he was tasked with bringing to Italy the German submarine U 114, surrendered to Italy under the provisions of the Treaty of Versailles.

In 1921 he was promoted to lieutenant commander and in 1926 to commander, commanding squadrons of torpedo boats and submarines and serving at the Ministry of the Navy and the Institute of Maritime Warfare. In 1925 he married Maria Marschizek, with whom he had three children (Manfredi, born in 1925, Anna Maria, born in 1927, and Alberto, born in 1929 and himself an admiral). In 1932 he was promoted to captain and appointed commander of the defense of the Pola naval base as well as chief of staff of the local Maritime Military Command; he then commanded the CREM school of San Bartolomeo in La Spezia and from 1934 to 1936 the light cruisers Giovanni delle Bande Nere and Muzio Attendolo, being sent to Spain while in command of the latter to protect Italian citizens after the outbreak of the Spanish Civil War.

In 1939 he was promoted to rear admiral and on the following year, at the entrance of Italy into the Second World War, he was commander of the Arsenal of Taranto. Later, after being promoted to vice admiral, he was given command of the Southern Adriatic Naval Command, with headquarters in Brindisi. In March 1943 he assumed command of the Naval Sector of Albania, based in Durrës. After the armistice of Cassibile, he led the resistance of the naval personnel against German attempts to seize the port of Durrës; he was however forced to surrender by the inaction of the Army units stationed around the city, which had received orders to lay down their arms from their commands. He then refused any proposal of collaboration with the Germans and was deported to Oflag 64/Z in Schokken, Poland, participating in January 1945 in the death march that followed the evacuation of the camp, in which six generals were shot. He was then freed with his fellow prisoners by the troops of the advancing Red Army, and transferred to Liubotyn in Ukraine, returning to Italy after the end of the war, in October 1945.

He was then placed at the disposal of the Cabinet of the Minister of the Navy for special assignments, presiding over the CEMM subcommittees of the Discrimination Commissions for personnel who had collaborated with the Italian Social Republic and the German occupiers. He was transferred to the auxiliary roll in 1947 and to the reserve in 1955, being promoted to admiral in 1956. He died in Rome, where he had spent his last years with his family, in 1963.
