= Italian cruiser Muzio Attendolo =

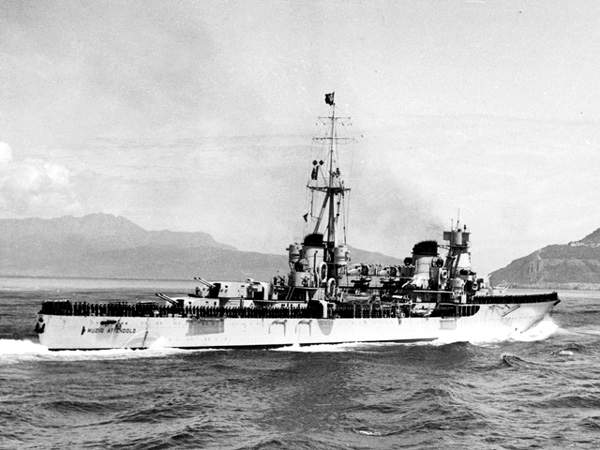
- Italian light cruiser Muzio Attendolo

History

Italy
- Name: Muzio Attendolo
- Namesake: Muzio Attendolo
- Builder: C.R.D.A., Trieste
- Laid down: 10 April 1931
- Launched: 9 September 1934
- Commissioned: 7 August 1935
- Fate: Sunk 4 December 1942

General characteristics
- Class & type: Condottieri-class light cruiser
- Displacement: 7,523 tonnes standard; 8,994 tonnes full load
- Length: 182.2 m (597 ft 9.2 in)
- Beam: 16.6 m (54 ft 5.5 in)
- Draught: 5.6 m (18 ft 4.5 in)
- Propulsion: 2 shaft Belluzzo geared turbines; 6 Yarrow boilers; 106,000 hp (79,000 kW)
- Speed: 37 knots (69 km/h)
- Range: 4,122 nautical miles (7,634 km) at 18 knots (33 km/h)
- Complement: 578 men
- Armament: 8 × 152 mm (6 in) /53 guns (4 × 2); 6 × 100 mm (4 in) / 47 caliber guns (3 × 2); 8 × 37 mm (1.5 in) 54-cal. guns (4 x 2); 8 × 13.2 mm guns (4 × 2); 4 × 21-inch (533 mm) torpedo tubes (2x2)
- Armour: Deck: 30 mm (1.2 in); Main belt: 60 mm (2.4 in); Turrets: 70 mm (2.8 in); Conning tower: 100 mm (3.9 in)
- Aircraft carried: 2 aircraft
- Aviation facilities: 1 catapult

Muzio Attendolo was a Condottieri-class light cruiser of the Italian Regia Marina which fought in World War II. She was sunk in Naples by bombers of the United States Army Air Forces (USAAF) on 4 December 1942. Although salvaged after the war, she was damaged beyond repair and was scrapped.

== Design ==
Muzio Attendolo was part of the Raimondo Montecuccoli sub-class, which were the third group of Condottieri-class light cruisers. They were larger and better protected than their predecessors.

She was built by CRDA Trieste and named after Muzio Attendolo, a 14th-century ruler of Milan and founder of the Sforza dynasty.

== Career ==
Muzio Attendolo after being torpedoed by submarine HMS Unbroken

Completed in 1935, this ship served in the Mediterranean. In 1936, under the command of Captain Manlio Tarantini, she was sent to Spain to protect Italian citizens following the outbreak of the Spanish Civil War.

During World War II she served in the following actions:

- Battle of Punto Stilo
- Operation Halberd

At the inconclusive First Battle of Sirte, which came about as a British attempt to intercept the resupply of Benghazi, Attendolo was part of the "Close covering force" for Convoy M42.

Sent as part of the planned Italian attack on the British Operation Pedestal in August 1942, the Italian cruiser division which was denied air cover by the Germans was instead withdrawn. Passing through the patrol area of two British submarines, Muzio Attendolo was torpedoed by HMS Unbroken in the early morning of 13 August. She lost all the hull forward the first turret, but the transversal bulkhead resisted enough to save her from flooding, and the loss of the damaged part lightened the ship herself. She was towed to Messina and Naples and mostly repaired within 3 months. The cruiser Bolzano, also torpedoed by Unbroken at the same time, had been struck amidships and was not repaired due to a lack of resources.

== St. Barbara’s Day bombing ==
Muzio Attendolo was at least theoretically part of the 7th Naval division, together with two other Condottieri-cruisers, Eugenio di Savoia and Raimondo Montecuccoli. But the real formidable deterrent was the 1st Squadron, with all three Littorio-class battleships. All this could have been effective with classical naval warfare, but airpower soon changed things drastically, as shown in the Battle of Taranto and Naples port attacks (1940–41).

In late December, Consolidated B-24 Liberator heavy bombers increased their activity over Naples which had become the Italians' most important naval base. Taranto had become too dangerous to harbour major ships, but Naples was still within the range of American Liberator and British Vickers Wellington bombers. On 4 December 1942 (St. Barbara's Day), 20 USAAF B-24s of 98th and 376th Bombardment Groups, based in Egypt and armed with 500 and 1000 lb bombs from 6,200 m (20,300 ft), flew to Naples unnoticed. Confused with a formation of Junkers Ju 52 transports, and flying apparently from Vesuvio, they were already over the port before anti-aircraft defences opened fire at 16.40.

Coming in from the higher terrain around Vesuvio, the pilots had underestimated the time they would need to spot, identify, and target the most important enemy ships before making course corrections that would most successfully result in hitting their primary targets. Terrestrial structures and other topographic features, from this direction, also served to clutter and confuse the pilots and their bombardiers as they tried to quickly pick out the more important enemy targets in the quickly approaching harbor. The direction and added background clutter may have also served to confuse and slow down the reaction time of the anti-aircraft defense crews who likewise had little time to identify and target the incoming bombers and resulted in these batteries only opening fire once the B-24s were on top of them. The B-24 flight had hoped to find and hit Italian battleships in the harbor. However, the direction of the air-attack had put the B-24s out of position for a bombing run on them. Even though the B-24s current flight path could not be modified enough to effectively strike at the battleships, there were other important ships in the harbor that were more vulnerable, less well defended and within the bombers current flight path. Therefore, the crews of the B-24s set their sights and made their bombing runs on the cruisers of the 7th Division.

One bomb nearly missed Eugenio di Savoia, but still caused moderate damage to the aft hull, leaving 17 dead and 46 wounded. Repair work from this "near miss" was estimated to take 40 days. Raimondo Montecuccoli was hit midships by a bomb just inside the funnel. Although the funnel was reduced to a smoking crater, the armoured grating was sufficient to protect the vital machinery that lay underneath. Even though Raimondo Montecuccoli could have suffered catastrophic damage had the bomb been able to penetrate further and into more vital compartments; her crew still suffered 44 killed and 36 wounded; and the damage to her funnel and supporting structures was sufficient that she would require seven months of repair, before being returned to active duty. Muzio Attendolo was hit in the midship by one or possibly two bombs, between tower 3 and part of her superstructure, cutting off her main power, and effectively taking her out of the fight.

The B-24 raid lasted for about an hour, ending around 17:28. Of the three cruisers damaged, Muzio Attendolo had suffered the worst. The air-raid had left Muzio Attendolo with no power, damage below the waterline, flooding, and fierce fires aft. The fires had finally been extinguished when another air-raid alarm was sounded at 21:17, sending repair crews and craft scrambling for cover from the anticipated 2nd wave air-attacks. The impending 2nd air-attack would prove to be a false alarm, and the repair personnel and vessels attending Muzio Attendolo would not return to her aid until over an hour later. During that time, the crippled ship had rolled almost 180 degrees and settled to the bottom at her moorings around 22:19. It is believed that the three light cruisers suffered together at least 188 killed (the total number is unknown) and 86 wounded. One sailor was killed on Littorio, and 150 to 250 civilians died as well. Major ships were swiftly moved to La Spezia.

Attendolo was still considered repairable with 10 to 12 months estimated, but because of the precipitating events salvage operations did not begin before the Italian armistice with Allies. The ship was used as a dock with the Allied occupation; after the war's end, given that the structures of the ship were still in a good condition, it was considered the possibility of salvaging it and transforming it into an anti-aircraft cruiser (to be included in the Navy in the place of the old cruiser Luigi Cadorna), but the lack of financial means and the fear that the Allied Commission would oppose the proposal, led to Muzio Attendolo being raised and scrapped instead.

== Bibliography ==
- Brescia, Maurizio (2012). Mussolini's Navy: A Reference Guide to the Regina Marina 1930–45. Annapolis, Maryland: Naval Institute Press. ISBN 978-1-59114-544-8.
- Chesneau, Roger, ed. (1980). Conway's All The World's Fighting Ships 1922–1946. London: Conway Maritime Press. ISBN 0-85177-146-7.
- De Toro, Augusto (December 1996). "Napoli, Santabarbara 1942". Storia Militare. 39. ISSN 1122-5289. OCLC 45468517.
- Fraccaroli, Aldo (1968). Italian Warships of World War II. Shepperton, UK: Ian Allan. ISBN 0-7110-0002-6.
- Whitley, M. J. (1995). Cruisers of World War Two: An International Encyclopedia. Annapolis, Maryland: Naval Institute Press. ISBN 1-55750-141-6.
