= Riccardo Paladini =

Italian admiral

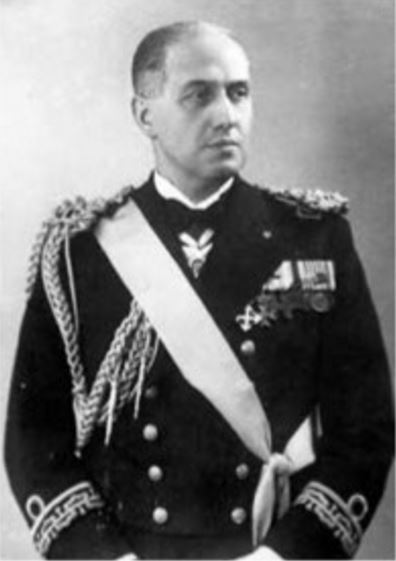
- Born: 12 September 1879; Montopoli in Val d'Arno, Tuscany, Italy
- Died: 19 March 1943 (aged 63); Livorno, Tuscany, Italy
- Military career
- Allegiance: Kingdom of Italy
- Branch: Regia Marina
- Service years: 1893–1943
- Rank: Ammiraglio d'Armata (Admiral)
- Commands: Ostro (destroyer); Euro (destroyer); Rosolino Pilo (destroyer); Naval Command Lussino; Gaeta Naval Defense; Mobile MAS Flotilla; Leone (destroyer); Antonio Da Noli (destroyer); Scout Group; Italian Naval Academy; 1st Naval Division; 3rd Naval Division; Autonomous Naval Command Sicily; Ionian Sea and Otranto Channel Naval Department; 2nd Naval Squadron
- Conflicts: Italo-Turkish War; World War I; Adriatic Campaign; World War II; Battle of Calabria
- Awards: War Cross for Military Valor; War Merit Cross; Military Order of Savoy

Riccardo Paladini (12 September 1879 – 19 March 1943) was an Italian admiral during World War II.

== Biography ==
Riccardo Paladini was born in Montopoli in Val d'Arno, in the Province of Florence in 1879 and was admitted to the Livorno Naval Academy in 1893, graduating five years later with the rank of ensign. In the following years he served on the cruiser Amerigo Vespucci, the battleship Enrico Dandolo, and in 1908–1909 on the protected cruiser Ettore Fieramosca, stationed in South America. In 1911-1912 he participated in the Italo-Turkish War with the rank of lieutenant, initially assigned on the protected cruiser Piemonte and later as executive officer of the destroyer Espero.

During World War I, Paladini initially commanded some torpedo boats; in 1917 he was promoted to lieutenant commander and commanded the destroyers Ostro, Euro and Rosolino Pilo, receiving a War Cross for Military Valor and a War Merit Cross. After the war, he became naval commander of the island of Lussino between 1919 and 1920.

After promotion to commander in 1920, in 1923–1924 Paladini served as commander of the defense of Gaeta, and in 1924–1925 he was the commanding officer of the Mobile MAS Flotilla; between 1925 and 1926 he commanded the destroyer Leone, and in 1926 he was promoted to captain. Between 1927 and 1929 he was head of the officer division at the Ministry of the Navy, then he commanded the Scout Group from 1929 to 1932, with flag on the destroyer Antonio Da Noli. He then became deputy commander of the Livorno Naval Academy; in 1933 he was promoted to Contrammiraglio (Rear Admiral) and appointed secretary of the Superior Council of the Navy.

From 1934 to 1936 Paladini was in command of the Naval Academy, and in 1935 he was promoted to Ammiraglio di Divisione (vice admiral). For a year he commanded first the 1st Naval Division and then the 3rd Naval Division (from 1 October 1936, with insignia on the heavy cruiser Trento); in 1937–1938 he was commander of the Autonomous Naval Command of Sicily and then (after promotion to Ammiraglio di Squadra, Admiral) he was commander of the Naval Department of the Ionian Sea and Otranto Channel. On 16 August 1939 he became commander of the 2nd Naval Squadron, consisting of the heavy cruisers of the 1st and 3rd Division and the light cruisers of the 7th division, with flag on the heavy cruiser Pola.

At the time of Italy's entry into World War II, 10 June 1940, Paladini still commanded the 2nd Naval Squadron, and in this role he participated, on 9 July 1940, in the Battle of Calabria. His active participation in the conflict ended abruptly after only a month and a half: on 25 July 1940 Paladini came down with angina pectoris and had to leave his command, replaced by Admiral Angelo Iachino. In September 1940 he returned to the command of the Naval Academy; during this period, in 1942, he was promoted to Ammiraglio di Squadra designato d'armata. On 12 September 1942 he was placed in auxiliary due to age limits, but he was immediately recalled to service, always as the commander of the Naval Academy; in January 1943 he was promoted to Ammiraglio d'Armata (Admiral). He suddenly died in Livorno, on 19 March 1943, of heart problems.
