= Italian cruiser Eugenio di Savoia =

Italian and Greek naval vessel (1933–1965)

- Eugenio di Savoia

History

Italy
- Name: Eugenio di Savoia
- Namesake: Prince Eugene of Savoy
- Builder: Ansaldo, Genoa
- Laid down: 6 July 1933
- Launched: 16 March 1935
- Commissioned: 16 January 1936
- Fate: Transferred to Greece, 1950

Greece
- Name: Elli
- Namesake: Battle of Elli
- Acquired: 1950
- Commissioned: June 1951
- Decommissioned: 1965
- Fate: Scrapped, 1973

General characteristics
- Class & type: Condottieri-class cruiser
- Displacement: 8,450 tons standard; 10,539 tons full load
- Length: 186.9 m (613 ft 2 in)
- Beam: 17.5 m (57 ft 5 in)
- Draught: 6.1 m (20 ft 0 in)
- Propulsion: 2 Belluzzo/Parsons geared turbines, 6 Yarrow boillers, 110,000 hp (82,000 kW)
- Speed: 36.5 knots (68 km/h)
- Range: 3,900 nautical miles (7,220 km) at 14 knots (26 km/h)
- Complement: 578
- Armament: 8 × 152 mm (6 in)/53 OTO Model 1929 naval guns (4×2); 6 × 100 mm (4 in)/47 OTO Model 1928 naval guns (3×2); 8 × 37 mm (1.5 in)/54 Breda Model 1932 AA cannons (4×2); 12 × 13.2 mm (0.52 in)/76 Breda Model 1931 AA machine guns (6×2); 6 × 21 in (533 mm) torpedo tubes (2×3)
- Armour: 35 mm deck; 70 mm main belt; 90 mm gun turrets; 100 mm conning tower
- Aircraft carried: 2
- Aviation facilities: 1 catapult

Eugenio di Savoia was a Condottieri-class light cruiser, which served in the Regia Marina during World War II. She survived the war but was given as a war reparation to the Hellenic Navy in 1950. Eugenio di Savoia was renamed Elli and served until 1965.

== Design ==
Eugenio di Savoia was part of the fourth group of Condottieri-class light cruisers, also known as the Duca d'Aosta class. The design of the Duca d'Aosta class was based on the Montecuccoli class, with a slight increase in size and a significant increase in armour. The machinery was also re-arranged.

Eugenio di Savoia was built by Ansaldo, Genoa, and named after Prince Eugene of Savoy.

== Career ==
As results of the pact between Franco and Mussolini during the Spanish Civil War, on 14 February 1937, the ship went into action off the coast of Barcelona, Spain, bombarding the city and causing 18 deaths.

The cruiser joined the 7th cruiser division and went on a circumnavigation of the globe with her sister ship in 1938-39, returning to La Spezia in March 1939. During World War II she fought in the following actions:

- Battle of Punta Stilo
- Operation Harpoon (1942) – the battle in which she crippled HMS Bedouin (F67), later finished off by a torpedo bomber.
- Operation Pedestal

She was hit during an air strike carried out by Liberator bombers while berthed in Naples on 4 December 1942. One other cruiser the Muzio Attendolo was badly hit and the later sunk. After the armistice in 1943, she was used as a training ship at Suez.

=== Greek service ===
After the end of the war, she was transferred to Greece in 1950 as war reparation. The Greek flag was raised in 1951 and the ship was renamed Elli (Έλλη). The ship became the headquarters for the Commander in Chief of the Hellenic Fleet. Although Elli did not carry a pennant number, NATO archives of the period use pennant number initially C92 and after 1962 C24. In 1959 she was moved to Souda Bay, Crete, where she was used as headquarters of the Ionian and Cretan Seas Command. She also served for state visits of King Paul to Istanbul in June 1952, Yugoslavia in September 1955, Toulon, France in June 1956, and Lebanon in May 1958. Decommissioned in 1965, she was used as a naval prison ship. Certain naval personnel were detained there during the 1967–1974 junta because of their resistance activities. She was auctioned off in 1973.
