= Italian cruiser Luigi Cadorna =

Condottieri-class light cruiser (1933–1951)

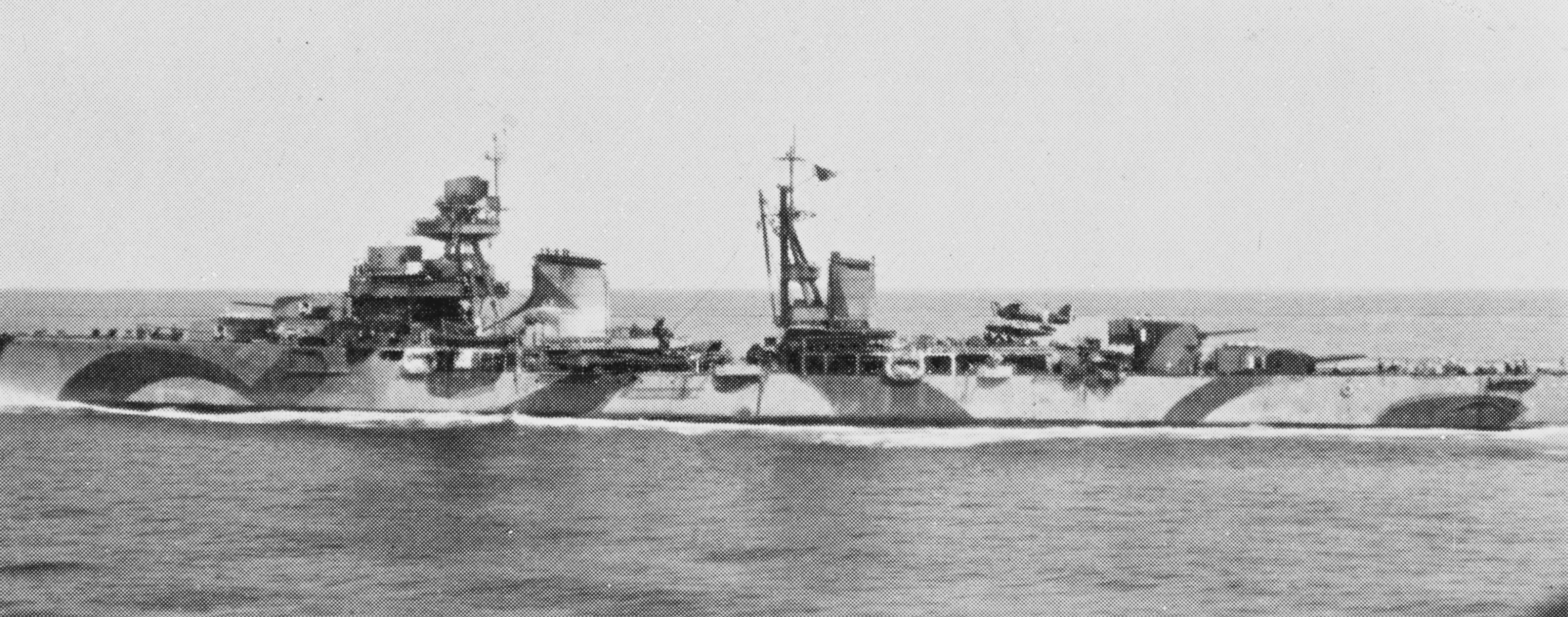
- Luigi Cadorna surrendering at Malta on 9 September 1943

History

Italy
- Name: Luigi Cadorna
- Ordered: 29 October 1929
- Builder: C.R.D.A., Trieste
- Laid down: 19 September 1930
- Launched: 30 September 1931
- Commissioned: 11 August 1933
- Stricken: May 1951
- Fate: Scrapped, 1951

General characteristics
- Class & type: Condottieri-class cruiser
- Displacement: 5,323 t (5,239 long tons) standard; 7,113 t (7,001 long tons) full load
- Length: 169.3 m (555 ft 5 in)
- Beam: 15.5 m (50 ft 10 in)
- Draught: 5.2 m (17 ft 1 in)
- Propulsion: 2 Parsons geared turbines; 6 Yarrow boilers; 95,000 hp (70,841 kW)
- Speed: 37 knots (43 mph; 69 km/h)
- Range: 2,930 nmi (5,430 km) at 16 kn (18 mph; 30 km/h)
- Complement: 507
- Armament: 8 × 152 mm (6 in) /53 guns (4×2); 6 × 100 mm (4 in) / 47 caliber guns (3×2); 2 × 37 mm (1.5 in)/54 guns (2×1); 8 × 13.2 mm guns (4×2); 4 × 533 mm (21 in) torpedo tubes
- Armour: Deck: 20 mm (0.79 in); Main belt: 24 mm (0.94 in); Turrets: 23 mm (0.91 in)
- Aircraft carried: 2 aircraft
- Aviation facilities: 1 catapult

Luigi Cadorna was an Italian Condottieri-class light cruiser, which served in the Regia Marina during World War II; named after Italian Field Marshal Luigi Cadorna who was commander in Chief of the Italian Army during World War I.

== History ==
=== Interwar Years ===
At the end of the First World War the Regia Marina’s light cruiser force, known as the Esploratori, was only made up of four obsolete vessels, with a further five that would soon join taken from the defeated German and Austro-Hungarian navies. With a newly developing arms race in the Mediterranean, the Italians sought to vastly expand the Esploratori.

In 1926 construction began on twelve ships in a new class of light cruiser. The Giussano sub-class of the Condottieri-class cruisers were designed to prioritze speed over armour, to combat the French Duguay-Trouin-class cruisers. However, the 1929 financial crises caused severe budget cuts to the Regia Marina, with only four of the planned twelve Giussano sub-class cruisers being built by 1932. Following their construction the two Cadorna sub-class cruisers were built. Whilst still prioritizing speed over armour, they did have more armour than their predecessors.

Luigi Cadorna, the first of the Cardona sub-class vessels, was launched on 30 September 1931. During her early service she participated in operations in the Spanish Civil War. In April 1939 she participated in the occupation of Albania.

=== World War II ===
When World War II broke out she was a part of the 4th Cruiser Division and started laying mines on 9 June 1940 near the island of Lampedusa. A month later she was present in the Battle of Calabria where she avoided a submarine torpedo attack, engaged enemy aircraft and assisted her sister ship Armando Diaz, which had boiler problems.

However, due to her relatively weak design and light armor, she went into reserve from 12 February 1941. The cruiser re-entered service when supplying of the Axis army in North Africa became more important. Luigi Cadorna provided distant cover for convoys headed towards North Africa. Occasionally she sortied with the fleet to intercept British convoys to Malta. In the period of November/December 1941 she was also used as a transport, transporting fuel and ammunition to Libya.

From January 1942 she was transferred to Pola, where she was employed in a training role. From April 1942 onwards she was the last of the first six Condottieri-class left in service. After a short refit in May/June 1943, she joined the 8th Cruiser Division on 14 June.

Between 24–30 June she transported troops to Albania, and on 3 July she was transferred to Taranto, from whence, in August, she made five minelaying sorties to lay defensive fields in the Gulf of Taranto along with the light cruiser Scipione Africano.

At the armistice on 8 September 1943, she was at Taranto, but she sailed to Malta, running a gauntlet of German air attacks, to surrender together with other vessels of the Italian fleet such as the Andrea Doria. She remained in Malta until transferred to Alexandria, arriving there on 16 September. After a brief stay, she returned to Taranto in October. For the remainder of the war, she was used as a transport ship for the Allies and for the repatriation of Italian troops.

=== Post-War ===
After the Peace Treaty on 10 February 1947, she was one of the few ships to remain in the Italian Navy. Because of her age and condition, she was only used as a training ship until stricken in May 1951 and subsequently scrapped.

In 1958 there was a fraudulent attempt to sell the ship for scrap. The Italian Ministry of Defence was surprised by the attempt and sought to bring fraud charges against those who attempted to sell the ship.
