= Condottieri-class cruiser =

Class of Italian light cruisers

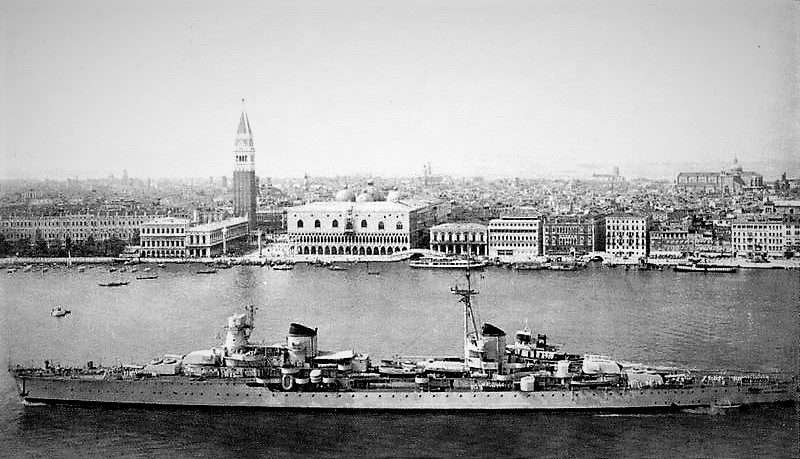
- Condottieri-class cruiser Raimondo Montecuccoli at Venice

Class overview
- Name: Condottieri class
- Builders: Cantieri Riuniti dell'Adriatico; Gio. Ansaldo & C.; Odero Terni Orlando; Livorna shipyard; Muggiano shipyard; R C di Castellammare di Stabia
- Operators: Regia Marina; Hellenic Navy; Soviet Navy
- Subclasses: Giussano class; Cadorna class; Montecuccoli class; Duca d'Aosta class; Luigi di Savoia Duca degli Abruzzi class
- Built: 1928–1937
- In commission: 1931–1971
- Planned: 14
- Completed: 12
- Canceled: 2
- Lost: 6
- Retired: 6

General characteristics
- Type: Light cruiser
- Displacement: 5,323–11,350 tonnes (5,239–11,171 long tons) standard; 7,113–11,735 tonnes (7,001–11,550 long tons) full load
- Length: 169.3–187 m (555–614 ft)
- Beam: 15.5–18.9 m (51–62 ft)
- Draught: 5.2–6.9 m (17–23 ft)
- Propulsion: 2 geared turbines; 6 boilers; 95,000–110,000 hp (71–82 MW)
- Speed: 37 kn (69 km/h; 43 mph)
- Complement: 507
- Armament: 8 152 mm (6 in)/53 cal. guns
- Aircraft carried: 2–4 × reconnaissance floatplanes

General characteristics (Luigi di Savoia Duca degli Abruzzi-class)
- Displacement: 11,350 t (11,171 long tons) standard; 11,735 t (11,550 long tons) full load
- Length: 187 m (614 ft)
- Beam: 18.9 m (62 ft)
- Draught: 6.9 m (23 ft)
- Propulsion: 2 geared turbines; 6 boilers; 110,000 hp (82 MW)
- Speed: 34 kn (63 km/h; 39 mph)
- Complement: 640
- Armament: 10 152 mm (6 in)/55 guns
- Aircraft carried: 4 × IMAM Ro.43 reconnaissance floatplanes

The Condottieri class was a sequence of five light cruiser classes of the Regia Marina (Italian Navy), although these classes show a clear line of evolution. They were built before World War II to gain predominance in the Mediterranean Sea. The ships were named after condottieri (military commanders) of Italian history.

Each class is known after the first ship of the group:

Giussano class:

- Alberto di Giussano
- Alberico da Barbiano
- Bartolomeo Colleoni
- Giovanni delle Bande Nere

Cadorna class:

- Luigi Cadorna
- Armando Diaz

Montecuccoli class:

- Raimondo Montecuccoli
- Muzio Attendolo

Duca d'Aosta class:

- Emanuele Filiberto Duca d'Aosta
- Eugenio di Savoia

Luigi di Savoia Duca degli Abruzzi class:

- Luigi di Savoia Duca degli Abruzzi
- Giuseppe Garibaldi

== Evolution ==
The first group, the four Giussanos, were built to counter the French large destroyers (contre-torpilleurs), the first being the 2,500 ton Le Fantasque-class, and therefore they featured very high speed, in exchange for virtually no armour protection.

The following two Cadornas retained the main characteristics, with minor improvements to stability and hull strength.

Major changes were introduced for the next pair, the Montecuccolis. About 2,000 tons heavier, they had significantly better protection, and upgraded power-plants to maintain the required high speed.

The two Duca d'Aostas continued the trend, thickening the armour and improving the power plant again.

The final pair, the Luigi di Savoia Duca degli Abruzzis completed the transition, sacrificing a little speed for good protection (their armour scheme was the same of the Zara-class heavy cruisers) and for two more 6-inch /55 guns.

== Service ==
All ships served in the Mediterranean during World War II.

The ships of the first two subclasses (with the exception of Luigi Cadorna) were all lost by 1942, primarily to enemy torpedoes (with Bartolomeo Colleoni sunk by destroyers at the Battle of Cape Spada after being crippled by HMAS Sydney, Alberico da Barbiano and Alberto di Giussano suffering a similar fate at in a night action of the Battle of Cape Bon, Giovanni delle Bande Nere sunk by British submarine HMS Urge, and Armando Diaz sunk by the British submarine HMS Upright) that led many authors (including Preston) to question their real value as fighting ships. The subsequent vessels fared considerably better with all surviving the war, except Muzio Attendolo (torpedoed in August 1942 and sunk by an Allied bombing in December 1942).

After the end of the war, Eugenio di Savoia and Emanuele Filiberto Duca d'Aosta were given to the Greek Navy and the Soviet Navy respectively as war reparations; Luigi Cadorna was quickly stricken, Raimondo Montecuccoli became a training ship, and the Luigi di Savoia Duca degli Abruzzi subclass served on in the Marina Militare until the 1970s, with Giuseppe Garibaldi becoming the first European guided missile cruiser in 1961.

== Ships ==
List of Condottieri-class ships
Ship	Class	Builder	Laid down	Service	
Ship	Class	Builder	Laid down	Start	End
Alberto di Giussano	Giussano class	Gio. Ansaldo & C., Sestri Ponente	29 March 1928	1 January 1931	13 December 1941
Alberico da Barbiano	Giussano class	Gio. Ansaldo & C., Sestri Ponente	16 April 1928	9 June 1931	13 December 1941
Bartolomeo Colleoni	Giussano class	Gio. Ansaldo & C., Sestri Ponente	21 June 1928	10 February 1932	19 July 1940
Giovanni delle Bande Nere	Giussano class	Regio Cantiere di Castellammare di Stabia, Castellammare di Stabia	31 October 1928	1 January 1931	1 April 1942
Luigi Cadorna	Cadorna class	Cantieri Riuniti dell'Adriatico, Trieste	19 September 1930	11 August 1933	May 1951
Armando Diaz	Cadorna class	Odero Terni Orlando, Muggiano	28 July 1930	29 April 1933	25 February 1941
Raimondo Montecuccoli	Montecuccoli class	Gio. Ansaldo & C., Sestri Ponente	1 October 1931	30 June 1935	1 June 1964
Muzio Attendolo	Montecuccoli class	Cantieri Riuniti dell'Adriatico, Trieste	10 April 1931	7 August 1935	4 December 1942
Emanuele Filiberto Duca d'Aosta	Duca d'Aosta class	Odero Terni Orlando, Livorno	29 October 1932	13 July 1935	20 February 1959
Eugenio di Savoia	Duca d'Aosta class	Gio. Ansaldo & C., Sestri Ponente	6 July 1933	16 January 1936	1965
Luigi di Savoia Duca degli Abruzzi	Duca degli Abruzzi class	Odero Terni Orlando, Muggiano	28 December 1933	1 December 1937	January 1961
Giuseppe Garibaldi	Duca degli Abruzzi class	Cantieri Riuniti dell'Adriatico, Trieste	28 December 1933	1 December 1937	1971
