= Italian cruiser Raimondo Montecuccoli =

Italian WWII-era light cruiser

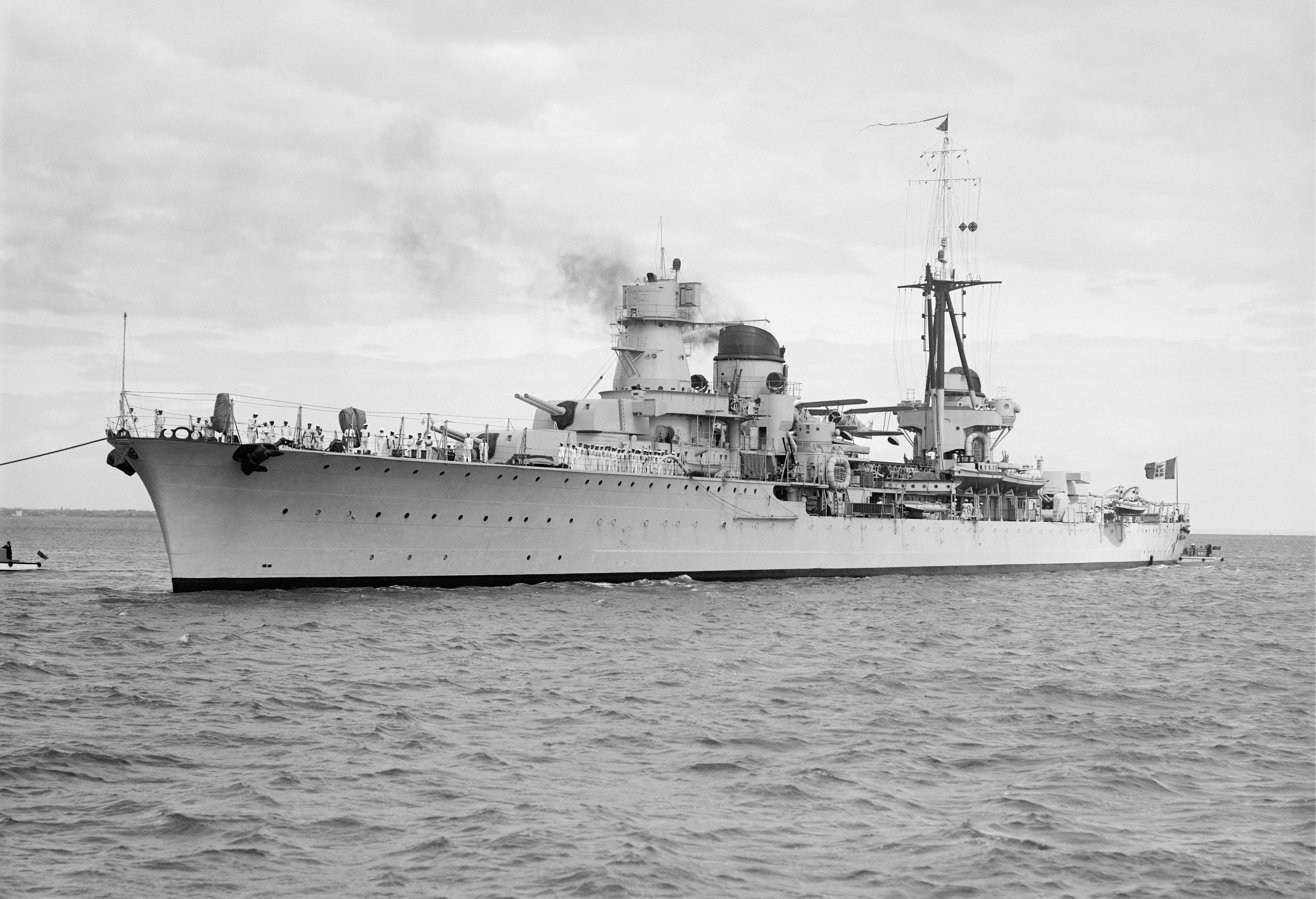
- Raimondo Montecuccoli visiting Australia in 1938

History

Italy
- Name: Raimondo Montecuccoli
- Namesake: Raimondo Montecuccoli
- Builder: Ansaldo, Genoa
- Laid down: 1 October 1931
- Launched: 2 August 1934
- Commissioned: 30 June 1935
- Decommissioned: 1 June 1964
- Fate: Scrapped

General characteristics
- Class & type: Condottieri-class cruiser
- Displacement: 7,523 t (7,404 long tons) standard; 8,994 t (8,852 long tons) full load
- Length: 182.2 m (597 ft 9 in)
- Beam: 16.6 m (54 ft 6 in)
- Draught: 5.6 m (18 ft 4 in)
- Propulsion: 2 shaft Belluzzo geared turbines; 6 Yarrow boilers; 106,000 hp (79,044 kW)
- Speed: 37 knots (43 mph; 69 km/h)
- Range: 4,122 nmi (7,634 km) at 18 kn (21 mph; 33 km/h)
- Complement: 578
- Sensors & processing systems: Gufo radar (1943); Metox radar warning receiver (1943)
- Armament: 8 × 152 mm (6 in) /53 guns (4×2); 6 × 100 mm (4 in) / 47 caliber guns (3×2); 8 × 37 mm (1.5 in) 54-cal. guns (4×2); 8 × 13.2 mm guns (4×2); 4 × 533 mm (21 in) torpedo tubes (2×2)
- Armour: Deck: 30 mm (1.2 in); Main belt: 60 mm (2.4 in); Turrets: 70 mm (2.8 in); Conning tower: 100 mm (3.9 in)
- Aircraft carried: 2 aircraft
- Aviation facilities: 1 catapult

Raimondo Montecuccoli was a Condottieri-class light cruiser serving with the Italian Regia Marina during World War II. She survived the war and served in the post-war Marina Militare until 1964.

== Design ==
Raimondo Montecuccoli, which gives the name to its own sub-class, was part of the third group of Condottieri-class light cruisers. They were larger and better protected than their predecessors; 1,376-tons or 18.3% of her displacement were destined to armour, compared with 8% of the previous Condottieri-class groups. She was built by Ansaldo, Genoa, and was named after Raimondo Montecuccoli, a 17th-century Italian general in Austrian service.

== Career ==
Raimondo Montecuccoli entered service in 1935 and was sent out to the Far East in 1937 to protect Italian interests in China during the Second Sino-Japanese War. She returned home in November 1938 after being relieved by Bartolomeo Colleoni.

In February 1938, while docked in Melbourne, Australia, a diplomatic incident occurred after Frigo Orlando, an Italian resident of Melbourne, was allegedly assaulted by crew members aboard Raimondo Montecuccoli, with the approval of officers. The ship had been opened for inspection by the public. Australian external affairs minister Billy Hughes requested a statement of regret and financial compensation from the acting Italian consul-general in Australia. The incident occurred in the context of a number of previous clashes between the ship's crew and anti-Italian and anti-fascist members of the Australian public.

During the first stages of the war in the Mediterranean, she participated in the Battle of Punta Stilo, on 9 July 1940, and in December the cruiser shelled Greek army positions north of Corfu. In April 1941, Raimondo Montecuccoli laid down an extensive minefield off Cape Bon, along with her sister Muzzio Attendolo and the cruisers Eugenio di Savoia and Duca D'Aosta.

She led the successful attack on Harpoon convoy during the Battle of Pantelleria, on 15 June 1942. Raimondo Montecuccoli and the cruiser Eugenio Di Savoia, forming the 7th Division, fought a long gunnery duel off Pantelleria with the escort of a large Allied convoy to Malta, at the end of which their combined fire crippled the destroyer HMS Bedouin and damaged the cruiser HMS Cairo and the destroyer HMS Partridge; only two ships from the convoy reached Malta, one of them holed by a mine. Partridge took the disabled Bedouin under tow. Two Allied freighters from the convoy, the cargo ship Burdwan and the large tanker Kentucky, both of them brought to a standstill by previous air attacks and abandoned by their escorts, were finished off by the Italian squadron. Kentucky was shelled and set on fire by Raimondo Monteccucoli's guns. While chasing off the escorting vessels of the crippled ships, and according to post-battle reports from both sides, Raimondo Montecuccoli scored a hit on the minesweeper HMS Hebe at "approx. 26,000 yards". Fires erupted aboard Hebe, which received extensive splinter damage. Electrical cables to sweep magnetic and acoustic mines, low power wires, steering gear, echo sounding gear and voice pipes were broken, the Kelvin sounding machine and the Commanding Officer's Cabin damaged, while a whaler was left unseaworthy. The Italian cruisers also forced Partridge to cast off the tow and leave Bedouin behind. The disabled destroyer was eventually sunk by an Italian SM 79 torpedo bomber.

Raimondo Montecuccoli was heavily damaged by USAAF bombers in Naples on 4 December 1942 with the loss of 44 of her crew, but having been repaired just weeks before the armistice in August 1943, she was operative again. The cruiser became by this time one of the few Italian naval units fitted with the Italian-designed EC-3 ter Gufo radar. On 4 August Raimondo Montecuccoli along with the light cruiser Eugenio di Savoia, shelled without consequences a small Allied convoy off Palermo during the Allied invasion of Sicily, in an aborted attempt to attack the United States Navy fleet in port. The Allied convoy was actually an American submarine chaser, USS SC-530, escorting a freshwater barge. The Italian cruisers withdrew after picking up with their Metox devices a number of coastal search radars tracking them. After the Armistice she sailed to Malta with the majority of the remaining Italian fleet. Joining the Italian Co-Belligerent navy, she acted as a fast transport ship for the rest of the war. She remained with Italy after the war to serve as a training cruiser until 1964.

== Preservation ==
Some remains of the ship, along with several artillery pieces and armoured vehicles, are preserved at the Città della Domenica theme and amusement park near Perugia, in Italy. There is the forward mast and a dual artillery mount, placed near the mast.

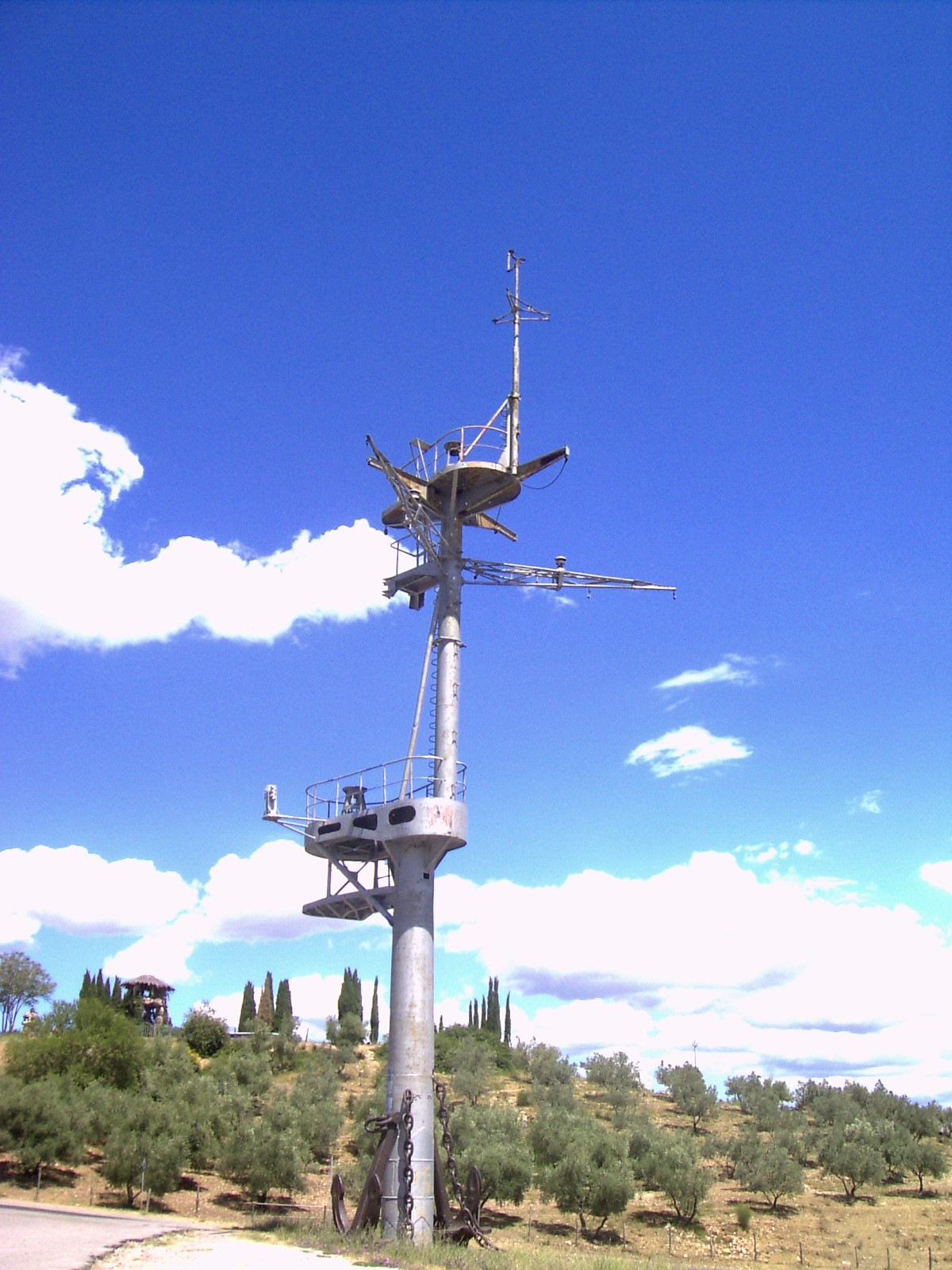

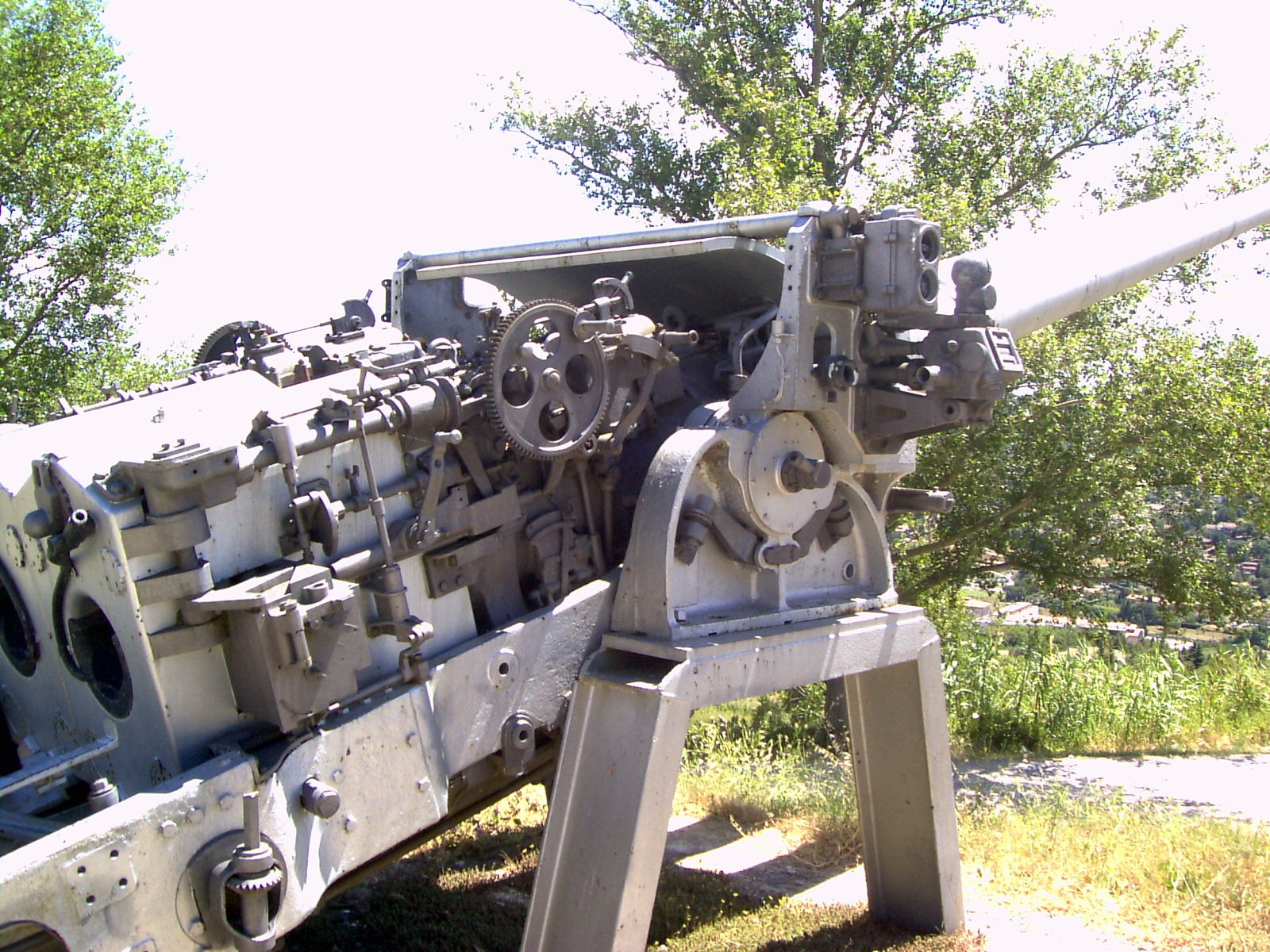

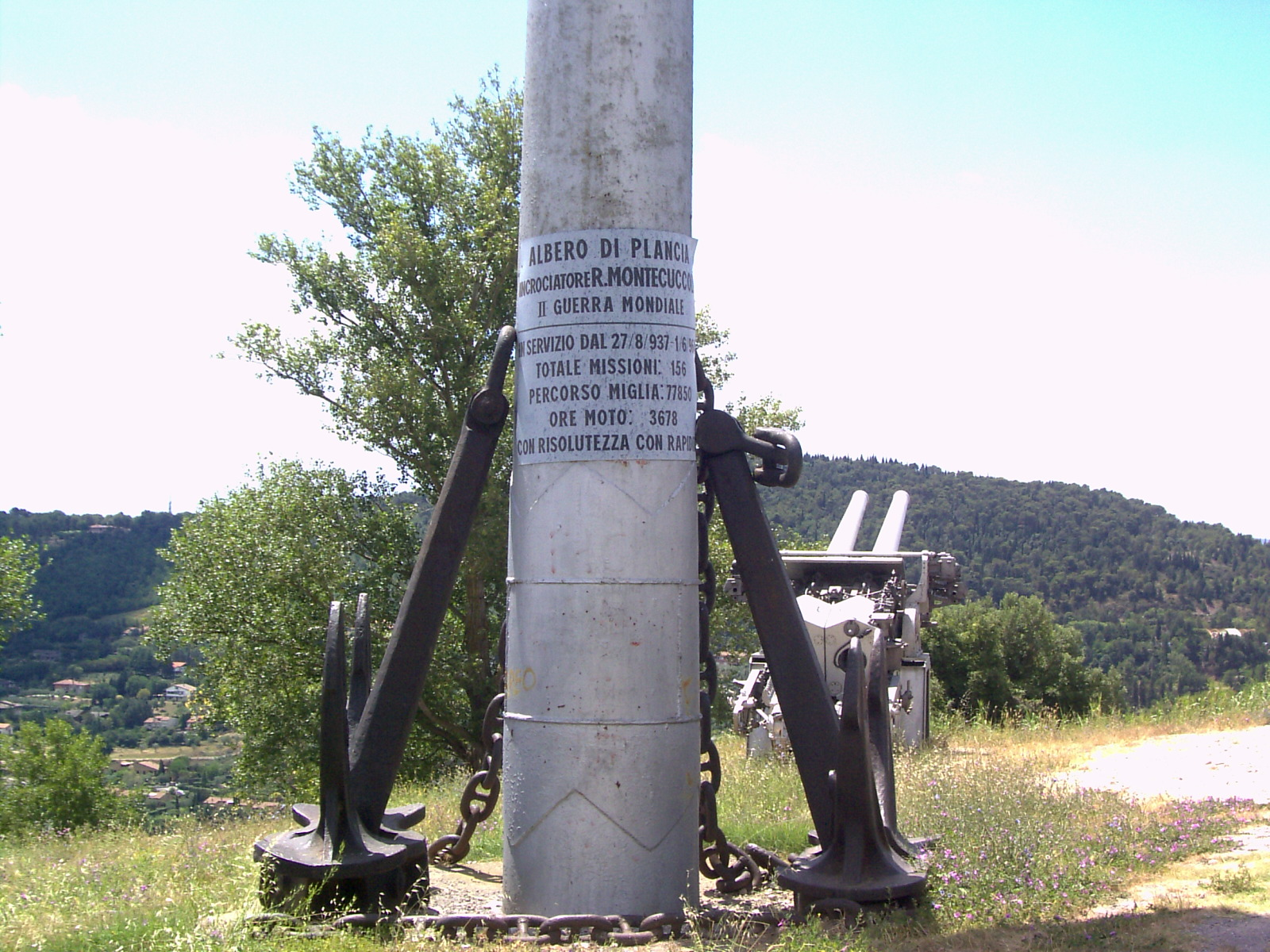

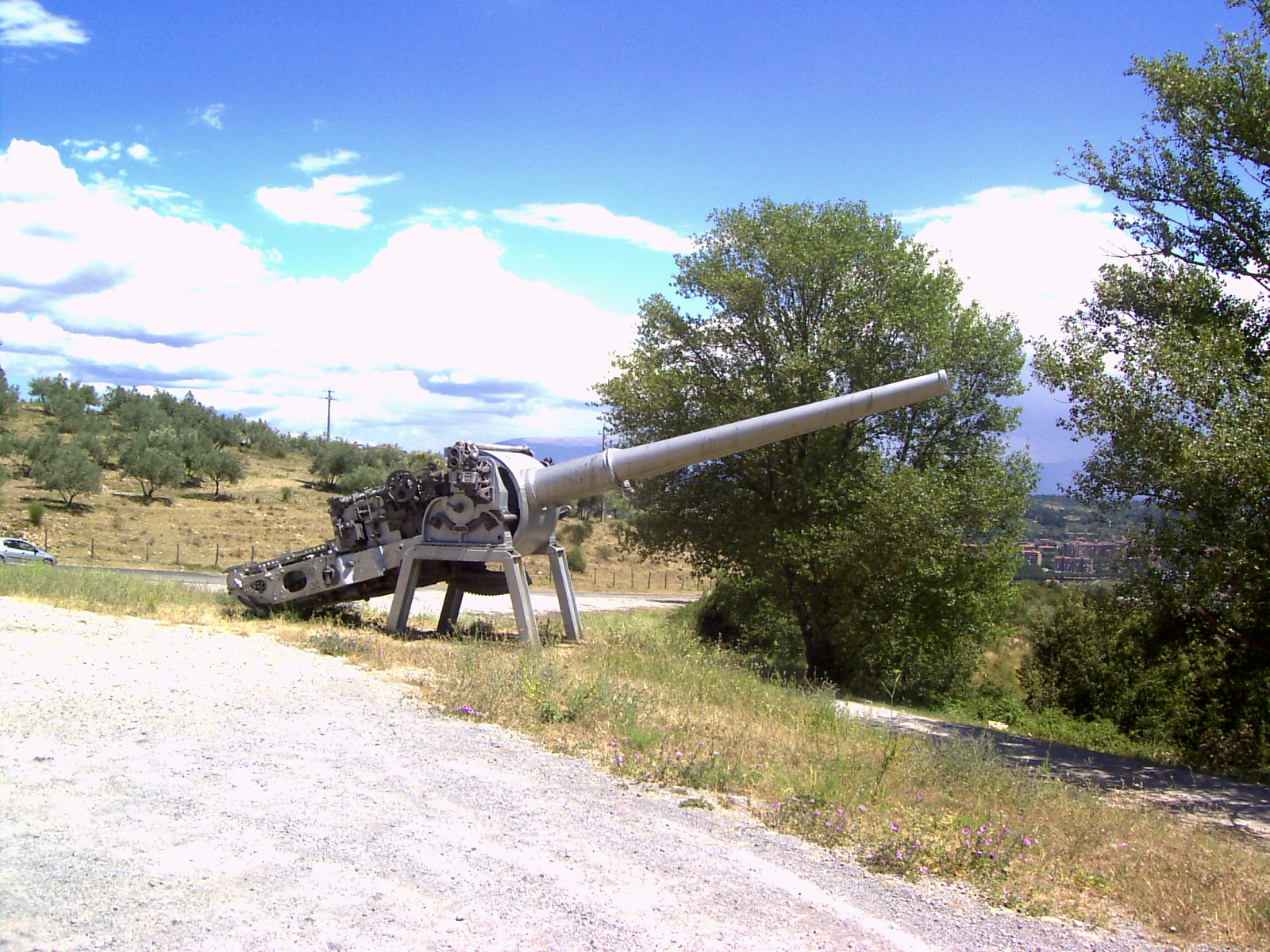
