= 152 mm/53 Italian naval gun Models 1926 and 1929 =

152 mm /53 Model 1926–1929
- Type: Naval gun
- Place of origin: Italy

Service history
- In service: 1926–1964
- Used by: Italy
- Wars: World War II

Production history
- Designer: Ansaldo
- Designed: 1926
- Manufacturer: Ansaldo; OTO Melara
- Produced: 1926–1929

Specifications
- Mass: Model 1926: 7.34 metric tons Model 1929: 7.69 metric tons
- Length: 8.5 meters (27 ft 11 in)
- Barrel length: 8 meters (26 ft 3 in) 53 caliber
- Shell weight: Early: 50 kilograms (110 lb); Late: 47.5 kilograms (105 lb)
- Caliber: 152 millimeters (6.0 in)
- Breech: Horizontal sliding breech block
- Elevation: Model 1926: -5° to +45° Model 1929:-10° to +45°
- Traverse: -150° to +150°
- Rate of fire: Model 1926: 4 rpm Model 1929: 5-8 rpm
- Muzzle velocity: Early: 1,000 m/s (3,300 ft/s); Late: 850 m/s (2,800 ft/s)
- Maximum firing range: Early: 28.4 kilometres (17.6 mi) at +45° Late: 22.6 kilometres (14.0 mi) at +45°

The 152 mm /53 Model 1926–1929 were built for the Italian Navy in the years before World War II. These guns were used on all Condottieri-class light cruisers except the Duca degli Abruzzi subclass.

== Construction ==
The Model 1926 was designed and manufactured by Ansaldo, while the Model 1929 was manufactured by OTO Melara. Although both models of gun were similar in construction, components from each manufacturer were not fully interchangeable.

Commonalities:
- A tube
- Jacket
- Loose liner
- Horizontal sliding breech block
Differences:
- Thickness of liner
- Size of breech ring
- Length of jacket

The gun mounts had electrically powered training, elevation, hoists, rammers and the guns shared a common cradle. Improvements in ammunition handling meant that the rate of fire for the Model 1929 was nearly twice as fast as the Model 1926. Loading was at +20° for the Model 1926, while the model 1929 could be loaded at any angle up to 45°. These guns suffered from dispersion problems so the original muzzle velocity of 1,000 metres per second (3,300 ft/s) was reduced to 850 metres per second (2,800 ft/s) with AP shells. Shell weight was also reduced from 50 kilograms (110 lb) to 47.5 kilograms (105 lb) in an attempt to resolve these problems, but were only partially successful. The main reason for the dispersion problem was because the guns were mounted too close together on a common cradle, which also complicated loading of the guns.

== Naval service ==
The majority of the Condottieri classes had two superfiring twin-mount turrets forward and aft, except for the Duca degli Abruzzi subclass which had different model guns and had two twin turrets replaced with two triple turrets. The Giussano class carried Model 1926 guns, while the Cadorna, Montecuccoli, and Duca d'Aosta subclasses carried Model 1929 guns. The mountings for the Giussano and Cadorna subclasses were found to be too lightly built for the recoil forces created by these guns.

== Ammunition ==
Ammunition was of quick-fire separate loading type. The AP projectile was 63 centimetres (2.07 ft) long with a cartridge case and a bagged charge which weighed 21.43 kilograms (47.2 lb).

The gun was able to fire:

- Armor Piercing (early) - 50 kg (110 lb)
- Armor Piercing (late) - 47.5 kg (105 lb)
- High Explosive - 44.3 kg (98 lb)

== Photo gallery ==
Surviving examples of Model 1929 guns salvaged from the cruiser Raimondo Montecuccoli are located at the Città della Domenica theme and amusement park near Perugia, Italy.

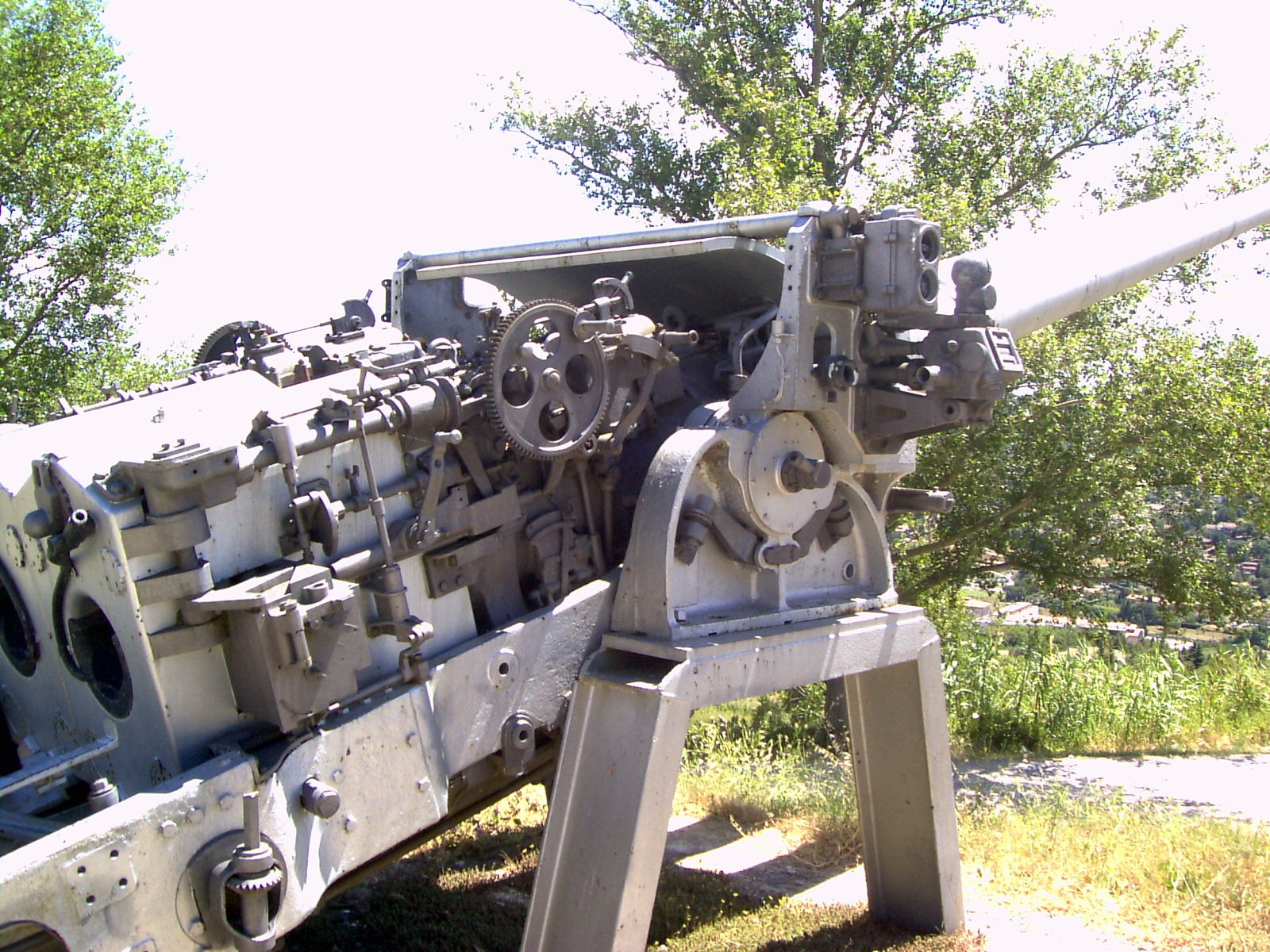

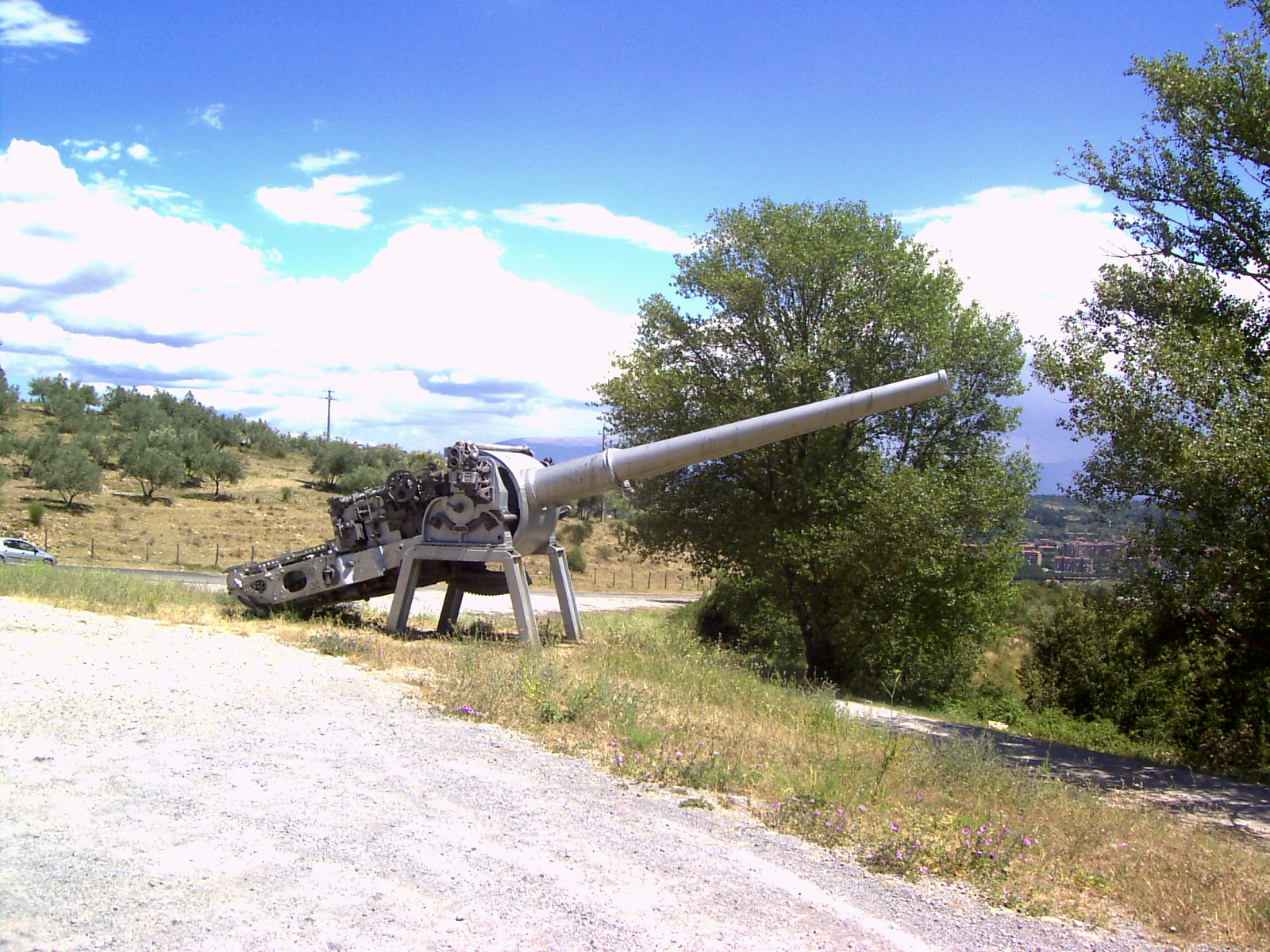

== See also ==
=== Weapons of comparable role, performance and era ===
- BL 6-inch Mk XXII naval gun approximate British equivalent deployed on battleships
- 6-inch/53-caliber gun US equivalent
