= Operation Stonewall =

Naval operation during the Second World War

Second World War
- Part of the Battle of the Atlantic
- The Bay of Biscay
Date	26–27 December 1943
Location	Bay of Biscay 45°30′N 04°24′W
Result	Allied victory

Belligerents
(Nazi Germany) Germany (Empire of Japan) Japan (Intelligence support)	United Kingdom; United States; Canada; Australia; New Zealand; (Czechoslovak government-in-exile) Czechoslovakia; (Vargas Era) Brazil; (Kingdom of Italy) Italy; Free France

Commanders and leaders
Karl Dönitz	Ralph Leatham

Units involved
Befehlshaber der U-Boote (Commander, U-boats); Marine-Gruppenkommando West (Naval Group West); Luftwaffe (Fliegerfuhrer Atlantik)	Royal Navy; US Navy (ships and aircraft); Royal Canadian Navy; Royal New Zealand Navy; Free French Naval Forces; Regia Marina; Royal Air Force; Royal Canadian Air Force; Royal Australian Air Force; Brazilian Air Force; Czechoslovak Air Force (in British service)

Casualties and losses
1 blockade-runner; 1 Destroyer; 2 torpedo boats; 1 U-boat	2 destroyers
- Neutral ships from Ireland and Spain rescued some German survivors

Operation Stonewall was an Allied naval and air operation in the Second World War from 26 to 27 December 1943, to intercept blockade-runners sailing to German-occupied France through the Bay of Biscay. Operations Barrier and Freecar, by the Allied navies and the Brazilian Air Force, had taken place in the south- and mid-Atlantic. The ships were tracked by OP-20-G (US Navy) and British (Government Code and Cypher School (GC&CS) at Bletchley Park) code-breakers, which decrypted Japanese machine cyphers and German Enigma machine transmissions to U-boats (Shark cypher) and blockade-runners (Sunfish cypher).

At the west end of the Bay of Biscay, Royal Navy and Allied ships, with Coastal Command aircraft of Operation Stonewall hunted the blockade-runners, assisted by convoy Escort Groups and support groups diverted from nearby convoys. Osorno and Alsterufer were the first two blockade-runners of the late 1943 – early 1944 season. Osorno evaded interception and was escorted into the estuary of the Gironde by German destroyers and torpedo boats (small destroyers).

On 27 December, Alsterufer was spotted by a fighter from an American escort carrier, then attacked by Australian, British and Canadian, Coastal Command, Sunderland flying boats but suffered little damage. At 4:07 p.m. Liberator GR Mk V "H" of 311 (Czechoslovak) Squadron made a low-altitude attack on Alsterufer with rockets and bombs, setting the ship on fire. Alsterufer sank the next day and 74 survivors were rescued 48 hours later by Canadian corvettes.

The German destroyers and torpedo boats that had escorted Osorno to port sailed to rendezvous with Alsterufer, the Germans being unaware of the bombing of the ship. Using Enigma decrypts of their positions, the German ships were bombed by US Liberators and then intercepted by the cruisers HMS Glasgow and Enterprise of Operation Stonewall. In the Battle of the Bay of Biscay one of the destroyers and two torpedo boats were sunk in battle during a severe storm. Sailings of blockade-runners from France were cancelled and three runners from Japan were sunk by the US Navy in the south Atlantic in January 1944.

== Background ==
=== Allied blockade of Germany ===
From the start of the war on 3 September 1939, the Allies proclaimed a blockade of Germany to prevent the import of goods. Germany had no rubber, oil, tin and tungsten. Until Operation Barbarossa the German invasion of the Soviet Union, it evaded the blockade via the Trans-Siberian Railway. After the supply route was closed at the start of Barbarossa and after the Japanese entry into the war, German and Italian ships were stranded in Japan and Japanese-occupied Singapore. The ships were used as blockade-runners, sailing to ports in occupied France after mid-1940, when Germany had taken control of the European coast from Norway to the French–Spanish border. From April 1941 to May 1942, 32 ships tried to reach France and 14 succeeded. In 1941 and 1942, German and Italian ships brought in 70,000 long tons (71,000 t) of commodities and exported 32,540 long tons (33,060 t) to Japan. From August 1942 to April 1943 fifteen ships tried to run the blockade and four got through.

=== Blockade-running ===
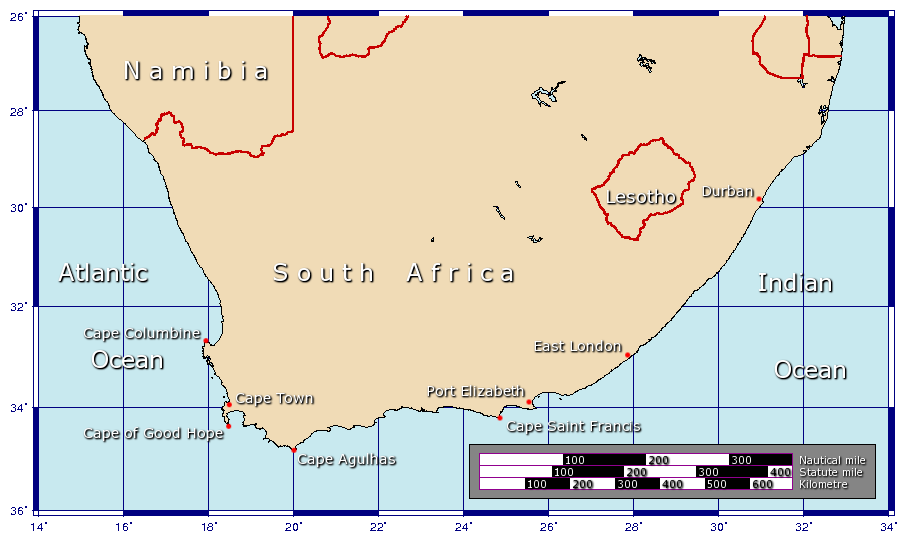
Map of the Cape of Good Hope in South Africa

After sailing from Japan, through the Pacific and the Indian Ocean to the Cape of Good Hope, blockade-runners kept radio silence and passed rearranging points at planned times. When a ship was due, U-boats and aircraft were barred from attacking merchant ships in a 200 nmi (370 km; 230 mi) lane in the mid-Atlantic, to the north-east from a line level with the Canary Islands, east of the Azores and then east to Bordeaux. Escorts were laid on through the Bay of Biscay and the ships received occasional support further out from U-boats. After the cargo has been discharged, the ship was re-fitted for the next journey.

More accommodation was built for crew and passengers, decks were reinforced, guns and ammunition stores were installed. A minimum of four scuttling charges of up to 165 lb (75 kg) were placed in the bottom of the hull and armed when the ship sailed with 7–9-minute fuzes; the crew kept their belongings ready in case they abandoned the ship. The vessel went into dry dock to have the hull cleaned to increase its speed and the ship underwent sea trials, sometimes incorporating the delivery of goods to Bassens or to another Biscay port. When ready to sail, the ship waited in the Gironde for an escort of minesweepers. Early in the war, the sailing schedule was little different from a peacetime commercial service.

==== 1943–1944 season ====
U-boats were used to transport small amounts of commodities in 1943 while bigger transport submarines were built but by winter German industry would need several shiploads of rubber and other cargoes. Despite the risks several ships would have to be despatched from Japan. There were five motor vessels in Japan and it was thought that if they left at fairly frequent intervals, the Allies might be distracted by the hunt for one and let another slip through their blockades. The ships would be on their own on the voyage but the run through the Bay of Biscay could be assisted by surface ships and aircraft. The five ships would carry 33,095 long tons (33,626 t) of rubber and other goods and sail at intervals that would allow the Biscay escort forces to meet one about 400 nmi (460 mi; 740 km) out from Bordeaux, escort it to port and then sail to meet the next one. The best time for the attempts to run the blockade would be midwinter 1943–1944. (Note: each ship would carry a man under arrest to Europe; one prisoner was alleged to have been a communist and member of the spy ring run by Richard Sorge. The Gestapo in Japan ordered that the men were to be left in confinement if ships were scuttled, to prevent them talking to the Allies. Admiral Paul Wenneker, the Naval Attaché in Tokyo, questioned the orders with Seekriegsleitung in Berlin and passed on the orders but implied that they might not have to be followed.)

MV Osorno (6,951 GRT, code-name Bernau, Kapitän Paul Hellmann) of the Hamburg America Line (HAPAG) with 3,882 long tons (3,944 t) of rubber, 1,797 long tons (1,826 t) of tin and 177 long tons (180 t) of tungsten, sailed from Kobe on 2 October, disguised as the British ship Prome, rounding the Cape of Good Hope on 15 November. Osorno was followed by the refrigerated cargo ship (reefer) Alsterufer (2,729 GRT, code-name Trave,Kapitän Piatek) of the Robert M. Sloman Jr. line of Hamburg, carrying 344 long tons (350 t) of tungsten, a year's worth of consumption in the German war economy. Rio Grande sailed third on 4 October 1943 from Yokohama; Weserland and Burgenland departed later in the month. Allied spies reported the arrival of the first three ships at Saigon (now Ho Chi Minh City), raising the alarm.

=== Ultra ===
Locator map of the Azores

The defeat of the German U-boat offensive in the Battle of the Atlantic in 1943 was followed by the last attempt by the Germans to pass blockade-runners through the Bay of Biscay to and from the Japanese empire. From May 1943 decrypts of Japanese diplomatic wireless traffic revealed to the Allies that the losses of the 1942–1943 season had not deterred the Axis from making another attempt in the autumn. Seven merchant ships were to sail from Europe carrying 50,000 long tons (51,000 t) of exports and that the Germans were building special U-boats to import 3,000 long tons (3,000 t) of goods from Japan in 1943. In July and August, photographic reconnaissance and agent reports from the French Atlantic ports that sailings for the far East were being prepared and by 6 September it was clear that seven ships were close to sailing.

On 4 October, after the blockade-runner Kulmerland had been hit by Allied bombers, a signal from the Japanese Ambassador in Berlin showed the Allies that the export programme had been cut to 35,000 long tons (36,000 t) because of the bombing. On 18 July the British and Portuguese reached a basing agreement for the Azores, which came into force on 8 October and which had the potential to deter the Axis from trying to run the blockade. On 23 October, the Germans introduced new W/T methods for signalling between U-boats and blockade-runners in the Bay of Biscay and in early November Dresden, thought to be a blockade-runner, struck a mine. The British thought that five ships were preparing to leave the Bay and that four ships were preparing to return from the Far East. Later in November, another decrypt from the Japanese Ambassador revealed that the German export programme had been reduced again, to 29,000 long tons (29,000 t). US Navy patrols in the South Atlantic were increased.

== Prelude ==
=== Allied intelligence ===
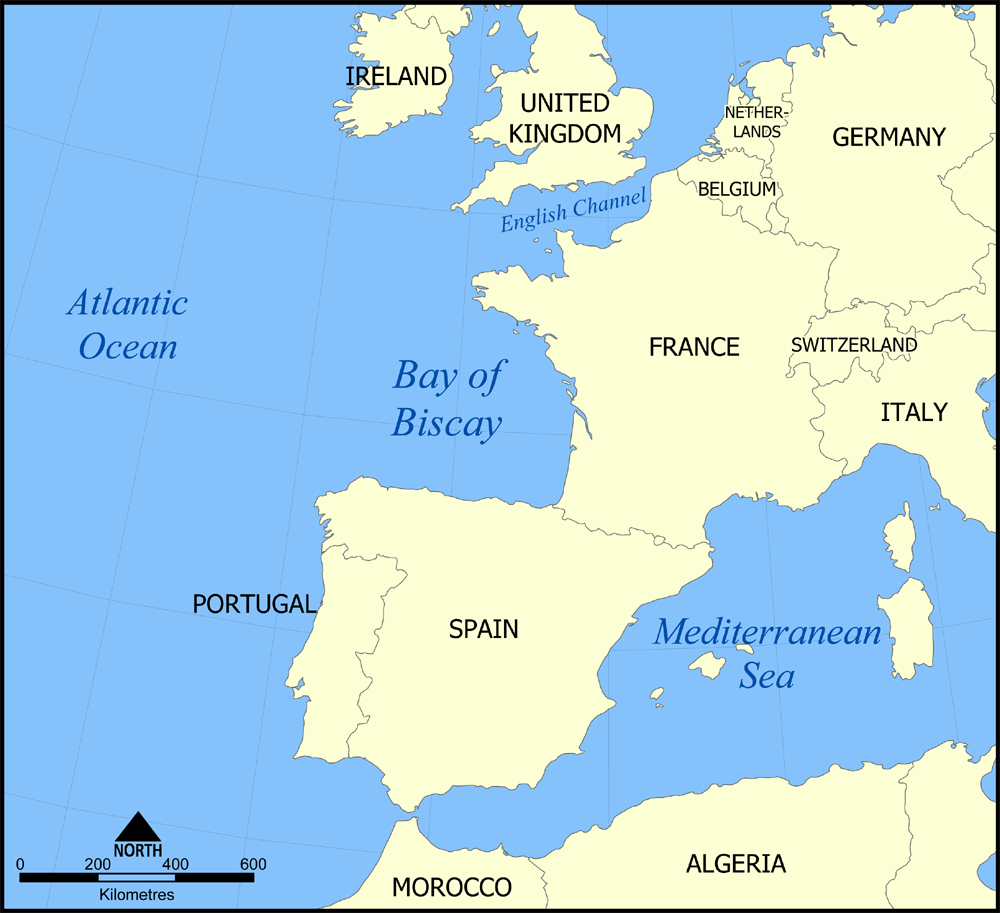
Map of the Bay of Biscay

The Ministry of Economic Warfare in London knew that the winter would be the best time for blockade-runners and photographic reconnaissance revealed that the number of German warships in the French Biscay ports had been increased. Enigma decrypts and agent reports from the Far East alerted the Allies. Evidence that the new round of departures from the Far East had begun was found in an Ultra decrypt of 16 November, prohibiting U-boat attacks west of a line in the south Atlantic.

The Naval and air commanders were told that a northbound blockade-runner and possibly another eight were approaching, including Osorno and Alsterufer. Little was revealed by OP-20-G, the US Navy (USN) code-breaking organisation, until 26 November, that on the day before the U-boat restrictions ("Kammerarrest") in the south Atlantic had been imposed further north on 1 December. (Note: The sailing of five blockade runners had been revealed to US code-breakers by the Purple and Bertok/Barnacle cyphers.) On 26 November the Italian ship Pietro Orseolo sailed from Bordeaux to Concarneau on the south Brittany coast and was attacked by aircraft from Coastal Command on 1 December to no effect.

=== Operation Barrier ===
Operation Barrier began with Task Force 41 (TF.41) comprising five task groups, of a cruiser and a destroyer each, three of which were permanently at sea and USN aircraft patrols from Natal in Brazil, with Brazilian Air Force patrols from Recife (at war with Germany and Italy since 22 August 1942) and flights by USN patrol bombers from Ascension Island on 1 December. More information was received by the Allies on 5 December that the restrictions were in force north of the equator from the next day. Osorno was spotted on 8 December by Liberator B-8 of VPB-107 from Ascension but TG.41.4 (the cruiser USS Marblehead and the destroyer Winslow) were chasing another contact which turned out to be a Greek independent, then began a hunt for a U-boat and Osorno escaped. (Note: The U-boat was German submarine U-510 a large Type IXC submarine sailing to the Far East to collect cargo to bring to Europe.) The Admiralty signalled the importance given to preventing the arrival of blockade-runners on 12 December and the Royal Navy light cruiser HMS Glasgow left on patrol from the Azores. Searches to the north-west found nothing but Osorno had been sighted by U-510 whose report was decrypted by OP-20-G on 13 December.

=== Operation Freecar ===
Freecar began soon after Barrier with HMS Corfu and Cilicia both armed merchant cruisers, the French cruiser Suffren and the Italian cruisers Abruzzi and d'Aosta. Barrier and Freecar were suspended, letting Alsterufer pass unseen. On 18 December, a Sunfish message sent on 13 December to Osorno and Asterufer was decrypted and on 22 December a decrypt of the U-boat Shark cypher showed that the U-boat restrictions were in force west of the Bay of Biscay.

== Operation Stonewall ==
=== Plymouth Command ===
Coastal Command prepared Halifax and Liberator bombers to attack the blockade-runners as they crossed the Bay of Biscay. The Royal New Zealand Navy (RNZN) light cruiser HMNZS Gambia, recently refitted, arrived at Plymouth from Scotland on 5 December 1943. Gambia was to join Glasgow and Enterprise under the command of the Commander-in-Chief Plymouth (Admiral Ralph Leatham) for operations against blockade runners. U-boats were sailing in distant waters which required more signals from Admiral Karl Dönitz (Befehlshaber der U-Boote, BdU, Commander, U-boats) about blockade-runners. The Shark cypher for U-boats was often being decrypted quickly by the Government Code and Cypher School which then broke the Sunfish Enigma key used by the blockade-runners.

=== Osorno ===
Convoy codes
Code	Route
CU	Curaçao/New York to UK (tankers)
GUS	Port Said to US Slow
HX	Halifax to UK
KMF	UK to Mediterranean Fast
KMS	UK to Mediterranean Slow
MKS	Mediterranean to UK Slow
ON	Outward North (UK to US)
OS	Outbound South (UK to Freetown)
SC	Sydney/Halifax/New York to UK
SL	Freetown to UK
UGS	US to Port Said/Gibraltar

After Osorno managed to pass the Natal–Freetown narrows, Leatham began Operation Stonewall. Gambia and Glasgow sailed from Plymouth to Horta in the Azores taking turns to patrol, fuelling from a tanker at Horta. Osorno turned eastwards at the Grand Banks of Newfoundland. From 16 to 17 December, Osorno (Bernau) crossed the US to Gibraltar convoy route undetected. On 18 December Osorno passed itself off as the British Landsman en route from Cape Town to Liverpool to a Sunderland flying-boat that investigated it. During the night a British destroyer passed close by and warned Osorno that a U-boat was in the vicinity before beginning a depth-charge attack on the suspected submarine; Osorno managed to steal away.

Coastal Command attacked the outbound Pietro Orseolo on 18 December, with six Torbeau torpedo-bombers of 254 Squadron and six Beaufighters of 248 Squadron for Flak suppression, escorted by eight Typhoon fighters, hitting it amidships twice with torpedoes; the ship exploded and sank off Lorient the next morning. On 19 December Osorno passed through the US–UK route near Convoy ON 215, following a day behind Convoy HX 270 and a day in front of Convoy SC 149. From 21 to 22 December, Osorno turned east for the Bay of Biscay and crossed the paths of Convoy KMF 27 and Convoy MKS 33/SL 142, which was accompanied by Escort Group B4 and a support group based on HMS Fencer. The Germans were as ignorant of the position of Osorno as the Allies and Wolfpack Borkum was formed from the southernmost boats of Wolfpack Coronel to attack Convoy MKS 33/SL 142 to cover the return of Orsorno. (Note: Wolfpack Coronel was operating further north and Borkum comprised U-801, U-107, U-667, U-618, U-270, U-541, U-645, U-962, U-415, U-305, U-275, U-382 and U-641.)

German signals to establish Wolfpack Borkum were decrypted by the Allies and TG.21.15, comprising the escort carrier USS Core with the destroyers, USS Greene, Belknap, George E. Badger and Goldsborough detached from Convoy GUS 24 to hunt the U-boats. TG.21.14, with the escort carrier Card and the destroyers Leary, Schenck and Decatur joined the hunt and Wolfpack Borkum was assisted by five FW 200 Kondor bombers flying by day, a BV 222 flying boat flying on the night of 20/21 December and more aircraft during the next day but no ships were sunk. German aircraft reported the escort carrier groups three times on 22 and 23 December. Gambia and Glasgow were behind Osorno. On 23 December, a F4F fighter from Card sighted a ship about 500 nmi (930 km; 580 mi) south-west of Ushant; Osorno failed to give the right answer to the challenge, despite flying the Red Ensign. The destroyers of TG.21.14 were too short of fuel and could not leave Card when U-boats were known to be close. Card had to close its flight-deck after accidents then the Task Group was distracted by the attacks of Wolfpack Borkum which had the benefit of aircraft flying from land bases. (Note: During the night of 23/24 December U-305 sighted TG.21.14 but was deterred by one of the destroyers, which detected it with HF/DF (Huff-Duff). U-415 fired three FAT (Flächenabsuchender Torpedo [area searching torpedo]) at Card but missed and also missed Decatur with a G7es torpedo (T5) acoustic torpedo. U-645 missed Schenk with a T5 and was sunk by depth charges; U-275 hit the destroyer Leary with a T5 and it was later sunk by a torpedo from U-382; TG.21.14 then had to withdraw because of fuel shortage.) During the evening of 24 December, Convoy OS 62/KMS 36 from the north with Escort Group B1 and the support group of the escort carrier HMS Striker ran into Wolfpack Borkum. U-415 sank HMS Hurricane with a T5 torpedo.

==== Unternehmen Bernau ====
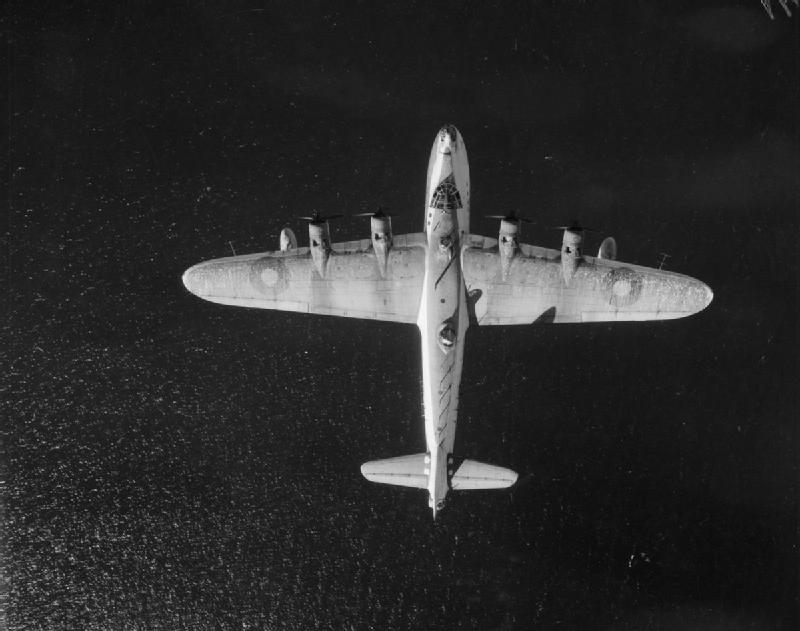
Coastal Command Sunderland Mk III flying boat of 10 Squadron RAAF

At noon on 24 December, the 8. Zerstörerflotille (8th Destroyer Flotilla, Captain Erdmenger) Z 27, Z 23, Z 24, Z 32, Z 37 and ZH 1 were sent to escort Osorno The 4. Torpedobootsflottille (4th Torpedo Boat Flotilla, Korvettenkapitän Franz Kohlauf) with T 22, T 23, T 24, T 25, T 26 and T 27 also took part in Unternehmen Bernau, departing from the Biscay ports to rendezvous with Osorno and escort it to port. From dawn on 25 December, Sunderland flying boats from 201 Squadron RAF, 422 Squadron RCAF and 461 Squadron RAAF were in contact with Osorno and one was claimed shot down by Osorno after it came too close and appeared to crash into the sea. At noon on a cloudy day, when about 450 nmi (520 mi; 830 km) west of the French coast, the lookouts on Osorno spotted destroyers with characteristic German funnel caps.

An hour later, Osorno was encircled by eleven destroyers and torpedo boats. The ships had an array of 207 guns from 20 mm to 150 mm and 76 torpedoes; long-range Ju 88 fighters sent by Fliegerführer Atlantik flew overhead. Despite the air cover, Halifax GR.Mk.II bombers, including eight from 502 Squadron attacked from 4:20 to 7:15 p.m., "Q" claiming a hit one a ship. As night fell, 58 Mosquitos and Torbeau torpedo-bombers of 19 Group Coastal Command failed to find the German ships. Osorno reached the swept channel of the Gironde estuary, then ran into the wreck of Sperrbrecher 21 and had to be beached at Le Verdon-sur-Mer at the entrance to the estuary. Bomber Command sent five Stirling mine-layers on the night of 29/30 December and the waters around the ship were mined to obstruct the unloading of its cargo of rubber but the Germans got most of it ashore.

=== Alsterufer ===
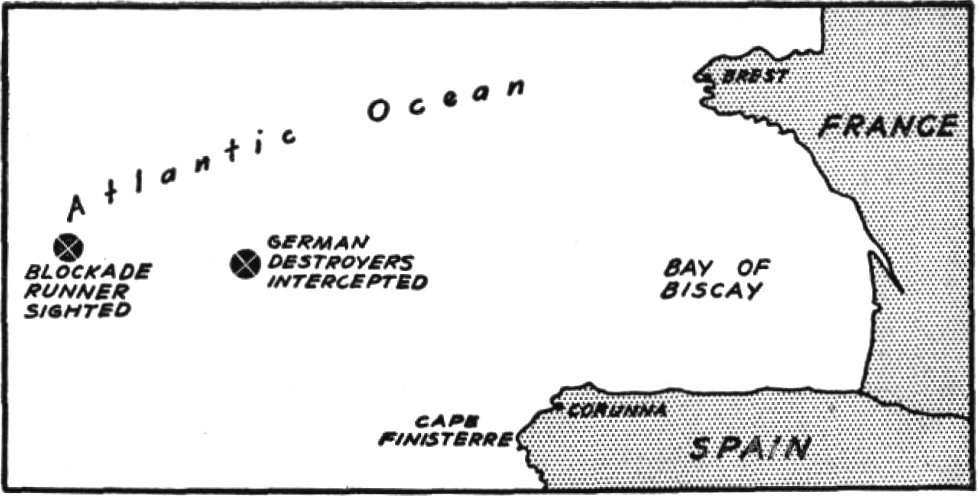
Map showing the location of Alsterufer when it was sunk and of the Battle of the Bay of Biscay

Alsterufer passed the South Atlantic narrows undetected and crossed the US–Gibraltar route on 20 December, not far from TG.21.16, which included the carrier USS Block Island and four destroyers. Alsterufer was behind the westbound Convoy GUS 23 and near the eastbound Convoy UGS 27. By 23 December Alsterufer was distant from Convoy CU 9 to the east, TG.21.16 to the south-east and Convoy SC 149 to the north. The 8th destroyer Flotilla (8. Zerstörerflotille) and the 4th Torpedo boat Flotilla (4. Torpedobootflottille), less ZH 1, which had engine-trouble, sailed into the Bay of Biscay again on Unternehmen Trave (Operation Beam) on 26 December to meet Alsterufer and escort it into the Gironde. Alsterufer was spotted at 10:15 a.m. on 27 December about 500 nmi (580 mi; 930 km) north-west of Cape Finisterre and kept Sunderland "T" of 201 Squadron at a distance with anti-aircraft fire. The Sunderland circled the ship for 2 1/2 hours, being joined by "Q" from 422 Squadron RCAF and "U", also from 201 Squadron. When "T" had to turn for home it attacked but missed, Alsterufer making 15.5 kn (28.7 km/h; 17.8 mph).

Piatek was concerned about discipline amongst the crew, because they had hoped to make port before Christmas and he had refused to allow them to sample any of the 6,000 bottles of beer on board to avoid the rigours of the Bay of Biscay crossing "with a tipsy crew". During the morning, Alsterufer was attacked by Sunderland "Q" of 422 Squadron RCAF and "U" of 201 Squadron flown by Leslie Baveystock who wrote later,

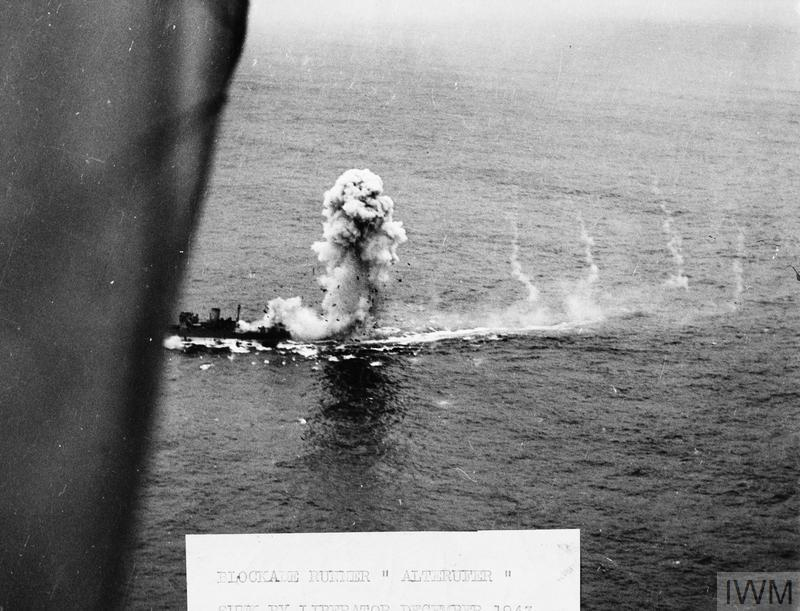
Alsterufer under attack by a Czechoslovak-crewed RAF Liberator

By the time we had spotted the ship we were down to 200 feet with our quarry dead ahead in what should have been an ideal position. If I released our bombs we just couldn't miss, but their forward speed, being the same as that of our aircraft, would have resulted in explosions directly under us, with the consequent dire damage to ourselves. This I could not risk.

the gunners strafed Alsterufer and the Sunderland climbed to 1,000 ft (300 m), bombing and depth-charging by radar, to little effect. Baveystock "cursed the stupid Armaments Office for not giving us delay fuses on our bombs, as he should have done". (Note: Baveystock headed for base Castle Archdale in Northern Ireland but short of fuel, landed near St Mary's in the Scilly Isles.)

==== Unternehmen Trave ====
Fliegerführer Atlantik promised aircraft but Marinegruppe West could offer no ships until the next morning. The light cruiser Enterprise, to the east of Alsterufer and Glasgow 300 nmi (560 km; 350 mi) to the west, were ordered to make their best speed to a point 300 nmi (560 km; 350 mi) north-west of Cape Finisterre. At 4:07 p.m. Liberator GR Mk V "H" of 311 (Czech) Squadron, sighted Alsterufer. (Note: Captain, Pilot Officer Oldřich Doležal with Sergeant Robert Prochazka, co-pilot, Flying Officer Zdeněk Hanuš, Navigator/Bomb Aimer, Warrant Officer Josef Kosek, Air Gunner, Flight Sergeant Jindřich Hahn, Radar Operator/Air Gunner, Flight Sergeant Marcel Ludikar, Wireless Operator/Air Gunner, Flight Sergeant Ivan Schwarz, Wireless Operator/Air Gunner and Sergeant František Veitl, Flight Engineer.) The Liberator made a diving attack on Alsterufer through its anti-aircraft fire and fired its eight wing-mounted, semi-armour piercing (SAP60) rocket projectiles. Five of the rockets hit the ship above the waterline and a 500 lb (230 kg) bomb and a 250 lb (110 kg) bomb hitting the ship aft of the funnel, killing two sailors and setting the ship on fire. Anti-aircraft fire and parachute-and-cable rockets had hit the Liberator's starboard outer engine but the aircraft returned to base at RAF Beaulieu in England. Four hours later, two Liberators of 86 Squadron finished off the ship. Alsterufer sank on the afternoon of 28 December. Four lifeboats with 74 survivors were picked up two days later by four Canadian corvettes. (Note: The survivors gave great praise to the Czech Liberator crew who had flown "unperturbed through the heaviest barrage".)

=== Battle of the Bay of Biscay ===
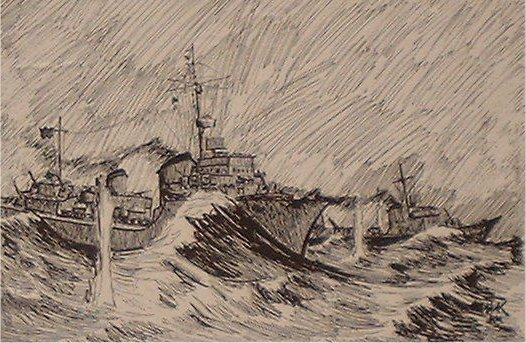
A view from Z27 of T25 and T26 being shelled drawn by Hans Helmut Karsch, a German sailor, during his internment at the Curragh Camp. (National Maritime Museum of Ireland)

Gambia departed from Faial Island in the Azores on 27 December, its Captain, William Powlett, being made commander of Force 3, the ships already at sea, the light cruiser Penelope and the fast minelayer Ariadne from Gibraltar and the Free French large destroyers, Le Fantasque and Le Malin from the Azores.The Allied cruiser captains were told that about a dozen German destroyers could be on the way to rendezvous with the blockade runner. Naval Group West did not find out about the loss of Alsterufer until morning on 28 December and cancelled Unternehmen Bernau, ordering the ships to return. The flotilla was spotted by a US Liberator of VPB-105 and attacked by fifteen more Liberators from that squadron and VPB-103, which enabled Glasgow and Enterprise to intercept them at noon.

The eleven ships of the flotilla had twenty-five 150 mm and twenty-four 105 mm guns against the nineteen 6-inch and thirteen 4-inch guns of the cruisers. The German flotilla tried to attack the cruisers from both flanks but the stormy seas prevented the ships from sailing at their maximum speed. Z 27 (Captain Günther Schultz, with the flotilla commander, Captain Erdmenger, aboard), T 25 and T 26 were sunk. Shortage of ammunition on Glasgow and mechanical defects in Enterprise led them to break off the action rather than pursue the other ships. Z 24, T 23, T 24 and T 27 returned to Brest; Z 32, and Z 37 got to the Gironde and Z 23 with T 22, which had turned south, made port at St Jean de Luz. Sixty-four survivors were rescued by Royal Navy minesweepers, 168 by the Irish coaster, Kerlogue, six by Spanish destroyers and 55 by German submarine U-505 and German submarine U-618. Glasgow, Enterprise and Ariadne returned to Plymouth under glider-bomb attack and Penelope, Le Fantasque and Le Malin to Gibraltar. Gambia and Mauritius patrolled north of the Azores for blockade-runners until 1 January.

== Aftermath ==
=== Analysis ===
Morale in the Kriegsmarine was depressed further with the news that the battleship Scharnhorst had been sunk on 26 December at the Battle of the North Cape. Osorno was the last blockade-runner to reach port, its cargo of rubber meeting German needs until November 1944. In 1984, Harry Hinsley wrote in the official history of British intelligence in the war that the defeat of the German destroyer flotilla, like the sinking of Scharnhorst, could only have happened because the Admiralty was receiving decrypts of Enigma messages almost as quickly as their German addressees. The engagement also finally made the Admiralty admit that the German Type 1936A destroyers (Narvik-class to the British) carried 6 in (150 mm) guns.

=== Casualties ===
Three men on Alsterufer were killed and 74 were rescued. Of the 672 men on the three German warships, 93 were rescued from Z27, 100 from T25 and 90 from T26. About 62 survivors were picked up by British minesweepers, 168 were rescued by Kerlogue a small Irish steamer and four by Spanish destroyers. In 2003, Gerhard Koop and Klaus-Peter Schmolke wrote that there were 740 men in the three ships and that 293 men survived, 21 rescued by U-618, 34 by U-505, six by Spanish destroyers, 64 by British minesweepers and 168 by an Irish merchant ship.

=== Subsequent operations ===
The last three blockade-runners, Weserland, Burgenland and Rio Grande were known to the Allied through decrypts of their sailings from the Far East. US naval forces intercepted them in the south Atlantic from 3 to 5 January 1944. After another nine days, Sunfish decrypts revealed that the Germans did not know of the interceptions and had ordered two of their blockade-runners to prepare to sail. On 21 January it was discovered that all four blockade-runners preparing for the voyage top the Far East had been ordered to stand down because of the risk of interception. (Note: After the war it was found that Dönitz had suggested to Hitler on 18 January 1944 that blockade-running be cancelled.)

== Allied order of battle ==
=== US Navy ===
==== 4th Fleet Air Wing ====
Fairwing Sixteen
Sqn	Flag	Type	No.	Notes
VP-94	United States Navy	PBY-5A Catalina	14	Based at Natal, Brazil
VP-127	United States Navy	PV-1 Ventura	12	Based at Natal, Brazil
VB-107	United States Navy	PB4Y-1 Liberator	12	Based at Natal, Brazil
VB-129	United States Navy	PV-1 Ventura	12	Based at Recife, Brazil
VP-74	United States Navy	PBM-3 Mariner	12	Based at Bahia, Brazil
VB-130	United States Navy	PV-1 Ventura	12	Based at Fotaleza, Brazil
VB-145	United States Navy	PV-1 Ventura	12	Based at Natal, Brazil
VB-203	United States Navy	PBM-3 Mariner	14	Based at Bahia, Brazil
VP-211	United States Navy	PBM-3 Mariner	12	Based at Rio de Janeiro, Brazil
VB-143	United States Navy	PV-1 Ventura	12	Based at Recife, Brazil

==== Task Force 21 ====
TF.21.
Name	Flag	Type	Notes
USS Card	United States Navy	Bogue-class escort carrier	Task Group.21.14
USS Decatur	United States Navy	Clemson-class destroyer	Task Group.21.14
USS Leary	United States Navy	Wickes-class destroyer	Task Group.21.14
USS Schenck	United States Navy	Wickes-class destroyer	Task Group.21.14
USS Core	United States Navy	Bogue-class escort carrier	Task Group.21.15
USS Belknap	United States Navy	Clemson-class destroyer	Task Group.21.15
USS George E. Badger	United States Navy	Clemson-class destroyer	Task Group.21.15
USS Goldsborough	United States Navy	Clemson-class destroyer	Task Group.21.15
USS Block Island	United States Navy	Bogue-class escort carrier	Task Group.21.16
USS Bulmer	United States Navy	Clemson-class destroyer	Task Group.21.16
USS Barker	United States Navy	Clemson-class destroyer	Task Group.21.16
USS Paul Jones	United States Navy	Clemson-class destroyer	Task Group.21.16
USS Parrott	United States Navy	Clemson-class destroyer	Task Group.21.16

==== Task Force 41 ====
TF.41. Surface Patrol Force
Name	Flag	Type	Notes
USS Omaha	United States Navy	Omaha-class cruiser	Task Group 41.1
USS Jouett	United States Navy	Somers-class destroyer	Task Group 41.1
USS Cincinnati	United States Navy	Omaha-class cruiser	Task Group 41.2
USS Davis	United States Navy	Somers-class destroyer	Task Group 41.2
USS Milwaukee	United States Navy	Omaha-class cruiser	Task Group 41.3
USS Moffett	United States Navy	Porter-class destroyer	Task Group 41.3
USS Marblehead	United States Navy	Omaha-class cruiser	Task Group 41.4
Winslow	United States Navy	O'Brien-class destroyer	Task Group 41.4
USS Memphis	United States Navy	Omaha-class cruiser	Task Group 41.5
USS Somers	United States Navy	Somers-class destroyer	Task Group 41.5

=== Royal Navy ===
Royal Navy
Name	Flag	Type	Notes
HMS Fencer	Royal Navy	Attacker-class escort carrier	
HMS Striker	Royal Navy	Attacker-class escort carrier	
HMS Hurricane	Royal Navy	H-class destroyer	Sunk by U-415

- Royal Navy Escort Group B1
- Royal Navy Escort Group B4
- Royal Canadian Navy 4 corvettes

==== Operation Stonewall (Plymouth Command) ====
Force 3
Name	Flag	Type	Notes
HMS Glasgow	Royal Navy	Town-class cruiser	
HMNZS Gambia	Royal New Zealand Navy	Fiji-class cruiser	
HMS Enterprise	Royal Navy	Emerald-class cruiser	
HMS Penelope	Royal Navy	Arethusa-class cruiser	
HMS Ariadne	Royal Navy	Abdiel-class minelayer	Fast minelayer
French destroyer Le Fantasque	Free French Naval Forces	Le Fantasque-class destroyer	Later reclassified as a light cruiser
French destroyer Le Malin	Free French Naval Forces	Le Fantasque-class destroyer	Later reclassified as a light cruiser

==== Coastal Command ====
Coastal Command squadrons
Sqn	Flag	Group	Type	Notes
86 Squadron	Royal Air Force	19 Group	Liberator	Very Long Range ASW
201 Squadron	Royal Air Force	15 Group	Sunderland	Flying boat ASW
248 Squadron	Royal Air Force	19 Group	Beaufighter	Heavy fighter
254 Squadron	Royal Air Force	19 Group	Torbeau	torpedo-bomber
311 (Czech) Squadron	Royal Air Force	19 Group	Liberator GR Mk V	(Czech Republic) Very Long Range ASW aircraft 'H'
422 Squadron	Royal Canadian Air Force	15 Group	Sunderland	Flying boat ASW
461 Squadron	Royal Australian Air Force	19 Group	Sunderland	Flying boat ASW
502 Squadron	Royal Air Force	19 Group	Halifax GR.Mk.II	Long range reconnaissance

- Royal Air Force Fighter Command
  - Typhoon fighter escorts
- Royal Air Force Bomber Command
  - Stirling minelayers

==== Operation Freecar ====
Freecar
Ship	Flag	Type	Notes
HMS Corfu	Royal Navy	Armed merchant cruiser	Converted Royal Mail Ship
HMS Cilicia	Royal Navy	Armed merchant cruiser	Converted liner
Suffren	Free French Naval Forces	Heavy cruiser	
Luigi di Savoia Duca degli Abruzzi	Italy	Condottieri-class cruiser	Italian Co-belligerent Navy
Emanuele Filiberto Duca d'Aosta	Italy	Condottieri-class cruiser	Italian Co-belligerent Navy

=== Operation Barrier ===
- United States Navy
- Brazilian Air Force

=== Neutrals ===
- Ireland Kerlogue
- Spanish Navy 6 destroyers

== German order of battle ==
=== Blockade-runners ===
German blockade runners
Name	Year	Flag	GRT	Notes
MV Osorno	1938	Nazi Germany	6,951	Scuttled, Gironde estuary
MV Alsterufer	1939	Nazi Germany	2,729	Hit by rockets, 27 December 1943, NW Cape Finisterre, scuttled 46°40'N, 19°30'W

=== Befehlshaber der U-Boote ===
Gruppe Borkum
Name	Flag	Type	Notes
U-107	Kriegsmarine	Type IXB submarine	
U-270	Kriegsmarine	Type VIIC submarine	
U-275	Kriegsmarine	Type VIIC submarine	
U-305	Kriegsmarine	Type VIIC submarine	
U-382	Kriegsmarine	Type VIIC submarine	
U-415	Kriegsmarine	Type VIIC submarine	
U-505	Kriegsmarine	Type IXC submarine	
U-510	Kriegsmarine	Type IXB submarine	
U-541	Kriegsmarine	Type IXC/40 submarine	
U-618	Kriegsmarine	Type VIIC submarine	
U-641	Kriegsmarine	Type VIIC submarine	
U-645	Kriegsmarine	Type VIIC submarine	Sunk
U-667	Kriegsmarine	Type VIIC submarine	
U-801	Kriegsmarine	Type IXC/40 submarine	
U-962	Kriegsmarine	Type VIIC submarine	

=== Marinegruppe West ===
Kriegsmarine ships
Name	Flag	Type	Notes
German destroyer Z27	Kriegsmarine	Type 1936A-class destroyer	8th Destroyer flotilla, sunk
German destroyer Z23	Kriegsmarine	Type 1936A-class destroyer	8th Destroyer flotilla
German destroyer Z24	Kriegsmarine	Type 1936A-class destroyer	8th Destroyer flotilla
German destroyer Z32	Kriegsmarine	Type 1936A-class destroyer	8th Destroyer flotilla
German destroyer Z37	Kriegsmarine	Type 1936A (Mob) destroyer	8th Destroyer flotilla
German destroyer ZH1	Kriegsmarine	Gerard Callenburgh-class destroyer	Ex-Royal Netherlands Navy, Operation Bernau only
German torpedo boat T22	Kriegsmarine	Type 39 torpedo boat	4th Torpedo Boat flotilla
German torpedo boat T23	Kriegsmarine	Type 39 torpedo boat	4th Torpedo Boat flotilla (sunk)
German torpedo boat T24	Kriegsmarine	Type 39 torpedo boat	4th Torpedo Boat flotilla (sunk)
German torpedo boat T25	Kriegsmarine	Type 39 torpedo boat	4th Torpedo Boat flotilla
German torpedo boat T26	Kriegsmarine	Type 39 torpedo boat	4th Torpedo Boat flotilla
German torpedo boat T27	Kriegsmarine	Type 39 torpedo boat	4th Torpedo Boat flotilla

=== Fliegerführer Atlantik ===
Fliegerführer Atlantik
Unit	Arm	Type	Role
II./Kampfgeschwader 40	Luftwaffe	Heinkel He 177	Anti-shipping
III./Kampfgeschwader 40	Luftwaffe	Focke-Wulf Fw 200	Anti-shipping
5./Kampfgeschwader 40	Luftwaffe	Junkers Ju 88 C-6	Anti-shipping
2./Fernaufklärungsgruppe 5 Atlantik	Luftwaffe	Junkers Ju 290	Long-range reconnaissance
1.(F)./Seeaufklärungsgruppe 129	Luftwaffe	Blohm & Voss BV 222	Flying boat

== Bibliography ==
- Blair, Clay (2000) [1998]. Hitler's U-Boat War: The Hunted 1942–1945. Vol. II. London: Cassell. ISBN 0-304-35261-6.
- Brice, Martin (1981). Axis Blockade Runners of World War II. London: B. T. Batsford. ISBN 0-7134-2686-1.
- Forsyth, Robert (2017). Shadow over the Atlantic: The Luftwaffe and the U-boats: 1943–45 (pdf ed.). Oxford: Osprey. ISBN 978-1-4728-2046-4.
- Hague, Arnold (2000). The Allied Convoy System 1939–1945. London: Chatham. ISBN 1-86176-147-3.
- Hinsley, F. H.; Thomas, E. E.; Ransom, C. F. G.; Knight, R. C. (1984). British Intelligence in the Second World War, Its Influence on Strategy and Operations (Part I). History of the Second World War. Vol. III (1st ed.). London: HMSO. ISBN 0-11-630935-0.
- Jordan, Roger W. (2006) [1999]. The World's Merchant Fleets 1939: The Particulars and Wartime Fates of 6,000 Ships (2nd ed.). London: Chatham/Lionel Leventhal. ISBN 978-1-86176-293-1.
- Koop, Gerhard; Schmolke, Klaus-Peter (2014) [2003]. German Destroyers of World War II. Translated by Brooks, Geoffrey (Repr. Eng. trans. ed.). Barnsley: Seaforth Publishing, Pen & Sword. ISBN 978-1-84832-193-9. Translated from Die deutschen Zerstörer 1939–1945 Bernard & Graefe Verlag, Bonn (1995). Originally published in English by Greenhill books, Lionel Leventhal (2003)
- Kroener, Bernhard R.; Müller, Rolf-Dieter; Umbreit, Hans (2003) [1999]. Organization and Mobilization of the German Sphere of Power: Part 2 Wartime administration, economy and manpower resources1942–1944/5. Germany and the Second World War. Vol. V. Translated by Cook-Radmore, Derry; Osers, Ewald; Smerin, Barry; Wilson, Barbara (Eng. trans. Clarendon Press, Oxford ed.). Stuttgart: Deutsche-Verlags-Anstalt GMBH for Militärgeschichtliches Forschungsamt (Research Institute for Military History) Potsdam, Germany. ISBN 0-19-820873-1.
  - Müller, Rolf-Dieter. "Part II Albert Speer and Armaments Policy in Total War, III Basic Conditions of Wartime Production, and Civilian Factors. 4, Organization and Exploitation of 'Fortress Europe'. (c) The Decline in Wartime Foreign Trade (xiii) Japan". In Kroener, Müller & Umbreit (2003).
- McKinstry, Leo (2023). Cinderella Boys: The Forgotten RAF Force that Won the Battle of the Atlantic (e-book ed.). London: John Murray. ISBN 978-1-5293-1938-5.
- Morison, Samuel (1956). The Battle of the Atlantic Won: May 1943 – May 1945. History of United States Naval Operations in World War II. Vol. X. Boston: Little, Brown and Co. LCCN 47-1571. OCLC 459673176 – via Archive Foundation.
- Nesbit, Roy Conyers (2000) [1997]. RAF Coastal Command in Action 1939–1945 (repr. Budding Books, Stroud ed.). Cheltenham: Sutton Publishing. ISBN 1-84015-112-9.
- O'Hara, Vincent P. (2004). The German Fleet at War, 1939–1945. Annapolis, Maryland: Naval Institute Press. ISBN 1-59114-651-8.
- Rohwer, Jürgen; Hümmelchen, Gerhard (2005). Chronology of the War at Sea 1939–1945: The Naval History of World War Two (3rd rev. ed.). Annapolis, Maryland: Naval Institute Press. ISBN 1-59114-119-2.
- Roskill, S. W. (1957) [1954]. Butler, J. R. M. (ed.). The War at Sea 1939–1945: The Defensive. History of the Second World War United Kingdom Military Series. Vol. I (4th impr. ed.). London: HMSO. OCLC 881709135. Archived from the original on 27 February 2022.
- Roskill, S. W. (1962) [1957]. The War at Sea 1939–1945: The Period of Balance. History of the Second World War. Vol. II (3rd impr. ed.). London: HMSO. OCLC 174453986 – via Hyperwar.
- Roskill, Stephen (1960). Butler, J. R. M. (ed.). The War at Sea 1939–1945: The Offensive Part I 1st June 1943 – 31st May 1944. History of the Second World War United Kingdom Military Series. Vol. III. London: HMSO. OCLC 987392618.
- Saunders, H. St George (1975) [1954]. Royal Air Force 1939–45: The Fight is Won. Vol. III (pbk. repr. HMSO ed.). London: HMSO. ISBN 978-0-11-771594-3.
- Vančata, Pavel (2013). 311 Squadron. Sandomierz: Stratus, for Mushroom Model Publications. ISBN 978-83-61421-43-6.
- Waters, S. D. (1956). "Chapter 23, The New Zealand Cruisers". Royal New Zealand Navy (online scan). The Official History of New Zealand in the Second World War 1939–1945 (New Zealand Electronic Text Collection ed.). Wellington: Historical Publications Branch. pp. 352–356. OCLC 173284131.
- Whitley, M. J. (1983). Destroyer!: German Destroyers in World War II. London: Arms & Armour Press. ISBN 978-0-85368-258-5.
