= HMS Emerald (D66) =

Emerald-class light cruiser of the Royal Navy

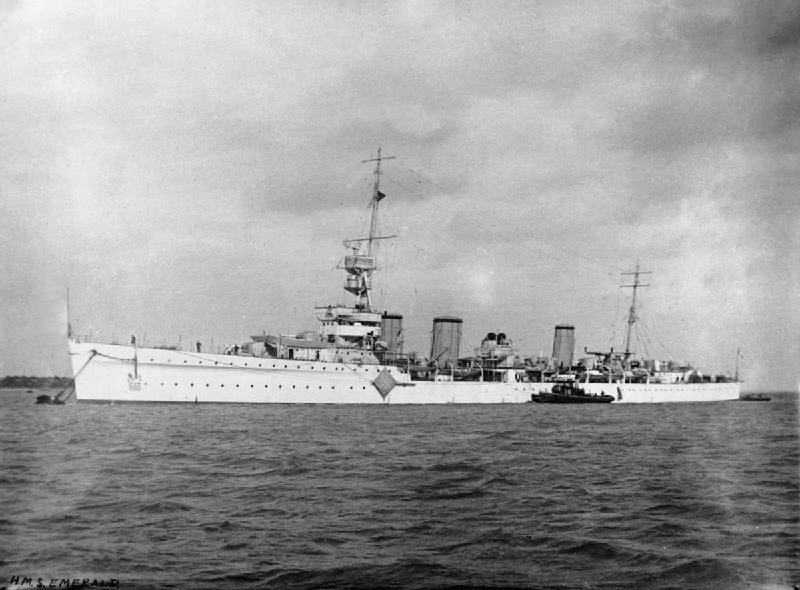
- Emerald at anchor

History

United Kingdom
- Name: Emerald
- Builder: Armstrong Whitworth, Newcastle-on-Tyne
- Laid down: 23 September 1918
- Launched: 19 May 1920
- Commissioned: 14 January 1926
- Decommissioned: 9 June 1948
- Out of service: 15 July 1933
- Reclassified: In reserve between 1937 and 1939; In reserve between 1945 and 1947
- Identification: Pennant number: 66 (Jan 26); I.66 (1936); D.66 (1940)
- Fate: Sunk as a target in 24 October 1947, scrapped in July 5 1948

General characteristics
- Class & type: Emerald-class light cruiser
- Displacement: 7,580 long tons (7,700 t) standard; 9,435 long tons (9,586 t) (full load)
- Length: 570 ft (173.7 m)
- Beam: 54.5 ft (16.6 m)
- Draught: 16.5 ft (5.0 m)
- Installed power: Eight boilers; 80,000 shp (60,000 kW)
- Propulsion: 4 shafts; geared steam turbines
- Speed: 33 knots (61 km/h; 38 mph)
- Range: 1,350 nautical miles (2,500 km; 1,550 mi) at 32 knots (59 km/h; 37 mph); 8,000 nautical miles (15,000 km; 9,200 mi) at 15 knots (28 km/h; 17 mph)
- Complement: 572 officers and ratings
- Armament: Original configuration: 7 × single BL 6 in (150 mm) Mk XII guns; 4 × 3-pounder (47 mm) "pom-pom" guns; 3 × single 4 in (100 mm) anti-aircraft guns; 4 × 21 in (533 mm) quadruple torpedo tubes.; August 1939: 7 × 6 in (152 mm) single guns, 2 × quadruple 0.5 in MG guns, 4 × 3 pdr (47 mm) pom-pom single guns, 4 × 21 inch (533 mm) quadruples torpedo tubes.; April 1943: 5 × 6 in (152 mm) single guns, 2 × 2 pdr (37 mm/40 mm) pom-poms quad guns, 4 × 3 pdr (47 mm) pom-pom single guns, 6 × 20 mm (0.8 in) dual power-operated guns, 4 × 21 in (533 mm) quadruples torpedo tubes.; April 1944: 5 × 6 in (152 mm) single guns, 2 × 2 pdr (37 mm/40 mm) pom-poms quad guns, 4 × 3 pdr (47 mm) pom-pom single guns, 6 × 20 mm (0.8 in) single guns, 6 × 20 mm (0.8 in) dual power-operated guns, 4 × 21 in (533 mm) quadruples torpedo tubes.
- Armour: Original configuration; Side: 3 in (76 mm) (amidships), Side: 2.5–1.5 in (64–38 mm) (bow), Side: 2 in (51 mm) (stern), Deck: 1 in (25 mm)
- Aircraft carried: One aircraft with one catapult; Catapult later removed. A Fairey Seafox was carried in the early days of World War II

HMS Emerald was an Emerald-class light cruiser of the Royal Navy. She was built by Armstrong at Newcastle-on-Tyne, with the keel being laid down on 23 September 1918. She was launched on 19 May 1920 and commissioned 14 January 1926.

== History ==
Emerald went out to the East Indies, 4th Cruiser Squadron, on commissioning, finally returning home to pay off on 15 July 1933. On 1 March 1926 she arrived off Jeddah and was visited by Ibn Saud, who took tea with her captain and was presented with a clock by the captain and the wardroom officers. During her time in the far east she participated as part of a Royal Navy flotilla in the 1927 Nanking Incident, helping to protect British and other international citizens and business interests. After a refit at Chatham, the ship recommissioned for the East Indies again on 31 August 1934, which tour lasted until September 1937, on relief by Liverpool. On her return home she paid off to reserve.

Recommissioned for war service, she joined the 12th Cruiser Squadron on Northern Patrol duties in September 1939. However, the appearance of German raiders in the Atlantic resulted in her transfer to Halifax in October to escort homeward-bound convoys, where she remained into 1940. During the early part of the war, until May 1940, her captain was the noted officer Augustus Agar, V.C. On 24 June 1940 Emerald departed Greenock carrying £58 million in gold, and reached Halifax on 1 July where the gold was transferred to a Canadian National Railway train for safe storage in Canada until the threat of German invasion of England had passed. Her sister ship Enterprise shipped another £10 million for Operation Fish.

In 1941 Emerald was transferred to the Indian Ocean, where she escorted troop convoys to the Middle East and stood by in the Persian Gulf during the operations in Iraq in April 1941. After Japan's entry into the war, in December 1941, Emerald joined the Eastern Fleet as part of the 'Fast Group', and in March 1942 was flagship.

For the period 30 December 1941 to 13 January 1942 HMS Emerald was an escort for convoy DM 1. At 1000 on 30 December 1941, about 370 miles east of Mombasa, convoy WS12ZM (Malaya) (P&O's SS Narkunda, MV Aorangi, P&O's MV Sussex, and MS Abbekerk) detaches from convoys WS12ZA (Aden) and WS12ZB (Bombay), and with USS Mount Vernon and escort HMS Emerald form convoy DM 1 (Durban Malaya). Convoy DM 1 reaches ‘Port T’ – Addu Atoll in the Maldives at 1000 on 4 January 1942. On 11 January 1942, the convoy passes through the Sunda Strait. On 12 January 1942, the convoy passes through the Bangka Strait. On 13 January 1942, convoy DM 1 arrives in Singapore

In August 1942 the ship returned home to refit at Portsmouth, and did not return to service until early April 1943.

She rejoined the Eastern Fleet, 4th Cruiser Squadron, for escort duties, then returned home once more for the Invasion of Normandy, when she served with Force "K" in support of Gold Beach. By January 1945 Emerald had joined the reserve fleet and, in 1947, was allocated for ship target trials. As a result of these trials the ship foundered in Kames Bay, Rothesay, on 24 October, and was not refloated until 9 June 1948, after which she was docked, examined, and then handed over to BISCO on 23 June 1948 for breaking up. She was scrapped at Arnott Young (Troon, Scotland) where she arrived on 5 July 1948.

== See also ==
- Augustus Agar

== Bibliography ==
- Brown, David K. (1997). "Re: E's and Super Es". Warship International. XXXIV (1): 7–8. ISSN 0043-0374.
- Brown, David K. (1987). Lambert, Andrew (ed.). "Ship Trials: Tests Against Cruisers". Warship (42): 106–108. ISSN 0142-6222.
- Colledge, J. J.; Warlow, Ben (2006) [1969]. Ships of the Royal Navy: The Complete Record of All Fighting Ships of the Royal Navy from the 15th Century to the Present (3rd Rev ed.). London: Chatham Publishing. ISBN 978-1-86176-281-8. OCLC 67375475.
- Friedman, Norman (2010). British Cruisers: Two World Wars and After. Barnsley, UK: Seaforth Publishing. ISBN 978-1-59114-078-8.
- McBride, K. D. (1996). "Es and Super-Es". Warship International. XXXIII (3): 257–278. ISSN 0043-0374.
- Rohwer, Jürgen (2005). Chronology of the War at Sea 1939–1945: The Naval History of World War Two (Third Revised ed.). Annapolis, Maryland: Naval Institute Press. ISBN 1-59114-119-2.
- Whitley, M. J. (1995). Cruisers of World War Two: An International Encyclopedia. London: Cassell. ISBN 1-86019-874-0.
- Woodbridge, W. D. (1997). "Re: E's and Super Es". Warship International. XXXIV (1): 8. ISSN 0043-0374.
- Operation Fish, by Alfred Draper, General Publishing, Don Mills, Ontario, Canada, 1979
