= Ian Fraser (Royal Navy pilot) =

Ian Fraser OBE DSC
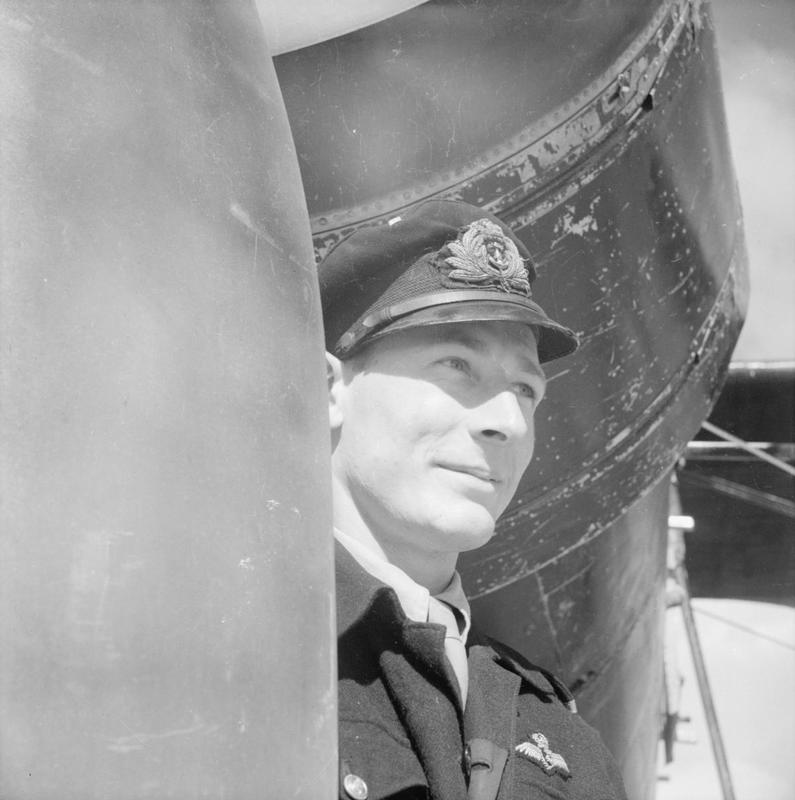
- Fraser in Malta during the Second World War
- Born: Ian Duncan Fraser; 9 November 1918
- Died: 7 March 2015
- Military career
- Allegiance: United Kingdom
- Branch: Royal Navy
- Rank: Lieutenant
- Conflicts: World War II
- Other work: Colonial Official

Ian Duncan Fraser OBE DSC (9 November 1918 – 7 March 2015) was a Royal Navy officer and pilot, who served with distinction in the Mediterranean Theatre in World War II, particularly in the fighting around Malta. Fraser was awarded the Distinguished Service Cross (DSC) for bravery while attacking enemy shipping, including disabling the Italian light cruiser Luigi di Savoia Duca degli Abruzzi with a torpedo. Fraser was also involved in the dangerous work of dropping mines in enemy harbours, and twice survived being shot down.

After the war, Fraser was a Colonial Service official, notably in Singapore as it moved towards independence.

== Early life ==
Ian Fraser was born in Solihull in the West Midlands on 11 September 1921. His father was a priest and originally from Scotland. He was schooled at Marlborough College, then Christ Church, Oxford where he was an undergraduate reading history when the Second World War broke out. Fraser volunteered for the Royal Navy.

== Service in World War II ==
=== Training ===
Fraser became a Naval Airman 2nd Class at HMS St Vincent in Gosport, which after the outbreak of war had become an officer training establishment for the Fleet Air Arm (FAA). During 1940, he learned to fly at RAF Elmdon, which was built as a civilian airport (now part of Birmingham Airport), but for the duration of the war was taken over by the Air Ministry and used as an Elementary Flying Training School for the RAF and FAA. Fraser was commissioned as an officer in the Royal Navy Volunteer Reserve, then trained as a torpedo bomber pilot and taught how to take-off from, and land on, an aircraft carrier. However, rather than serving on an aircraft carrier, Fraser was loaned to the Royal Air Force (RAF) where he flew the land-based Beaufighter fighter-bomber with No. 252 Squadron, RAF Coastal Command.

=== Active Service in the Mediterranean ===
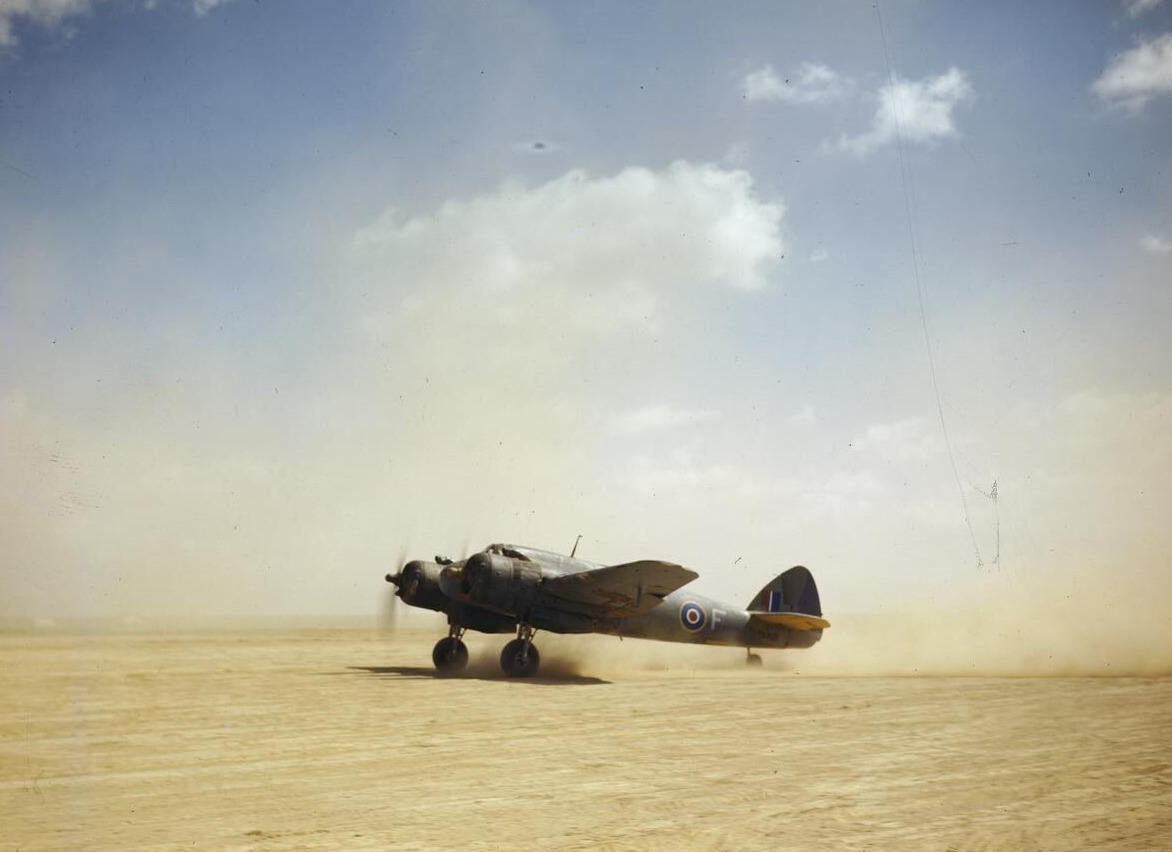
Bristol Beaufighter Mk.1 of RAF No. 252 Squadron (in which Fraser served as a pilot) in North Africa.

In May 1941, Fraser arrived in Malta where he helped to shoot down an Axis transport aircraft, before being sent to the Western Desert Campaign, where he was shot down and spent three days wounded and sheltering beneath the wreckage of his aircraft before being rescued. Fraser was treated in a hospital in Suez, where he was initially viewed as close to death and nearly had an arm amputated. Fraser was then sent to South Africa to recover, then returned to Britain and learned to fly again.

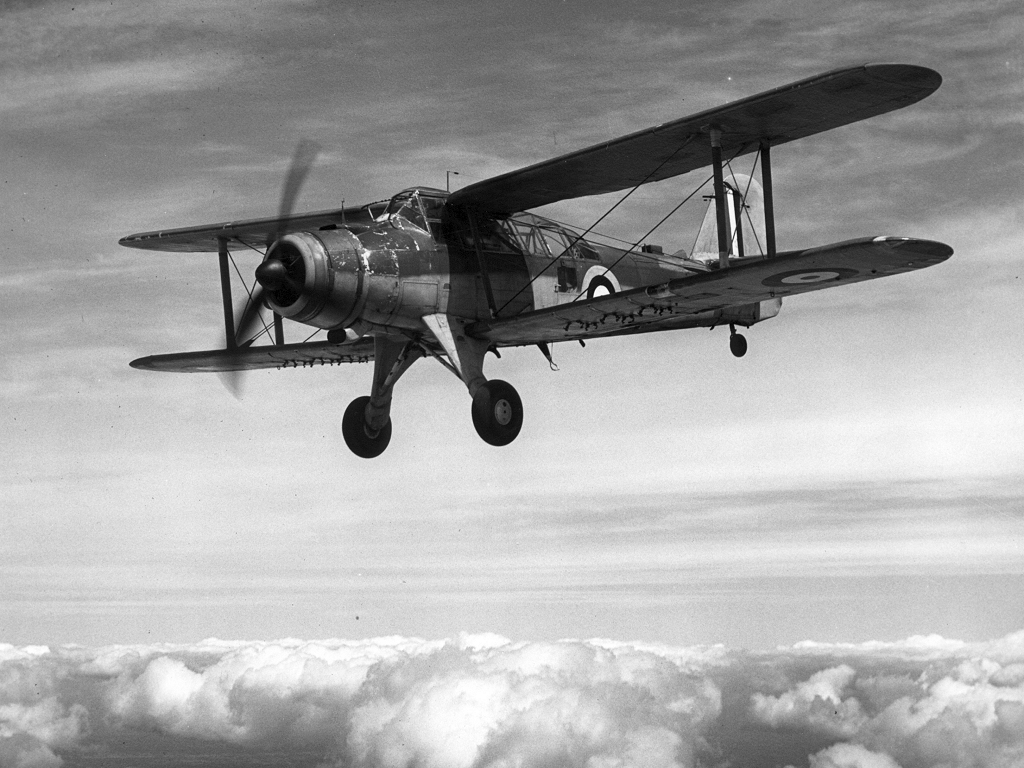
A Fairey Albacore torpedo bomber in flight during World War II.

Back with the FAA, Fraser was again posted to Malta in 1942 as a pilot in 830 Naval Air Squadron (NAS). In the North Africa campaign, Malta was a base from which British aircraft, ships and submarines attacked Axis convoys shipping supplies and re-enforcements from Italy to Libya. The pressure on the Axis supply lines from British forces on Malta played an important role in wearing down the effectiveness of Erwin Rommel's Panzerarmee. Malta had been besieged and subjected to many Axis air raids since 1940. Malta's supply situation had become desperate and 830 NAS operated in Spartan conditions on an island that was in the midst of a battle that has been called 'The Verdun of the Mediterranean'. In the face of heavy combat damage to aeroplanes and shortages, on their aerodrome at RAF Hal Far, 830 NAS’s ground crews had to perform "miracles of improvisation" to keep aircraft flying.

With 830 NAS, Fraser flew Albacore torpedo bombers, which could operate from land or an aircraft carrier, and were also used for reconnaissance, dive-bombing and laying naval mines. The Albacore was a biplane and obsolescent; although just a year earlier, in the eastern Mediterranean, Albacores from the aircraft carrier, HMS Formidable had badly damaged the modern Italian battleship, Vittorio Veneto, at the Battle of Cape Matapan. Pilots compensated for the Albacore's shortcomings with their flying skills and courage.

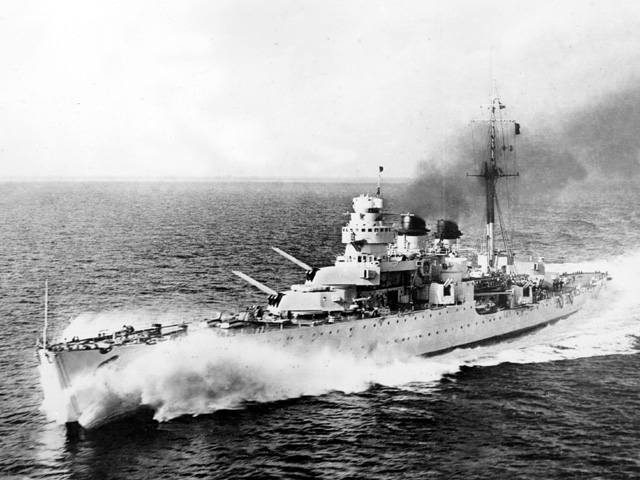
The Italian Light Cruiser Luigi di Savoia Duca degli Abruzzi, which Fraser torpedoed in November 1942.

On 22 November 1942, Fraser carried out a night attack on three Italian navy cruisers off the coast of Calabria. He released his torpedoes at a range of 500 yd (460 m), that struck the light cruiser Luigi di Savoia Duca degli Abruzzi. Flying at an altitude of 30 ft (9.1 m), Fraser later said he was more concerned about hitting the mast of one of the ships than by the anti-aircraft fire from the ships. Duca degli Abruzzi was badly damaged and saw no further action before Italy defected from the Axis in September 1943. It later saw service with the Allied Italian Co-belligerent Navy. Fraser flew at the limit of his aircraft's range and had to return immediately after the attack, so only discovered how successful he had been thanks to Allied intelligence reports.

On 22 December 1942, west of Sicily, near the island of Marettimo, Fraser piloted one of four FAA torpedo-bombers that attacked a 2,638 GRT Italian cargo ship, the Etruria, which was escorted by three Axis destroyers, plus some gunboats. Kenneth Poolman wrote, "with the smell of some very close flak in his nostrils, Fraser dropped his torpedo. An explosion and a huge mushroom of black and white smoke rose from abaft the ship's funnel, and she was soon burning. The Etruria was later announced sunk by the BBC". A torpedo dropped by one of the other FAA aircraft struck a destroyer.

Fraser was awarded the DSC. The decoration was reported in the London Gazette on 29 June 1943, which said the award was "for bravery in successful air-attacks on enemy shipping in the Mediterranean".

Fraser's squadron began to mine Axis harbours, flying 10 ft (3.0 m) above the water on moonless nights, which Fraser described as "more nerve-racking and dangerous than attacking ships". In March 1943, Fraser completed his tour and had the option to return to Britain and become a training instructor but he volunteered to serve another tour.

=== Prisoner of War ===
On 30 March 1943, Fraser's aircraft was hit by flak over Palermo, Sicily, rupturing the fuel tank and he had to ditch in the sea. Fraser, and his crewman, Midshipman Michael Barbour, were adrift in a dinghy for days before they were rescued by a German patrol boat. Barbour, who was just 19 years old, died shortly after they were rescued. Fraser spent the rest of the war as a prisoner of war. He was the held in Stalag Luft III, the camp where the Great Escape occurred in March 1944. During this escape attempt, Fraser served as a lookout. Fraser finished the war as a Lieutenant. His brother, Gordon, also served in the FAA but was lost over the North Sea in poor weather conditions in September 1942.

== Post-war Career ==
After the war, Fraser joined the British Colonial Service and served in Malaya, Aden, the Bahamas and Singapore. He became Acting Permanent Secretary in Singapore in 1960, during the period the colony was moving towards independence, for which he was made an Officer of the Order of the British Empire (OBE) in the 1961 New Year Honours list.

== See also ==
- Battle of the Mediterranean
- Andrew Cunningham, 1st Viscount Cunningham of Hyndhope
- Gartrell Parker - flying ace and former-830 Squadron pilot
- List of Fleet Air Arm battle honours
- Royal Navy during the Second World War

== Sources ==
- "Ian Fraser, naval pilot - obituary." Daily Telegraph, 16 April 2015. https://www.telegraph.co.uk/news/obituaries/11542578/Ian-Fraser-naval-pilot-obituary.html
- Konstam, Angus (2023). Cape Matapan 1941: Cunningham's Mediterranean Triumph. Oxford: Osprey Publishing. ISBN 978-1-4728-5723-1.
- Konstam, Angus (2025). Second Sirte 1942: The Desperate Battle to Relieve Malta. Oxford: Osprey Publishing. ISBN 978-1-4728-6722-3.
- London Gazette, Supplement, 29 June 1943. https://www.thegazette.co.uk/London/issue/36072/supplement/2946/data.pdf
- Moorehead, Alan (2012) [1944]. The Desert War: The Classic Trilogy on the North African Campaign 1940–43 (Autumn Press (Kindle e-book) ed.). London: Hamish Hamilton. ISBN 978-1-78-131106-6.
- Poolman, Kenneth (1980). Night Strike From Malta: 830 Squadron RN and Rommel's Convoys. London: Jane's Publishing Company. ISBN 978-0-71-060003-5.
- "Ian Fraser. Pilot who torpedoed an Italian Cruiser in 1942." The Times, 19 June 2015. https://www.thetimes.com/travel/destinations/europe-travel/italy/ian-fraser-c69f7k6wqt8
