= FV Empire Fisher =

History
- Name: Herrlichkeit (1922–40); Empire Fisher (1940–52)
- Owner: Nordsee Deutsche Hochsee Fischerei Bremen-Cuxhaven AG (1922–40); Ministry of War Transport (1940–45); Ministry of Transport (1945–48); Hunter Fishing Co (1948–52); J Sweeney (1952)
- Operator: Nordsee Deutsche Hochsee Fischerei Bremen-Cuxhaven AG (1922–40); H Markham Cook (1940–44); Boston Deep Sea Fishing & Ice Co Ltd. (1944–48); R Souza (1948–50); G Hunter (1950–52); J Sweeney (1952)
- Port of registry: (Weimar Republic) Cuxhaven, Germany (1922–33); (German Empire) Cuxhaven (1933–35); (Germany) Cuxhaven (1935–40); London, United Kingdom (1940–48); (United Kingdom) Leith (1948–52); (Republic of Ireland) Dublin, Ireland (1952)
- Builder: Reiherstieg Schiffswerfte & Maschinenfabrik
- Yard number: 549
- Launched: 29 June 1922
- Out of service: 1952
- Identification: United Kingdom Official Number 167620 (1940-52); Fishing registration LO 315 (1940–48); Fishing registration LH 251 (1948–52); Fishing registration D 315 (1952); Code Letters RCQV (1922–34); Code Letters DHLN (1934–40); Code Letters MJSL (1940-52)
- Fate: Scrapped

General characteristics
- Class & type: Trawler
- Tonnage: 235 GRT (1922–28), 268 GRT (1928–48), 284 GRT (1948–52); 105 NRT (1922–28), 105 NRT (1928–48), 120 NRT (1948–52)
- Length: 125 feet 8 inches (38.30 m) (1922–28), 140 feet 2 inches (42.72 m) (1928–52)
- Beam: 24 ft 2 in (7.37 m)
- Depth: 9 ft 6 in (2.90 m)
- Installed power: 58 nhp
- Propulsion: Triple expansion steam engine, single screw propeller

Empire Fisher was a 268 GRT trawler that was built as Herrlichkeit (English: Glory) in 1922 by Reiherstieg Schiffswerfte & Maschinenfabrik, Hamburg, Germany for the Nordsee Deutsche Hochsee Fischerei Bremen-Cuxhaven AG. She was captured in 1940 by HMS Glasgow, passed to the Ministry of War Transport (MoWT) and renamed Empire Fisher. She was sold in 1948. Sold for scrapping in 1952, she was resold to Ireland and scrapped later that year.

== Description ==
The ship was a trawler built in 1922 by Reiherstieg Schiffswerfte & Maschinenfabrik, Hamburg, Germany. She was yard number 549.

As built, the ship was 125 feet 8 inches (38.30 m) long, with a beam of 24 feet 2 inches (7.37 m). She had a depth of 9 feet 6 inches (2.90 m). She was assessed at 235 GRT, 90 NRT.

The ship was propelled by a 58 nhp triple expansion steam engine, which had cylinders of 13 inches (33 cm), 23 5/16 inches (59 cm) and 32 1/2 inches (83 cm) diameter by 25 5/16 inches (64 cm) stroke. The engine was built by Reiherstieg Schiffswerfte & Maschinenfabrik. It drove a single screw propeller.

== History ==
The ship was built by Reiherstieg Schiffswerfte & Maschinenfabrik, Hamburg in 1922 for the Nordsee Deutsche Hochsee Fischerei Bremen-Cuxhaven AG. She was launched on 29 June 1922. The Code Letters RCQV were allocated. Her port of registry was Cuxhaven. In 1928, the ship was lengthened to 140 feet 2 inches (42.72 m). She was now 268 GRT, 105 NRT. With the change in Code Letters in 1934, Herrlichkeit was allocated the Code Letters DHLN.

On 13 January 1940, Herrlichkeit was captured by off Tromsø, Norway (69°56′N 16°49′E) HMS Glasgow. She was taken under escort with the intention of putting into Aberdeen. Due to the poor condition of the ship, she was taken in tow by HMS Glasgow as the weather deteriorated and they put into Fraserburgh, Aberdeenshire on 17 January. Herrlichkeit arrived at Aberdeen on 21 January. Her crew were interned and the 80 tonnes of fish on board was sold. She was declared a prize of war. was passed to the MoWT and renamed Empire Fisher. The United Kingdom Official Number 167620 and Code Letters MJSL were allocated. She was placed under the management of H Markham Cook and her port of registry was London. The fishing registration LO 315 was allocated. By 1944, Empire Fisher was under the management of the Boston Deep Sea Fishery & Ice Co Ltd, Fleetwood, Lancashire.

Empire Fisher was sold on 3 February 1948 to the Hunter Fishing Co Ltd, Aberdeen and placed under the management of Robert Souza. On 26 February, she was registered at Leith, Lothian with the fishing registration LH 251. She was remeasured during 1948 and was now assessed at 284 GRT, 120 NRT. In 1950, management passed to George Hunter. Empire Fisher was laid up in 1952 at Granton, Edinburgh and stripped of usable parts. She was sold to the British Iron & Steel Corporation for scrapping, but was resold on 26 March 1952 to W J Sweeney, Achill Sound, County Mayo, Ireland. She was registered at Dublin with the fishing registration D 315. The ship was later scrapped by Haulbowline Industries Ltd Passage West, County Cork, Ireland.
