= Emerald-class cruiser =

Class of two light cruisers built for the Royal Navy

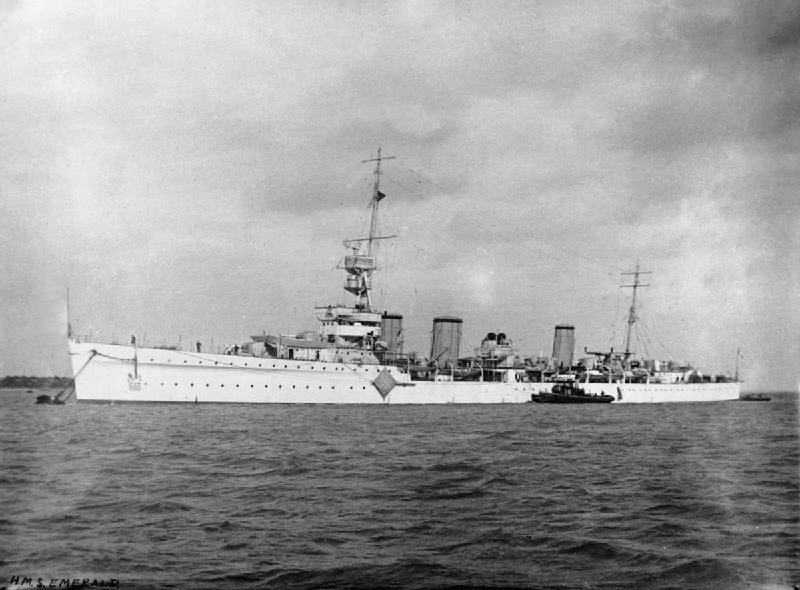
- Emerald

Class overview
- Name: Emerald class
- Builders: Armstrong Whitworth; John Brown
- Operators: Royal Navy
- Preceded by: Danae class
- Succeeded by: Leander class
- In commission: 1926–1948
- Planned: 3
- Completed: 2
- Cancelled: 1
- Retired: 2

General characteristics
- Type: Light cruiser
- Displacement: 7,580 long tons (7,700 t) (standard)
- Length: 570 ft (173.7 m)
- Beam: 54.5 ft (16.6 m)
- Draught: 16.5 ft (5.0 m)
- Installed power: 8 Yarrow boilers 80,000 shp (60,000 kW)
- Propulsion: 4 shafts; geared steam turbines
- Speed: 33 kn (61 km/h; 38 mph)
- Range: 8,000 nmi (15,000 km; 9,200 mi) at 15 kn (28 km/h; 17 mph)
- Complement: 572
- Armament: Emerald: 7 × single 6 in (152 mm) guns; Enterprise: 1 × twin, 5 × single 6 in (152 mm) guns; 3 × single 4 in (102 mm) AA guns; 2 × single 2 pdr (40 mm (1.6 in)) AA guns; 4 × quadruple 21 in (533 mm) torpedo tubes
- Armour: 1.5–3 in (38–76 mm); Deck: 1 in (25 mm)
- Aircraft carried: 1 × aircraft (later removed)
- Aviation facilities: 1 × catapult (later removed)

The Emerald class or E class was a class of two light cruisers built for the Royal Navy. Following the Cavendish class, three ships of a new class were ordered in March 1918, towards the end of World War I, designed to emphasise high speed at the cost of other qualities, for use against rumoured new high-speed German cruisers – like the Brummer class – and particularly minelayers, in the North Sea. The third ship was cancelled in November 1918.

== Design ==
The E class were based on the preceding Danae class, itself based on the C-class cruiser but had a very high ratio of length to beam and only one more gun, despite being much bigger and more expensive. Much was sacrificed to achieve 33 kn (61 km/h; 38 mph), the horsepower was doubled and the hull increased by 100 ft (30 m) in length, with a 50 per cent increase in displacement. Only two ships were built, being completed in 1926. Four propellers were necessary for the increased power and were driven from two engine rooms. There were four boiler rooms, nos. 2 and 3 being arranged side-by-side with the exhausts trunked into a common funnel. The magazines were between boiler rooms nos. 2 and 3 and the forward engine room and between boiler room no. 4 and the after engine room. This led to a bizarre funnel arrangement, accentuated further when in 1935 a longer catapult required the mainmast to be stepped forward of the after funnel and the funnels were heightened by 5 ft (1.5 m).

Enterprise was completed with a prototype twin 6 in (152 mm) turret in place of her two forward single mounts. The trials of the turret were successful and it was retained on Enterprise for the rest of her career. The turret design was later installed in the Leander, HMAS Perth and Arethusa classes. The turret installation occupied less space than the superimposed 'A' and 'B' guns of Emerald; the bridge was placed further forward. The bridge was of a new design, being a single block topped by a director tower, rather than the traditional platforms built around the foremast and wheelhouse topped with a spotting top. This design of bridge would appear in the County-class cruisers.

Notwithstanding their age and outlandish appearance, the two ships were the fastest cruisers in the Royal Navy at the outbreak of World War II, Emerald exceeding 32 kn (59 km/h; 37 mph) in a full-power trial at full load in 1939. Both cruisers also carried the heaviest torpedo armament of any Royal Navy cruiser – four quadruple mounts. These cruisers had a long range, unlike the C- and Danae-class cruisers, making them valuable for patrolling sea lanes against Axis merchant raiders. They were also large enough that they could accommodate significant additions to their anti-aircraft armament as well as modern radar suites.

== Modifications ==
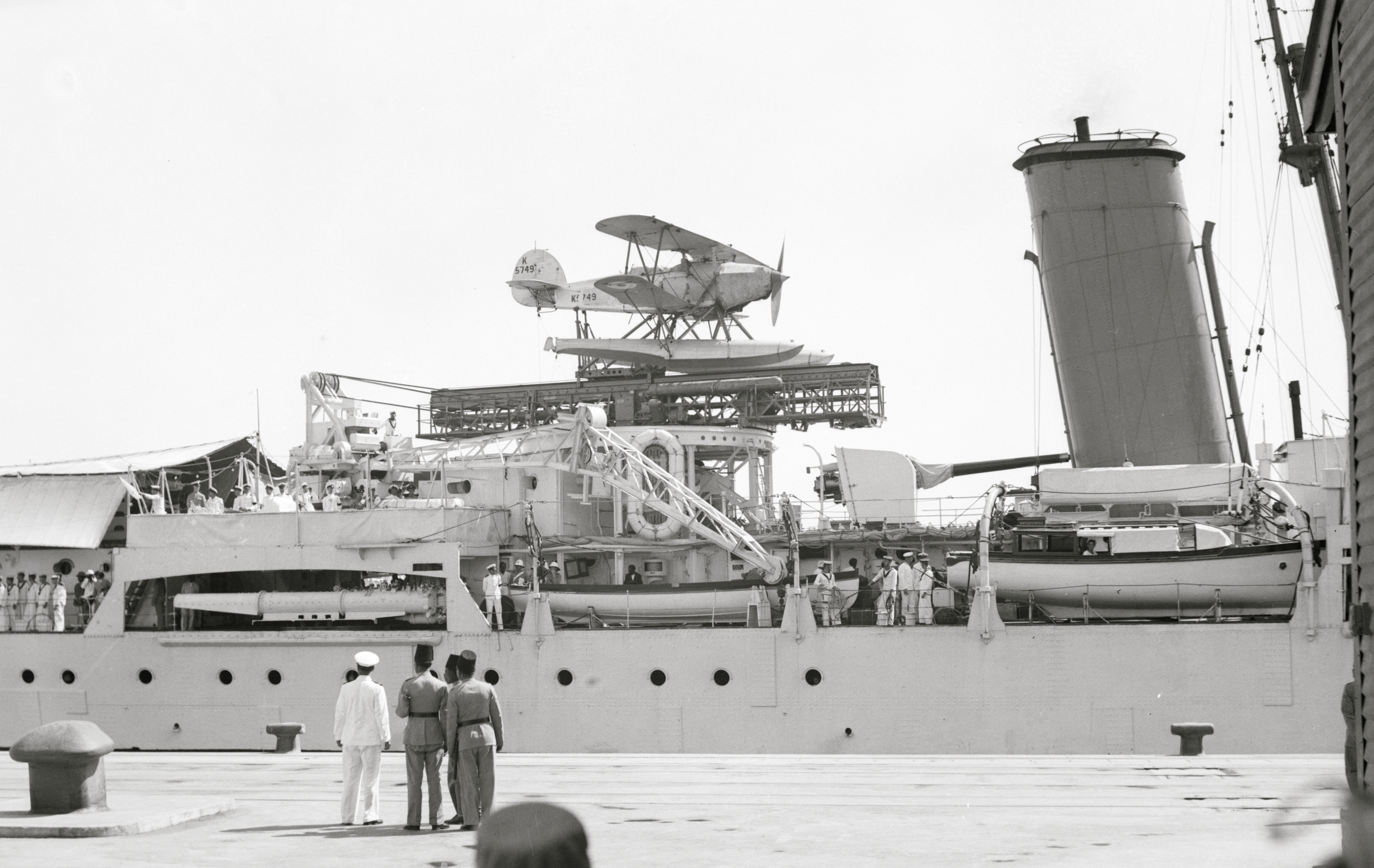
Hawker Osprey K5749 on Enterprise's catapult in May 1936

In the mid-1930s both ships were fitted with a catapult which replaced the outmoded flying-off platform and had HACS Mk.I added for the 4 in (102 mm) guns, which was fitted amidships between the searchlight platform and the after funnel. The funnels were raised 5 ft (1.5 m). Later proposals to increase the AA armament by the addition of twin 4-inch and multiple 2-pounder pom-poms were thwarted by the outbreak of war. Emerald had received two quadruple .5 machine guns before the war, then during refit between August 1942 and April 1943 she landed the after six inch, two 2-pounder singles and the .5 machine guns to receive instead six power-operated twin 20 mm (0.79 in) and two quadruple 2-pounder guns and radars Type 273 (centimetric target indication), 281 (air warning), 282 (pom-pom ranging) and 285 (HACS ranging). In April 1944 six 20 mm single mounts were added and the catapult was removed.

Enterprise landed two six-inch singles in 1941 and had one quadruple 2-pounder fitted. She later had four single 20 mm (0.79 in) fitted and then, in the course of a long refit between the end of December 1942 and October 1943, she lost the single 2-pounder and 20 mm (0.79 in) weapons, receiving six twin power-operated mountings in lieu. The two six-inch were reinstated and a second quadruple 2-pounder fitted. She was fitted with radars Type 272 (centimetric target indication), 281, 282, 284 (6-inch gun ranging), and 285. In February she had an additional four single 20 mm (0.79 in) fitted and the catapult was removed.

== Ships ==
Construction data
Name	Builder	Laid down	Launched	Completed	Fate
Emerald	Sir W. G. Armstrong, Whitworth and Company, Elswick	23 September 1918	19 May 1920	Chatham Royal Dockyard, January 1926	Sold for scrap, 23 June 1948
Enterprise	John Brown and Company, Clydebank	28 June 1918	23 December 1919	Devonport Royal Dockyard, April 1926	Sold for scrap, 11 April 1946
Euphrates	Fairfield Shipbuilding and Engineering Company, Govan	1918	—N/a	—N/a	Cancelled, 26 November 1918

== Service history ==
Like the Cavendish class, they were mainly employed on the ocean trade routes, also seeing fleet service in the Far East in 1942–1943 with the East Indies Fleet. Unlike almost all of the other older cruisers, both ships had active employment until the last few months of the war, in almost every theatre. Enterprise served in Force H in 1940 when that naval task force bombarded the French naval squadron in the Attack on Mers-el-Kébir in July 1940. Enterprise after her 1942–1943 refit served with the Home Fleet where, in company with the cruiser Glasgow, she participated in the Battle of the Bay of Biscay against a well-armed German destroyer and torpedo boat force in December 1943 in the Bay of Biscay. Emerald supported British forces in their campaign putting down the pro-German revolt in Iraq in the summer of 1941. Both cruisers provided gunfire support in the Invasion of Normandy in June 1944. Both cruisers were reduced to reserve by January 1945; Enterprise was reactivated for use in trooping duties upon the ending of the war.

== Bibliography ==
- Brown, David K. (1997). "Re: E's and Super Es". Warship International. XXXIV (1): 7–8. ISSN 0043-0374.
- Campbell, N. J. M. (1980). "Great Britain (including Empire Forces)". In Chesneau, Roger (ed.). Conway's All the World's Fighting Ships 1922–1946. Conway Maritime Press. pp. 2–85. ISBN 0-85177-146-7.
- Colledge, J. J.; Warlow, Ben (2006) [1969]. Ships of the Royal Navy: The Complete Record of All Fighting Ships of the Royal Navy from the 15th Century to the Present (3rd Rev ed.). London: Chatham Publishing. ISBN 978-1-86176-281-8. OCLC 67375475.
- Friedman, Norman (2010). British Cruisers: Two World Wars and After. Seaforth Publishing. ISBN 978-1-59114-078-8.
- Friedman, Norman (2011). Naval Weapons of World War One: Guns, Torpedoes, Mines and ASW Weapons of All Nations; An Illustrated Directory. Barnsley: Seaforth Publishing. ISBN 978-1-84832-100-7.
- Lenton, H. T. (1998). British & Empire Warships of the Second World War. Naval Institute Press. ISBN 1-55750-048-7.
- McBride, K. D. (1996). "Es and Super-Es". Warship International. XXXIII (3): 257–278. ISSN 0043-0374.
- Preston, Antony (1985). "Great Britain and Empire Forces". In Gray, Randal (ed.). Conway's All the World's Fighting Ships 1906–1921. Naval Institute Press. pp. 1–104. ISBN 0-85177-245-5.
- Raven, Alan & Roberts, John (1980). British Cruisers of World War Two. Naval Institute Press. ISBN 0-87021-922-7.
- Rohwer, Jürgen (2005). Chronology of the War at Sea 1939–1945: The Naval History of World War Two (3rd rev. ed.). Naval Institute Press. ISBN 1-59114-119-2.
- Whitley, M. J. (1995). Cruisers of World War Two: An International Encyclopaedia. Cassell. ISBN 1-86019-874-0.
- Woodbridge, W. D. (1997). "Re: E's and Super Es". Warship International. XXXIV (1): 8. ISSN 0043-0374.
