= HMS Ariadne (M65) =

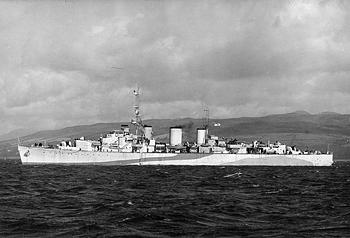

History

United Kingdom
- Name: HMS Ariadne
- Builder: Alexander Stephen and Sons, Glasgow
- Laid down: 15 Nov 1941
- Launched: 16 Feb 1943
- Commissioned: 9 Oct 1943
- Identification: Pennant number M65
- Fate: Scrapped in June 1965

General characteristics
- Class & type: Abdiel-class minelayer
- Displacement: 2,650 tons (standard); 4,000 tons (full load)
- Length: 418 ft (127 m)
- Beam: 40 ft (12 m)
- Draught: 16 ft (4.9 m)
- Propulsion: Two shafts; Geared turbines; four Admiralty 3-drum boilers; 72,000 shp
- Speed: 40 knots (74 km/h)
- Complement: 242
- Armament: 4 × 4-inch (100 mm) AA guns (2×2); 4 × Bofors 40 mm L/60 gun (2×2); 12 × Oerlikon 20 mm cannon (6×2); 160 Naval mines

HMS Ariadne was an Abdiel-class minelayer of the Royal Navy.

She was built by Alexander Stephen and Sons of Glasgow, Scotland. She was laid down on 15 November 1941, launched on 16 February 1943 and commissioned on 9 October 1943.

== Service history ==
Her first duty was to lay mines off the coast of Norway. She was also one of the ships taking part in Operation Stonewall. She then left Home waters in January 1944 to join the United States Seventh Fleet in the Pacific Ocean theatre of war. In June 1944 she laid 146 mines off the northern coast of New Guinea, and when landings were made in the Mapia Group of islands in November 1944, Ariadne was used to carry US Army soldiers. During her period of active service she laid 1,352 mines.

After the end of the war, Ariadne was used to repatriate British prisoners of war from Japan and as a mailship due to her speed. She was paid off into the Reserve Fleet at Sheerness, and did not see service again, apart from a short trial after a refit in the 1950s. This involved the replacement of her light anti-aircraft guns with more modern weapons. She was finally sold to W.H. Arnott Young for scrapping and arrived at Dalmuir in February 1965. She was then scrapped at Dalmuir and Troon in June 1965.
