= HMS Enterprise (D52) =

Emerald-class light cruiser of the Royal Navy

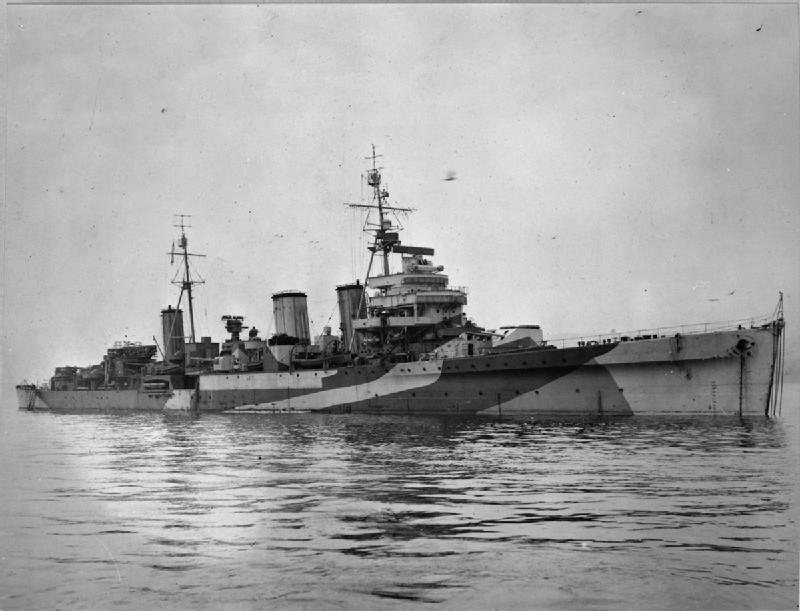
- Enterprise in November 1943

History

United Kingdom
- Name: Enterprise
- Builder: John Brown & Company, (Clydebank, Scotland)
- Yard number: 484
- Laid down: 28 June 1918
- Launched: 23 December 1919
- Commissioned: 7 April 1926
- Decommissioned: 13 January 1946
- Identification: Pennant number: 52 (Jan 26); I.52 (1936); D.52 (1940)
- Motto: Latin: Spes aspera levat, lit. 'Hope lightens difficulties'
- Honours and awards: Atlantic (1939–40); Norway (1940); Biscay (1943); Normandy (1944)
- Fate: Scrapped; Handed over to BISCO for scrapping 11 April 1946; Arrived at Cashmore's yard at Newport, Wales on 21 April 1946 for breaking up
- Badge: On a field red, a lion rampant under a star silver

General characteristics
- Class & type: Emerald-class light cruiser
- Displacement: 7,580 long tons (7,700 t); 9,435 long tons (9,586 t)
- Length: 570 ft (173.7 m)
- Beam: 54 ft 6 in (16.6 m)
- Draught: 16 ft 6 in (5.0 m)
- Installed power: 8 × water-tube boilers; 80,000 shp (60,000 kW)
- Propulsion: 4 × shafts; 4 × geared steam turbines
- Speed: 33 knots (61 km/h; 38 mph)
- Range: 8,000 nmi (15,000 km; 9,200 mi) at 15 knots (28 km/h; 17 mph)
- Complement: 572 officers and ratings
- Armament: 7 × BL 6-inch Mk XII guns; 3 × QF 4-inch AA guns; 16 × 21-inch torpedo tubes (4×4)
- Armour: Belt: 3 in (76 mm) (amidships); 1.5–2.5 in (38–64 mm) (bow); 2 in (51 mm) (stern); Deck: 1 in (25 mm) (upper, amidships); 1 in (25 mm) (over rudder)
- Aircraft carried: 1 × Seafox
- Aviation facilities: 1 × catapult (later removed)

HMS Enterprise was one of two Emerald-class light cruisers built for the Royal Navy. She was built by John Brown & Company, with the keel being laid down on 28 June 1918. She was launched on 23 December 1919, and commissioned on 7 April 1926. She was the 14th ship to serve with the Royal Navy to carry the name Enterprise, a name which is still used in the Royal Navy.

Enterprise was completed with a prototype twin 6" turret in place of the original design two forward single mounts; and with the trials proving successful it was retained for the rest of her service career. This turret was later worked into the design of the Leander, Amphion and Arethusa classes. The turret installation occupied less space than the superimposed 'A' and 'B' guns of Emerald, therefore the bridge was placed further forward. The bridge was of a new design, being a single block topped by a director tower, rather than the traditional platforms built around the foremast and wheelhouse topped with a spotting top. This design of bridge would appear in the County-class cruisers.

== Service history ==
=== Pre-war ===
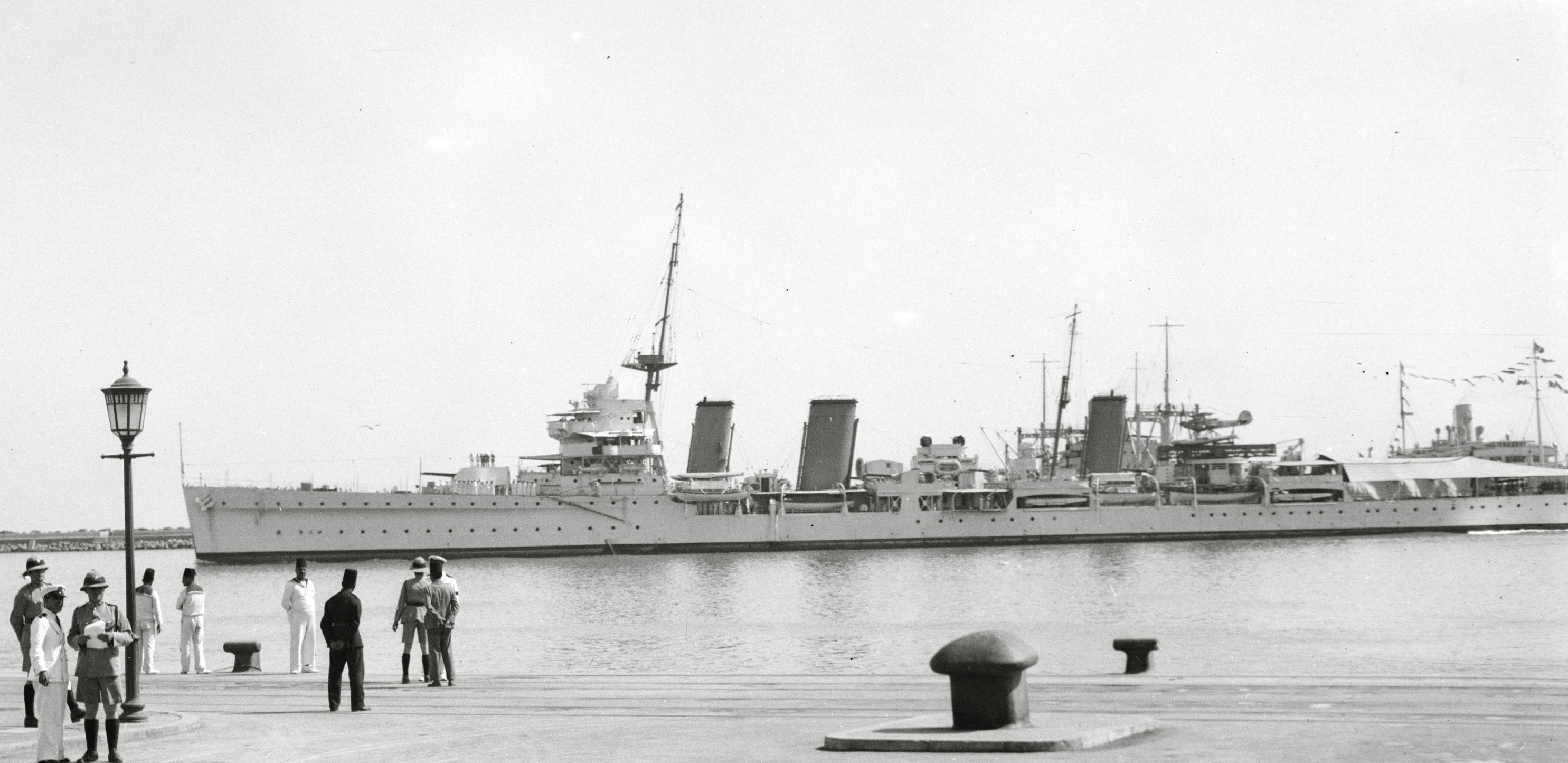
Enterprise at Haifa on 6 May 1936

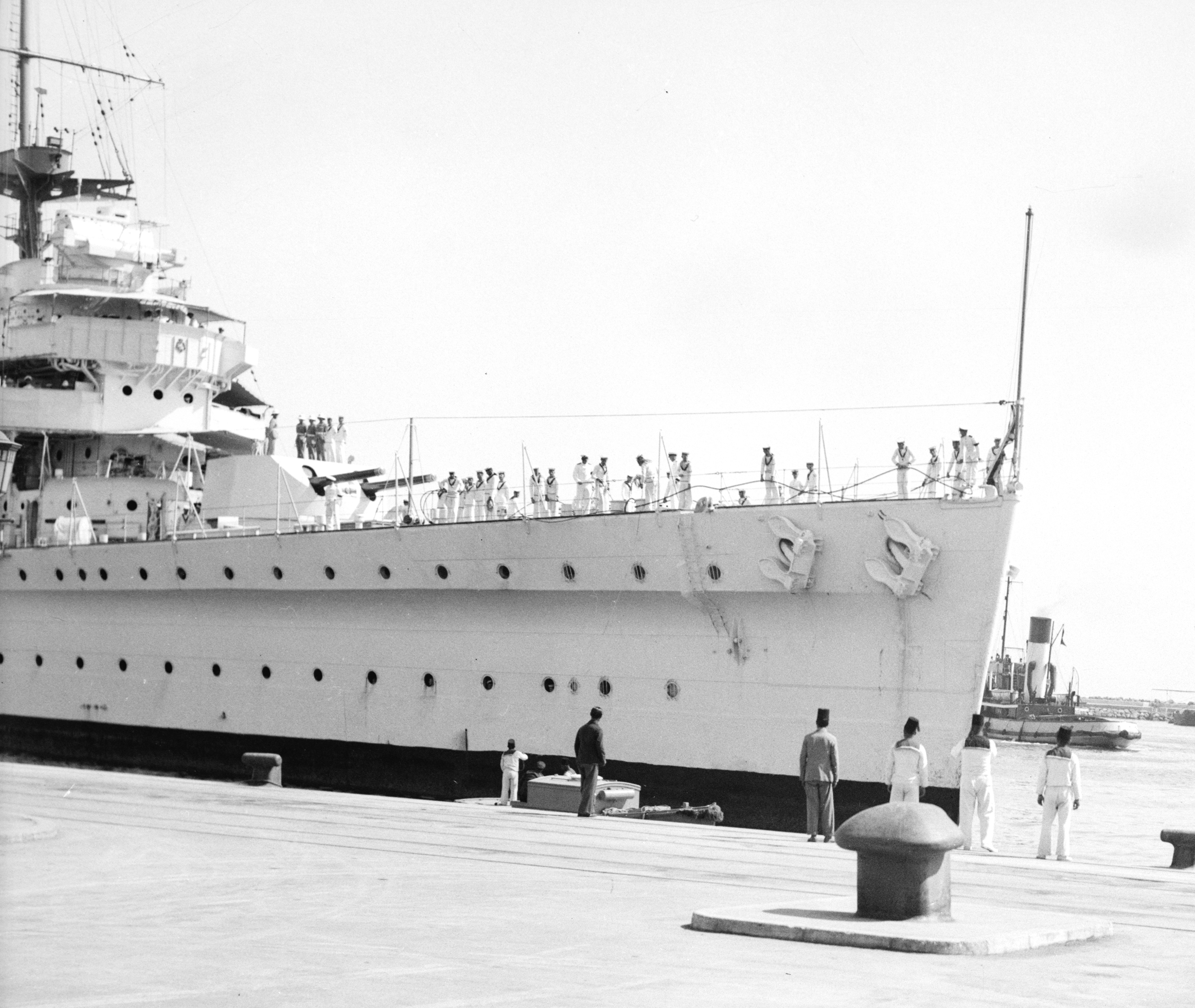
1936 photo showing the experimental twin turret

After several months in home waters, Enterprise served with the 4th Cruiser Squadron in the East Indies her first commission ending in December 1928. Her first commission was remarkable mostly for its culmination and the events that took place between 19 September and 10 December 1928 which are outlined under the history of the Enterprise Cup, a rugby union trophy that is still contested to this day in Kenya. Enterprise undertook several subsequent commissions on the East Indies Station, until she returned home and was reduced to care and maintenance on 4 July 1934, followed by a major refit. She returned to the East Indies in January 1936.

On the afternoon of 4 May 1936, Enterprise departed Djibouti in French Somaliland carrying the Emperor of Ethiopia, Haile Selassie – who had fled there as Italy completed its conquest of Ethiopia in the Second Italo-Ethiopian War – and transported him to Haifa in the British Mandate of Palestine, beginning his five-year period in exile in England at Fairfield House, Bath before he returned to Ethiopia in 1941.

The cruiser Manchester relieved Enterprise on the East Indies Station at the end of 1937, and Enterprise came home. In February 1938, she was tasked with transporting Princess Alice, Countess of Athlone and her husband The Earl of Athlone to Saudi Arabia - the first visit by a member of the British Royal Family. Later that year, she was employed to take crews to the China Station, returning home to pay off on 30 September 1938, when she was reduced to the Reserve Fleet.

=== Second World War ===
==== Initial stages ====
At the start of the Second World War in September 1939, Enterprise was recommissioned and joined Atlantic patrols with the 4th Cruiser Squadron. She later joined the North America and West Indies Squadron. Enterprise was employed on Atlantic escort duties with the Halifax Escort Force in 1939–1940. In October 1939, she oversaw the transfer of £10 million (£565 million in today's currency) in gold bullion to Canada during Operation Fish.

In April 1940, she was transferred to the Home Fleet for the Norwegian campaign. In April–May, she supported the British Army ashore by bombardments in and around Narvik, Norway, and on 19 April was attacked unsuccessfully by the German submarine U-65. On 25 May, she left Harstad with a third of the Norwegian National Treasury bound for Britain. She sailed first to Scapa Flow, surviving two German air attacks on the way, then proceeded to Greenock, where the gold was taken ashore.

After some repairs, Enterprise joined the newly formed Force H in June 1940 and set sail for the Mediterranean Sea where, in July, she participated in negotiations with the French Navy regarding the future of the French fleet in the war. Following the unsatisfactory outcome of the negotiations, she participated in Operation Catapult at Mers-El-Kébir. She also participated in the delivery of aircraft to Malta in late July.

==== Outside home waters ====
Force H was then re-organised and Enterprise was sent to Cape Town after which she became the flagship for operations in South America, primarily involved in trade defence and interception duties. In December 1940, she was deployed with the cruisers Cumberland and Newcastle in an unsuccessful search for the German auxiliary cruiser Thor which had attacked and damaged the armed merchant cruiser Carnarvon Castle.

In early 1941, she was redeployed to the Indian Ocean where, accompanied by a sizeable fleet of Royal Navy and Royal Australian Navy ships led by the aircraft carrier Hermes, she participated in a search for the German cruiser Admiral Scheer. After the search was abandoned, Enterprise took up convoy escort duty before being sent to Basra after a pro-German revolt by Rashid Ali al-Gaylani started the Anglo-Iraqi War. The war was won by the end of May, after which Enterprise was released back into convoy escort duty in the Indian Ocean.

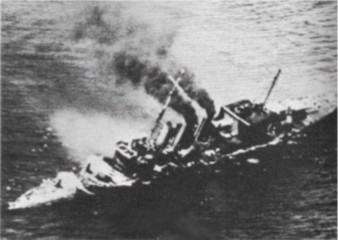
Cornwall sinking after a Japanese attack, Enterprise rescued some of her crew.

In November, she was under refit and repair in Colombo, which was finished just in time for the start of the War with Japan in December 1941. She escorted troop ships to Singapore and Rangoon, Burma, and then joined the Eastern Fleet under Admiral Sir James Somerville, taking part in protection of trade for the next year. On 6 April 1942, together with the destroyers Paladin and Panther, she picked up some of the 1,120 survivors of the cruisers Cornwall and Dorsetshire, which had been sunk by the Japanese in their Easter Sunday Raid. The Easter Sunday Raid was part of the larger Japanese Indian Ocean raid, which threatened British Ceylon. Enterprise participated in yet another fruitless search for enemy ships during this period, when it was believed the Japanese were preparing to strike and possibly invade the Indian Ocean island.

==== Home waters ====
On 25 December 1942, she returned to Clyde for extensive refit and modernisation works, which were completed only in October 1943. Trials and tests continued throughout November.

In late December 1943, she was deployed with the cruisers Gambia and Glasgow for Operation Stonewall.

On 28 December, she engaged a force of 11 German destroyers and torpedo boats, the tardy escort for their blockade runner Alsterufer (which had been sunk the previous day by air attack). Enterprise sank the torpedo boat T26 with a torpedo, while T25 and Z27 were also sunk. Four other German ships were damaged in the engagement.

From 3–29 February 1944, Enterprise was docked at Devonport for refit, and from 27–31 March she was fitted for missile jamming gear at Devonport.

==== The invasion of Normandy ====
In May, Enterprise was then assigned to Bombardment Force "A" with British ships Hawkins, Black Prince, Erebus, Netherlands ship Soemba, and US ships Nevada, Tuscaloosa, and Quincy. She was in sub-group Assault Force "U" (for Utah Beach), of which she was the lead ship.

When the Normandy Landings started on 6 June 1944, Bombardment Force "A" bombarded St. Martin de Varreville. Enterprise engaged the coastal defences of Cherbourg; in the ensuing action, her Captain and her Commander were both wounded, and the ship was brought back to Portland by the First Lieutenant, Lieutenant Commander Brown. Twenty days later, she was also involved in the bombardment of Querqueville, silencing the German guns there. German shore batteries opened fire, but caused no significant damage to Enterprise. During the D-day operations, Enterprise fired about 9,000 6-inch shells and required two overnight gun changes at Portsmouth.

In July, she was deployed off the French coast in support of British operations, and on 17 July, she provided naval gunfire for two days in support for British attacks near Caen with the cruiser Mauritius and the monitor Roberts. In September, she was deployed in a similar capacity off the Dutch coast in support of the Second Army; however, she was not required to support the troops.

In October, after a contemplated transfer to the Royal Canadian Navy was not implemented, Enterprise was taken out of active service and placed in reserve at Rosyth.

=== Post-war ===
Starting in May 1945, Enterprise helped return British troops from Asia and Africa. On 13 January 1946, she returned to the United Kingdom for the final time. She was handed over to BISCO for scrapping on 11 April, arriving at J Cashmore in Newport, Wales, on 21 April for breaking-up.

== Armament refits ==
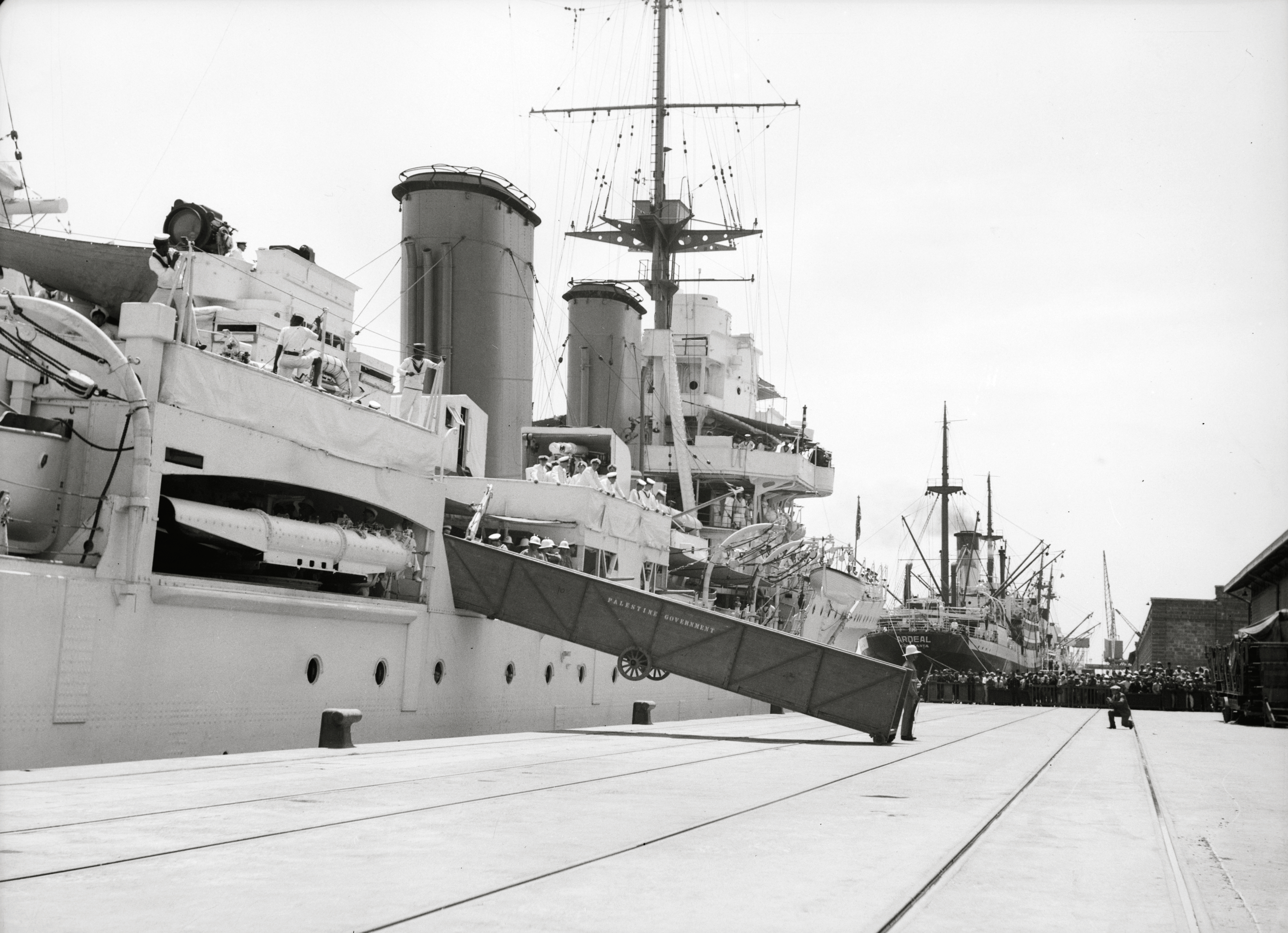
Enterprise - May 1936

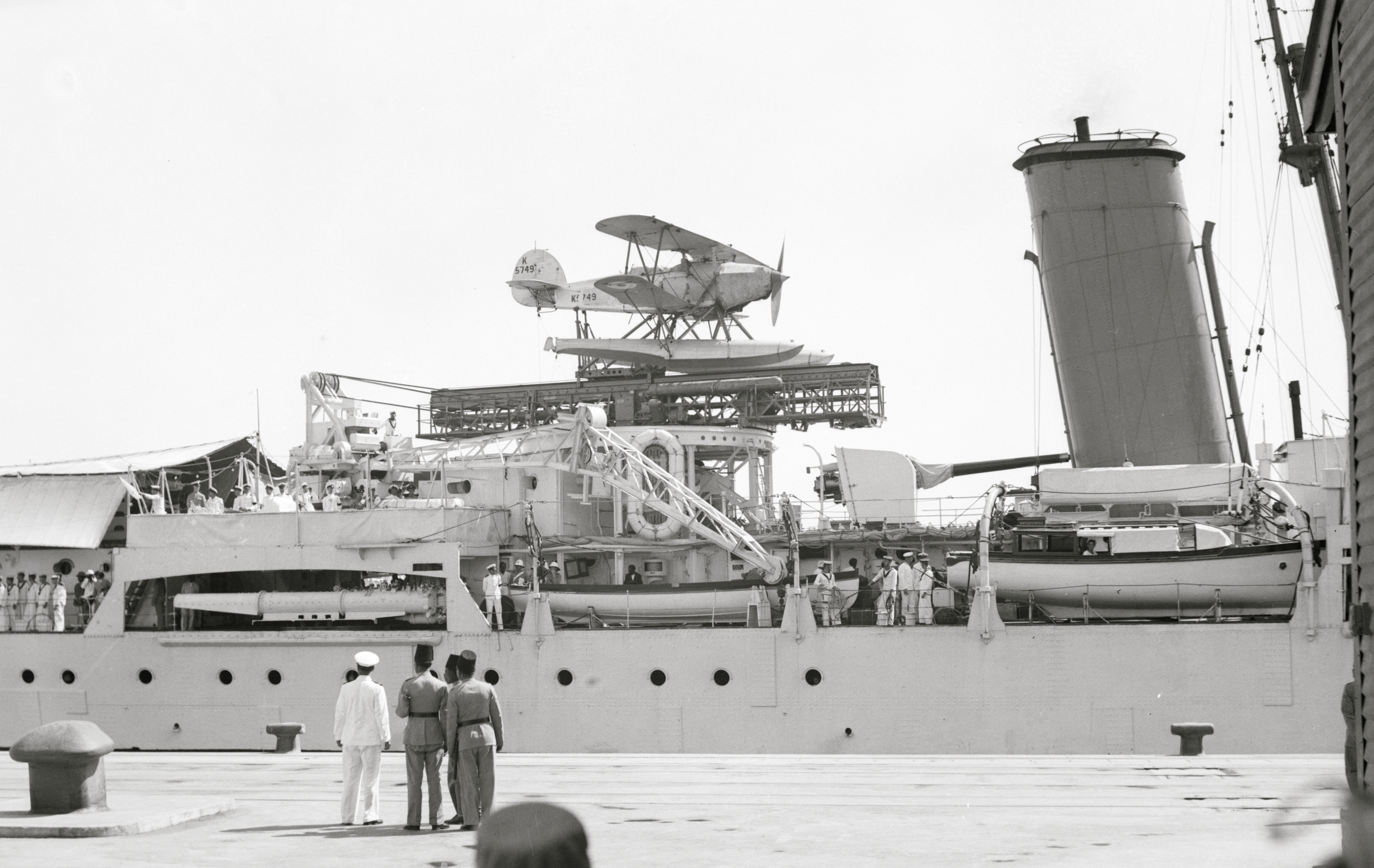
Enterprise - May 1936

Throughout her service, Enterprise was refitted with a slightly differing array of weaponry. Below is a table of the new armament after her first refit:

Dates	Armament
Aug 1939 - Aug 1942	1 × 2 6-inch turret 5 × 6-inch single guns 2 × 0.5-inch MG quadruple guns 4 × 2 pdr pom-pom single guns 4 × 21-inch quadruple torpedo tubes
Apr 1943 - Apr 1944	1 × 2 6-inch turret 5 × 6-inch single guns 2 × 2 pdr pom-poms quad guns 4 × 2 pdr pom-pom single guns 6 × 20 mm dual power-operated guns 4 × 21-inch quadruple torpedo tubes
Apr 1944 - 1945	1 × 2 6-inch turret 5 × 6-inch single guns 2 × 2 pdr pom-poms quad guns 4 × 2 pdr pom-pom single guns 6 × 20 mm dual power-operated guns 6 × 20 mm single guns 4 × 21-inch quadruple torpedo tubes

== Battle honours ==
For her service in the Second World War, Enterprise was awarded four battle honours:

- Atlantic (1939–40)
- Norway (1940)
- Biscay (1943)
- Normandy (1944)

In addition, the ship inherited a battle honour from the fourth-rate ship of the line Enterprize, which fought against Bourbon Spain in the Seven Years' War:

- Havana (1762)
