= German submarine U-107 =

U-107 may refer to one of the following German submarines:

- SM U-107, a Type U 93 submarine launched in 1917 and that served in World War I until surrendered on 20 November 1918; broken up at Swansea in 1922
  - During the First World War, Germany also had this submarine with a similar name:
    - SM UB-107, a Type UB III submarine launched in 1917 and sunk between 28 July – 4 August 1918
- German submarine U-107 (1940), a Type IXB submarine that served in World War II until sunk on 18 August 1944
