= Italian cruiser Luigi di Savoia Duca degli Abruzzi =

Light cruiser (1937–1961)

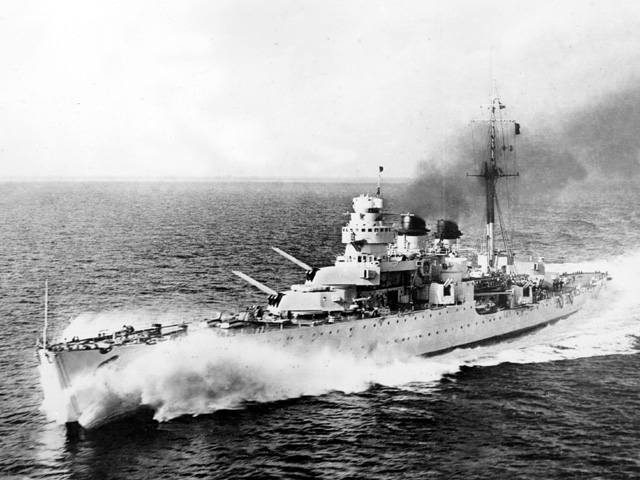
- Luigi di Savoia Duca Degli Abruzzi during sea trials (1938)

History

Italy
- Name: Luigi di Savoia Duca Degli Abruzzi
- Namesake: Prince Luigi Amedeo, Duke of the Abruzzi
- Builder: O.T.O., La Spezia
- Laid down: 28 December 1933
- Launched: 21 April 1936
- Commissioned: 1 December 1937
- Decommissioned: January 1961
- Refit: 1953
- Fate: Scrapped 1972

General characteristics
- Class & type: Duca degli Abruzzi-class cruiser
- Displacement: 11,350 tons standard; 11,735 tons full load
- Length: 171.1–187 m (561–614 ft)
- Beam: 18.9 m (62 ft)
- Draught: 6.9 m (23 ft)
- Propulsion: 6 boilers; 2 shafts; 100,000 hp (75,000 kW)
- Speed: 34 knots (63 km/h; 39 mph) (62 km/h)
- Range: 4,125 nmi (7,640 km; 4,747 mi) at 13 kn (24 km/h; 15 mph)
- Complement: 640
- Armament: 10 × 152 mm / 55 caliber (6 in); 8 × 100 mm (4 in) / 47 caliber guns; 8 × 37 mm (1.5 in) 54-cal. guns; 12 × 20 mm (1 in)/65 caliber; 6 × 533 mm torpedo tubes; 2 × anti-submarines mortars
- Armour: Outer Belt: 30 mm (1.2 in); Inner Belt: 100 mm (3.9 in); Main Deck: 40 mm (1.6 in); Upper Deck: 10–15 mm (0.39–0.59 in); Turrets: 135 mm (5.3 in); Barbettes: 30–100 mm (1.2–3.9 in); Outer Bulkheads: 30 mm (1.2 in); Inner Bulkheads: 100 mm (3.9 in); Conning Tower: 30–140 mm (1.2–5.5 in)
- Aircraft carried: 4 × Ro.43

Luigi di Savoia Duca degli Abruzzi was an Italian Duca degli Abruzzi-class light cruiser, which served in the Regia Marina during World War II. After the war, she was retained by the Marina Militare and decommissioned in 1961. She was built by OTO at La Spezia and named after Prince Luigi Amedeo, Duke of the Abruzzi, an Italian explorer and Admiral of World War I.

== Design ==
The Duca degli Abruzzi-class cruisers were the final version of the Condottieri class and were larger and better protected than their predecessors. The armament was also increased by two extra 152 mm guns, triple turrets replaced twins in the "A" and "Y" positions thus making them the most heavily armed light cruisers of Italy during World War II. The machinery was also revised which led to these ships having a slightly slower maximum speed than their predecessors.

== Career ==
=== World War II ===
The ship was completed in 1937 and formed the 8th Cruiser division with her sister ship Giuseppe Garibaldi. She fought in the following actions:

- Battle of Calabria, where she led a squadron of light cruisers which fired the first salvoes of the battle
- 1 September 1940: Part of the fleet that attempted to intercept the convoy Hats
- Battle of Cape Matapan
- 24 September 1941: Part of the fleet that attempted to intercept the convoy Halberd headed for Malta.

On 22 November 1942, the light cruiser was badly damaged during an air attack by a British Fairey Albacore torpedo bomber piloted by Lt Ian Fraser, and had to undergo repairs. She was interned by the Allies after the Italian Armistice and later served with the Italian Co-Belligerent Navy in the South Atlantic on operations against potential German raiders.

=== Post war ===
After 1945, her torpedo launchers were removed and replaced by two 4 inch anti-aircraft guns. Since 1953 she was equipped with an AN/SPS-6 2D air search radar.

In late 1953, during the negotiations which ended in the handover of Trieste to Italy, the cruiser was transferred from Taranto to Venezia, in order to strengthen the Italian position at the bargaining table. Eventually, on 26 October 1954, Duca degli Abruzzi was the flagship of the Italian naval force which took possession of Trieste's port facilities. She served in the post war Marina Militare until 1961.
