= HMS Glasgow (C21) =

Town-class cruiser

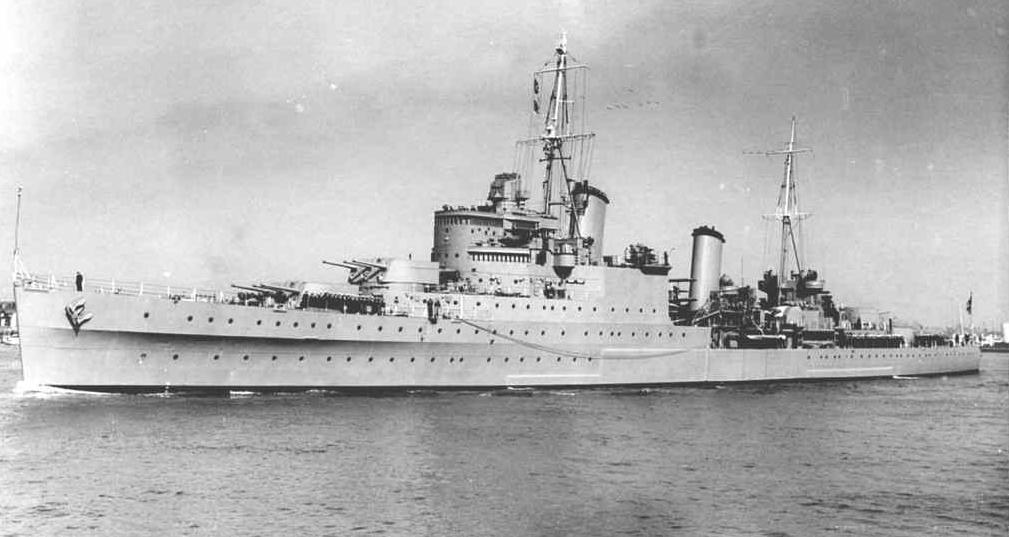
- Glasgow

History

United Kingdom
- Name: Glasgow
- Namesake: Glasgow
- Builder: Scotts Shipbuilding and Engineering Company, Greenock
- Laid down: 16 April 1935
- Launched: 20 June 1936
- Commissioned: 9 September 1937
- Decommissioned: November 1956
- Identification: Pennant number: C21
- Fate: Sold for scrap, July 1958

General characteristics
- Class & type: Town-class light cruiser
- Displacement: 9,100 tons standard; 11,350 tons full load
- Length: 591 ft (180 m) overall
- Beam: 61 ft 8 in (18.80 m)
- Draught: 21 ft 6 in (6.55 m)
- Installed power: 4 × Admiralty 3-drum boilers; 75,000 shp
- Propulsion: Four-shaft geared turbines
- Speed: 32 knots (59 km/h; 37 mph)
- Complement: 748
- Armament: Original configuration: 12 × BL 6 in (152 mm) Mk XXIII guns in triple turrets (4×3) (one aft turret later replaced by 8 × Bofors 40 mm guns); 8 × QF 4 in (102 mm) Mk XVI guns (4×2); 8 × QF 2-pounder (40-mm) anti-aircraft guns (2×4); 8 × 0.5 in (12.7 mm) anti-aircraft machine-guns (2×4); 6 × 21 in (533 mm) torpedo tubes (2×3) (deck mounted, later removed)
- Aircraft carried: Two Supermarine Walrus aircraft (Removed in the latter part of WWII)

HMS Glasgow was a Town-class cruiser commissioned in September 1937. She took part in the Fleet Air Arm raid that crippled the Italian Fleet at Taranto in 1940. She had the unfortunate experience of sinking two Allied ships during her wartime service, once through accidental collision and the other by gunfire after a case of mistaken identity.

== Construction ==
Laid down on 16 April 1935, Glasgow was launched on 20 June 1936 by Lucy Baldwin, the wife of the prime minister Stanley Baldwin. She entered service without some components of her main armament's fire control system, which were subsequently fitted at the end of that year. She commenced sea trials in the spring of 1937. Designed with a maximum speed of 32 knots (59 km/h; 37 mph) she achieved 33 knots (61 km/h; 38 mph) at standard displacement during her trials. She was subsequently commissioned on 9 September 1937.

== Service history ==
=== Pre-war service ===
Upon entering service Glasgow was allocated to the 2nd Cruiser Squadron of the Home Fleet. Her service was mostly uneventful, consisting of fleet exercises and 'flag showing'. Her most glamorous operation was when together with her sister HMS Southampton she escorted the liner Empress of Australia on the outward and the liner Empress of Britain on the return voyage carrying King George VI and Queen Elizabeth to Canada on their royal visit to the United States and Canada in May and June 1939.

=== Norwegian Campaign ===
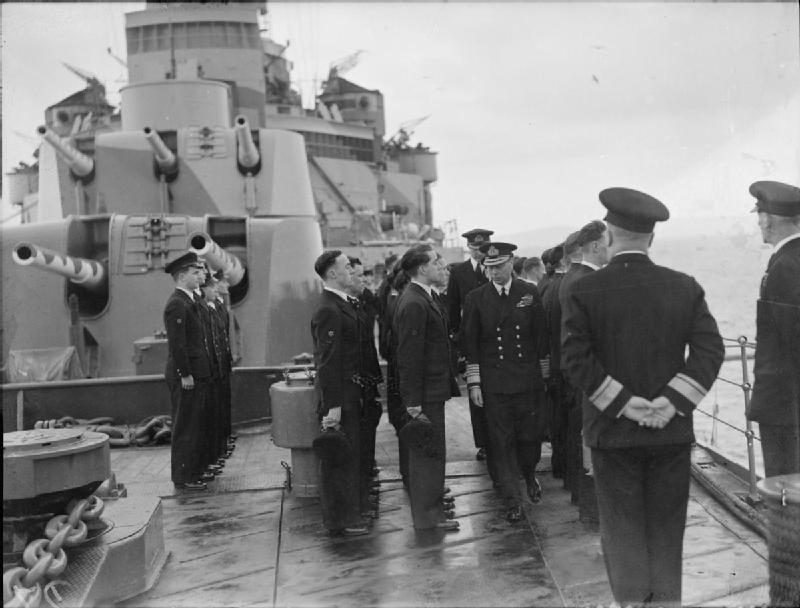
King George VI, wearing the uniform of an Admiral of the Fleet, inspecting personnel from Glasgow's crew at Scapa Flow as part of a four-day visit to the Home Fleet. Her two forward 6-inch gun turrets can be seen in the background

Glasgow remained allocated to the Home Fleet during the first year of the Second World War, under the command of Captain Frank Pegram from July 1939 to April 1940.

With war approaching, Glasgow sailed on 2 September 1939 from Grimsby to patrol off the Norwegian coast with Humber Force to intercept any German commerce raider attempting to reach the Atlantic or any blockade runner returning to Germany. While operating with the Humber Force, she, in company with the cruisers Southampton and Edinburgh, was subjected to a heavy air attack by the Luftwaffe on 9 October 1939, but suffered no damage despite 120 bombs being dropped on the ships.

On the outbreak of war, she operated off the Scandinavian coast, and in November was off the coast of Norway with two destroyers in the hope of intercepting the German passenger ship SS Bremen which had sailed from Murmansk. This was unsuccessful, but on 12 February 1940, she captured the German trawler Herrlichkeit off Tromsø.

On 9 April 1940, she was attacked off Bergen by Junkers Ju 88 and Heinkel He 111 aircraft and damaged by two near misses. Both bombs fell about 15 feet (4.6 m) from the ship's side, one bursting on impact abreast station 70 and the other under water further forward. A large proportion of the bomb, which burst on impact entered the ship three feet (0.91 m) above the lower deck level, holing an area of approximately six by three feet (1.83 by 0.91 m) with about 60 scattered splinters entering the ship's side in all. The ship's movement allowed a considerable quantity of water to enter the hull, causing the mess decks between stations 53 and 74 to be flooded by one foot (30 cm) of water. Some minor underwater damage and a small amount of flooding occurred further forward, probably as a result of the other bomb. In addition, the forward 'A' turret was temporarily out of action. Two crew members were killed and five were wounded. After returning to Scapa Flow on 10 April for temporary repairs and transfer of the dead and wounded, the ship returned to sea 22 hours later.

On 11 April 1940, during the Allied campaign in Norway in World War II, Glasgow, along with HMS Sheffield and six Tribal-class destroyers landed troops near Harstad and three days later on 14 April, again in company with Sheffield and ten destroyers, landed an advance force of Royal Marines at Namsos to seize and secure the wharves and approaches to the town, preparatory to the landing of a larger Allied force. On 23 April Glasgow, Sheffield, HMS Galatea and six destroyers landed the first part of the 15th Infantry Brigade in Åndalsnes. On 29 April, she evacuated King Haakon and Crown Prince Olav of Norway, Nygaardsvold's Cabinet and part of the Norwegian gold reserves when they fled from Molde to Tromsø, escaping the advancing German forces. She then departed to the United Kingdom on 1 May, carrying among others the Minister of Foreign Affairs Halvdan Koht and the Minister of Defence Birger Ljungberg.

=== Mediterranean service ===
Whilst operating in home waters after the withdrawal from Norway, Glasgow accidentally rammed and sank the destroyer HMS Imogen in thick fog off Duncansby Head on 16 July 1940. Glasgow was able to rescue the majority of the destroyer's crew but 19 lost their lives as well as two crew members of Glasgow.

Following repairs Glasgow was transferred to the Mediterranean where she was employed as a convoy escort and as a reinforcement of the 3rd Cruiser Squadron based at Alexandria. She took part in the Fleet Air Arm raid that crippled the Italian Fleet at Taranto; on 14 November, Glasgow, along with Berwick, HMAS Sydney and HMS York, landed 3,400 troops from Alexandria in Piraeus. On 26 November, Glasgow, HMS Gloucester and York escorted a supply convoy from Alexandria to Malta.

On 3 December Glasgow was attacked by Italian aircraft while anchored in Suda Bay, Crete. She was hit by two torpedoes fired by a Savoia-Marchetti SM.79 flown by Carlo Emanuele Buscaglia. The torpedoes struck far forward and aft, the latter putting two of her propeller shafts out of service. Other than that she received only moderate damage. She was able to return to Alexandria, where as the shipyard did not have the resources and capability to make a full repair, she was repaired to a level that allowed her to return to secondary duties. During this period she was temporarily replaced by HMS Southampton.

=== Far East service ===
As a result of her diminished capability Glasgow was allocated to the Indian Ocean, leaving Alexandria on 12 February 1941 and passing through the Suez Canal. On 18 February she joined East Indies Fleet at Aden. In February the German cruiser Admiral Scheer sank the freighters Canadian Cruiser and Rantaupandjang in the Indian Ocean. Both managed to transmit distress signals, that were picked up by Glasgow, which deployed in search of the German ship. On 22 January, Admiral Scheer was sighted by the spotter aircraft from Glasgow, the East Indies Task Force was deployed to the reported area. However, Admiral Scheer had escaped by turning away to the southeast and further searches were in vain. In March Glasgow, in company with HMS Caledon, two auxiliary cruisers, two destroyers and two anti-submarine trawlers of the Indian Navy, escorted two troop transport vessels containing two Indian battalions and one Somali commando detachment, who were landed on either side of Berbera, in Somaliland, which had previously been occupied by the Italians. The town was taken after only slight Italian resistance, which was soon broken by naval gunfire from Glasgow and the other escorts.

At midnight on 9 December 1941, Glasgow sank the RIN patrol vessel HMIS Prabhavati with two lighters in tow en route to Karachi, with 6-inch shells at 6,000 yards (5,500 m). Prabhavati was alongside the lighters and was mistaken for a surfaced Japanese submarine. Glasgow picked up the survivors and took them to Bombay, arriving there later that day.

On 19 March 1942, Glasgow escorted convoy WS-16 from the UK to South Africa. In April Glasgow again underwent temporary repairs, this time in Simonstown, South Africa. She subsequently sailed to the US for permanent repairs at the Brooklyn Navy Yard from 6 May onwards. As well as repairing the damage from her 1940 torpedo attack, additional 20 mm Oerlikon cannons were added to improve her close range anti-aircraft capability. It was also decided to improve her radar suite by replacing her existing Type 286M radar with the new Type 271, while a Type 284 fire-control radar to control her main armament, type 285 and 282 aircraft warning fire-control and Type 281 aircraft warning radars were installed.

Following the completion of her shipyard work, she returned to the UK in August to complete work on her radar installations at Portsmouth. On 3 September she joined the 10th Cruiser Squadron at Scapa Flow where she was assigned to covering forces for the Arctic convoys.

=== In the Arctic and home waters ===
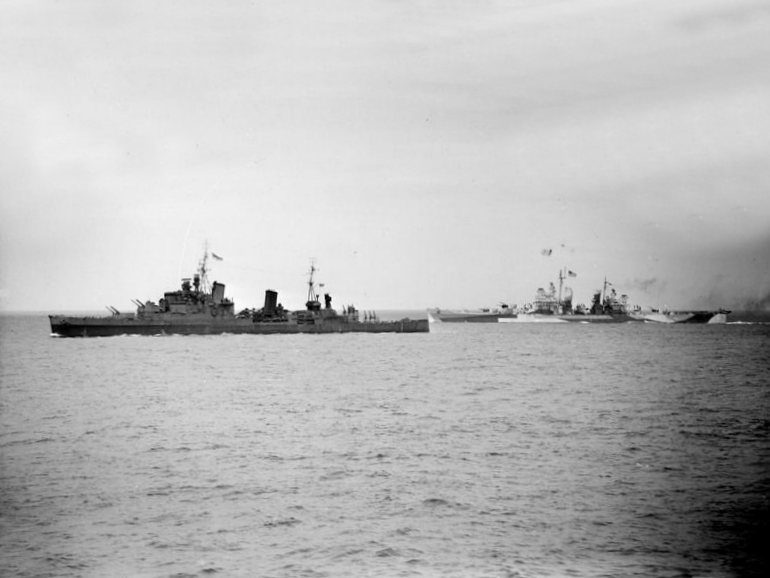
HMS Glasgow (left) and USS Quincy (right) during the bombardment of Cherbourg in support of the advancing Allied troops

Glasgow escorted Arctic convoys between January and February 1943. In March she intercepted the German blockade runner Regensburg in the Denmark Strait as it returned from the Far East with valuable rubber, tungsten and other commodities. Her crew managed to scuttle the ship, but most of the crew drowned in the heavy seas while abandoning her, with Glasgow being able to recover only six survivors. During June and July she supplied cover for escort groups in the Bay of Biscay.

Between August and September she entered the HM Dockyard at Devonport where her aircraft facilities were removed and more 20 mm weapons were installed to improve her air defences. She received a new Fire-Control Type 283. The opportunity was also taken to install IFF equipment and VHF radio-telephone outfits. Upon completion of her refit she was transferred to join the Commander-in-Chief, Plymouth. On 26 October she took to sea the First Sea Lord, Admiral Sir Andrew Cunningham to undertake the interment of the ashes of Admiral Sir Dudley Pound and his late wife in the Solent.

In December 1943 she formed part of Operation Stonewall, the interception of German blockade runners. In late December, Glasgow and the cruiser HMS Enterprise in the Battle of the Bay of Biscay fought a three-hour battle with eleven German destroyers and torpedo boats of which three were sunk and four damaged by gunfire. After this engagement Glasgow returned to Plymouth in spite of several air attacks where glider bombs were used.

On 6 June 1944 Glasgow was part of Operation Neptune, (the Normandy landings). Along with the battleships USS Texas and USS Arkansas, the French cruisers Montcalm and Georges Leygues, nine US destroyers and three Hunt-class destroyers, she made up the Gunfire Bombardment Support Force C for Omaha Beach. On 25–26 June, in support of the attack by the 7th US Corps on Cherbourg, she conducted the Bombardment of Cherbourg shelled German artillery batteries near Querqueville. During this exchange of fire Glasgow was hit and damaged. In August 1945 she set sail for the East Indies, where she was the flagship of the Commander-in-Chief.

=== Modernisation ===
With the demand for cruisers in the European theatre decreasing it was decided to withdraw Glasgow and modernise her in preparation for the ongoing war in the Pacific. Entering a shipyard on the River Tyne on 3 July 1944 her aft 6-inch turret ('X') was removed to compensate for the additional weight of adding the more powerful anti-aircraft armament needed to counter the threat of kamikaze attacks. The space freed by the removal of the aft turret was used to mount two quad 40 mm Bofors guns. New radar systems were fitted, including a single aerial air warning Type 281B (which replaced an earlier twin mast Type 281), a surface warning Type 293 (which replaced the existing Type 273), while the main armament's Type 284 gunnery radar was replaced by a Type 274. She was also fitted with a US made YE homing beacon to help her undertake the high risk role of a radar picket. The beacon issued coded directions to Allied aircraft returning from missions, which would allow Glasgow to be stationed on an outer screen around the main fleet to separate Allied aircraft from accompanying enemy aircraft and so destroy enemy aircraft before they reached the fleet. The modernisation was completed on 29 June 1945. She then spent July working up for operational war service.

=== Postwar ===
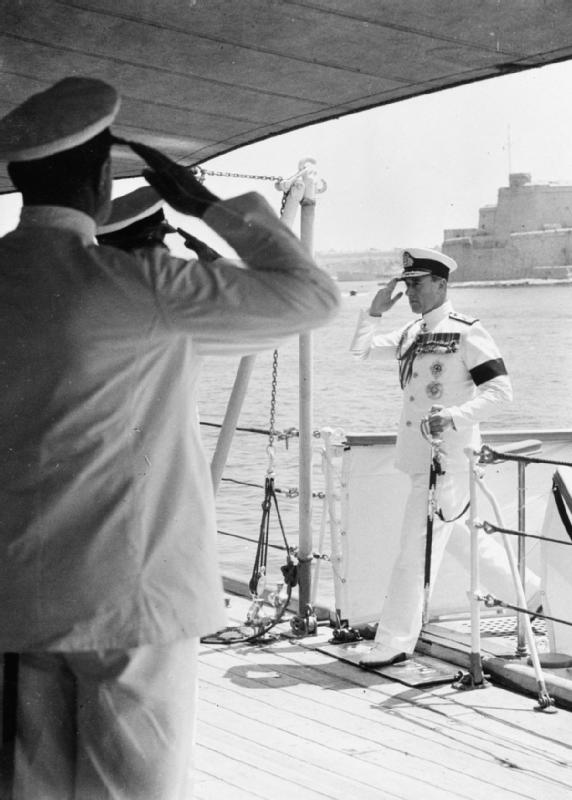
Mountbatten arrives on board HMS Glasgow at Malta to assume command of the Mediterranean Fleet, 16 May 1952

On 22 August 1945 Glasgow set out with HMS Jamaica for the East Indies as acting flagship. She transferred to the Indian Ocean arriving in Colombo on 5 October to relieve HMS Phoebe as the flagship of 5th Cruiser Squadron. After serving for two years in the Indian Ocean Glasgow returned to Portsmouth and was placed in the Reserve. Following a refit she was recommissioned in September 1948, and on 26 October, 1948, Glasgow replaced HMS Sheffield at her new base, the Royal Naval Dockyard in the Imperial fortress colony of Bermuda, as the flagship on the America and West Indies Station. She attended the Halifax bicentenary celebrations in Nova Scotia in 1949, returning to the UK in October 1950.

She was then refitted at Chatham in 1951 before becoming in 1952 the flagship of the Mediterranean Fleet based at Malta under Admiral the Earl Mountbatten of Burma. In 1953, she took part in the film Sailor of the King. In the same year, she took part in the Fleet Review to celebrate the Coronation of Queen Elizabeth II.

Together with HMS Gambia, HMS Bermuda, HMS Eagle, seven destroyers, and two frigates she escorted Queen Elizabeth II and Duke of Edinburgh on board the royal yacht Britannia at the end of their world tour to Malta where they arrived on 2 May 1954. She was still in the Mediterranean Fleet when together with HMS Gambia she participated in August 1954 in the withdrawal of 40 Commando Royal Marines from Port Said.

In 1955 Glasgow returned to the UK and, from May 1955 onwards, rejoined the Home Fleet as flagship of the Flag Officer D (Flotillas) before being paid off at Portsmouth in November 1956. The Suez crisis in 1956 caused Glasgow to be temporarily recommissioned.

=== Decommissioning and disposal ===
After the Suez Crisis it was decided that Glasgow was surplus to requirements and was paid off in November 1956. The warship was placed on the disposal list in March 1958 and was sold to BISCO for demolition. Departing Portsmouth on 4 July Glasgow arrived under tow on 8 July at Hughes Bolckow's yard in Blyth for breaking up.
