= Antonino Toscano =

Italian admiral

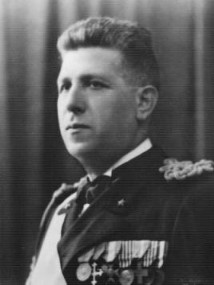
- Born: 19 July 1887; Agrigento, Sicily, Italy
- Died: 13 December 1941 (aged 54); Mediterranean Sea
- Military career
- Allegiance: Kingdom of Italy
- Branch: Regia Marina
- Service years: 1905–1941
- Rank: Ammiraglio di Divisione (Vice Admiral)
- Commands: 69 PN (torpedo boat); 4th Naval Division
- Conflicts: Italo-Turkish War; World War I; Adriatic Campaign; World War II; Battle of the Mediterranean; Battle of Cape Bon
- Awards: Silver Medal of Military Valor; Gold Medal of Military Valor (posthumous)

Antonino Toscano (19 July 1883 – 13 December 1941) was an Italian admiral during World War II. He was killed in the Battle of Cape Bon.

== Early life and career ==
Born in Agrigento in 1887, Toscano entered the Italian Naval Academy at Livorno in 1905; he was commissioned as an ensign in February 1909. In 1911, after being promoted to sub-lieutenant, he joined the crew of the torpedo boat Astore, taking part in the Italo-Turkish War. On the night between 18 and 19 July 1912 Toscano, on board Astore, took part in the attempted forcing of the Dardanelles by five Italian torpedo boats (Astore, Spica, Centauro, Climene and Perseo), aiming to attack the Turkish fleet in the Black Sea. The torpedo boats, under the command of Captain Enrico Millo, ventured for about 15 miles inside the straits, before being forced to retreat under heavy artillery and machine gun fire. Toscano was awarded a Silver Medal of Military Valor for his part in this raid. Later promoted to lieutenant, Toscano commanded the torpedo boat 69 PN during World War I, carrying out several missions. In 1919, Toscano participated in the Italian occupation of Albania. Promoted to lieutenant commander in 1922, four years later Toscano was appointed teacher of Naval Art and History at the Accademia Aeronautica in Caserta. In November 1926 he was promoted to commander. Later assigned to the Naval Warfare Institute in Livorno, between 1937 and 1939 he became its course director, first as a captain and later as a rear admiral. In July 1939, Toscano became General Personnel Manager.

== World War II ==
At the beginning of World War II, Toscano was a member of the High Council of the Navy. For the first sixteen months of war, he did not participate in any naval engagement. On 15 October 1941, after promotion to vice admiral (Ammiraglio di Divisione), he was appointed commander of the 4th Naval Division, initially with the light cruiser Alberto di Giussano as his flagship; soon, however, this role was moved to her sistership Alberico Da Barbiano.

At the beginning of December 1941, the supply lines between Italy and Libya were in a dire situation: during the previous month, attacks by the Force K had led to the destruction of several Italian convoys (most notably the Duisburg convoy) and the loss of nearly 70% of the supplies sent to Libya, including 92% of the fuel. The Italo-German forces in North Africa, facing a new Allied offensive, were in urgent need of fuel and ammunitions. Supermarina (the general staff of the Royal Italian Navy), at the request of Comando Supremo (the supreme command of the Italian armed forces), developed an emergency plan of transport of badly needed supplies using warships. The cruisers of the 4th Division, since they were fast and too lightly armored for employment with the battle fleet, were selected for this role. Da Barbiano, with Toscano on board, and Di Giussano left Taranto at 8:15 on 5 December 1941, reached Brindisi at 17:50 and there loaded about 50 tons of supplies, then proceeded to Palermo on 8 December, where they loaded an additional 22 tons of aviation fuel, which was especially needed in Libya (otherwise, aircraft based there would soon become unable to escort incoming convoys with vital supplies). The fuel, contained in unsealed barrels, was placed on the stern deck, thus posing great danger in case of enemy attacks (not only it would be set afire by mere strafing, but even by the flames of the ships’ own guns, thus preventing the use of the stern turrets). The two cruisers sailed unescorted from Palermo at 17:20 on 9 December, heading for Tripoli, but at 22:56 they were spotted by a British reconnaissance plane north of Pantelleria. The plane, which had located Toscano's ships thanks to Ultra intercepts, started to shadow them. At 23:55 Toscano (who was at that time in the middle of the Sicilian Channel), since the surprise (required for the success of the mission) had vanished, heavy enemy radio traffic foreshadowed upcoming air strikes, and worsening sea conditions would delay his ships, further exposing them to British attacks, decided to turn back to base. Da Barbiano and Di Giussano reached Palermo at 8:20 on 10 December, after overcoming a British air attack off Marettimo. Toscano was heavily criticized by Supermarina for his decision to abort the mission.

Since for 13 December a new convoy operation, called M. 41, was planned, and the air cover by aircraft based in Libya would only be possible if they received new fuel, on 12 December it was decided that the 4th Division would attempt again the trip to Tripoli. The cruiser Bande Nere was to join Da Barbiano and Di Giussano to carry more supplies, but she was prevented from sailing by a breakdown, thus her cargo had to be transferred to the other two cruisers. Da Barbiano and Di Giussano were overall loaded with 100 tons of aviation fuel, 250 tons of gasoline, 600 tons of naphtha and 900 tons of food stores, as well as 135 ratings on passage to Tripoli. As the stern of Da Barbiano (and, to a lesser extent, Di Giussano) was packed with fuel barrels, so thickly that it was not possible anymore to bring the guns to bear, Toscano held a last assembly with his staff and officers from both ships, where it was decided that, in case of encounter with enemy ships, the barrels would be discarded overboard, and then the cruisers would open fire (otherwise, the fuel would have been set afire by the firing of the cruisers' own guns). Da Barbiano, Di Giussano and their only escort, the torpedo boat Cigno (a secondo torpedo boat, Climene , was left in the port due to a breakdown), sailed from Palermo at 18:10 on 12 December. The 4th Division was ordered to pass northwest of the Aegadian Islands and then head for Cape Bon and follow the Tunisian coast; the ships would keep a speed of 22-23 knots (not more, because they were to spare part of their own fuel and deliver it at Tripoli). Air cover, air reconnaissance and defensive MAS ambushes were planned to safeguard the mission. In the afternoon of 12 December, a CANT Z. 1007 bis of Regia Aeronautica spotted four destroyers heading east at an estimated speed of 20 knots, 60 miles off Algiers; Supermarina was immediately informed. The ships were the destroyers HMS Sikh, Legion, Maori and Isaac Sweers of the 4th Destroyer Flotilla (Captain Graham Henry Stokes), on passage from Gibraltar to Malta and Alexandria. Supemarina calculated that, even in the case the destroyers would increase their speed to 28 knots, they would have reached Cape Bon around 3:00 AM on 13 December, about one hour after the 4th Division, so Toscano (who learned of the sighting while he was still in harbour) was not ordered to increase speed or alter course to avoid them. Following new Ultra decodes, a new reconnaissance plane was sent and spotted Toscano's ships at sunset on 12 December, after which the 4th Destroyer Flotilla was directed to intercept the two cruisers, increasing speed to 30 knots. This speed, along with a one-hour delay that the 4th Division had accrued (and that Toscano omitted to report to Supermarina), frustrated all previous Supermarina calculations about the advantage that the 4th Division would have. At 22:23 Toscano was informed that he would possibly meet "enemy steamers coming from Malta", and at 23:15 he ordered action stations. At 2:45 on 13 December, seven miles off Cape Bon, the ships heard the noise of a British plane (a radar-equipped Vickers Wellington, which located the ships and informed Stokes about their position), and at 3:15 they altered course to 157° to pass about one mile off Cape Bon. Five minutes later, Toscano suddenly ordered full speed ahead and to alter course to 337°, effectively reversing course; this sudden change disrupted the Italian formation, as neither Cigno (which was about two miles ahead of the cruisers) neither Di Giussano (which was following Da Barbiano in line) received the order, and while Di Giussano saw the flagship reverse course and imitated her (but remained misaligned), Cigno did not noticed the change till 3:25, when she also reversed course, but remained much behind the two cruisers.

The reasons for Toscano's decision of reverse course have never been fully explained: it has been suggested that, upon realizing that he had been spotted by aircraft, he decided to turn back like on 9 December (but in this case, a course towards the Aegadian islands would have made more sense, instead that the northwesterly course ordered by Toscano; and the change was suddenly ordered more than 30 minutes after the cruisers had been spotted); that he wanted to mislead the reconnaissance plane about his real course, wait for it to go away, and then go back on the previous course to Tripoli; that he thought from the noise that torpedo bombers were coming, and he wanted to get in more open waters (farther away from the shore and the Italian minefields) to obtain more freedom of manoeuvre; or that he had spotted the Allied destroyers astern and, not wanting to present his stern to them (as the aft turrets were unusable and most fuel was stowed there), he decided to reverse course to fire on them with his bow turrets (upon ordering the change of course, he also ordered the gunners to keep ready).

Stokes's destroyers were, indeed, just off Cape Bon by then, and they had spotted the Italian ships. The course reversal accelerated the approach between the two groups, and the Allied destroyers attacked together; Sikh fired her guns and four torpedoes against Da Barbiano (the distance was less than 1,000 meters), Legion did the same, Isaac Sweers opened fire against Di Giussano. Toscano ordered full speed and to open fire (and also, to Di Giussano, to increase speed to 30 knots) and Da Barbiano also started a turn to port (on orders from the ship's commander, Captain Giorgio Rodocanacchi), but at 3.22, before her guns were able to fire (only some machine guns managed to), the cruiser was hit by a torpedo below the forwardmost turret, which caused her to list to port. Da Barbiano was then raked with machine gun fire, which killed or wounded many men and set fire to the fuel barrels, and hit by a second torpedo in the engine room. At 3.26 Maori also fired two torpedoes at Da Barbiano, and opened fire with her guns, hitting the bridge. Moments after, the cruiser was hit by another torpedo in the stern (possibly launched by Legion); meanwhile, Di Giussano was also hit and disabled. Da Barbiano rapidly listed to port, while the fires quickly spread all over the ship and also into the sea, fueled by the floating fuel, and the crew started to abandon ship. Leading seaman (sottocapo) Vincenzo Antro was presumably the last man to see Toscano alive; while descending on deck, he met a gravely wounded and barely standing Toscano, who asked for help. Antro carried the admiral on his back, left him near the floatplane hangar and then went forward to look for a raft or some more men who could help, but found neither; when he returned to Toscano, and his efforts to help him proved useless (Toscano was unable to move anymore), the admiral told Antro to leave him and save himself. Shortly thereafter, at 3:35, Da Barbiano capsized and sank in a sea of flame. Admiral Toscano was never seen again; he lost his life along with 533 more men from Da Barbiano and 283 from Di Giussano, which also sank a few hours later. He was posthumously awarded the Gold Medal of Military Valor.
