= Gerard Callenburgh-class destroyer =

Class of Dutch destroyers

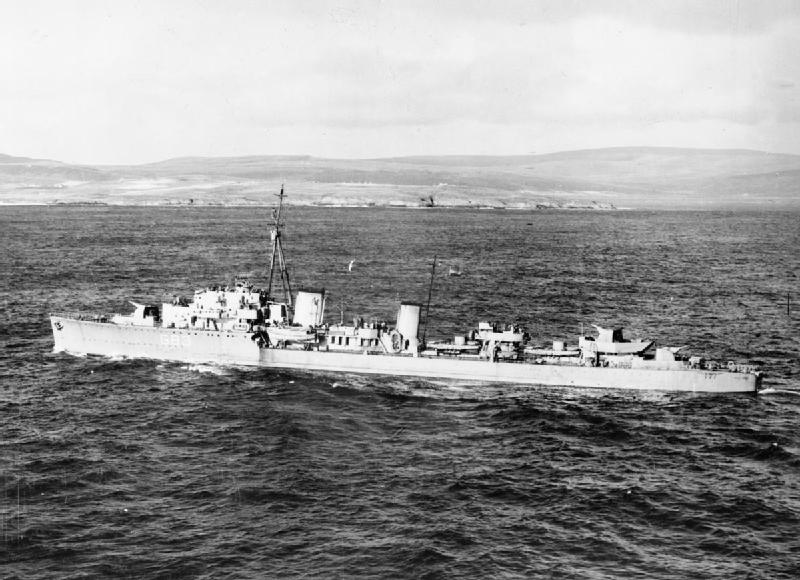
- Isaac Sweers, underway in 1942

Class overview
- Name: Gerard Callenburgh class
- Operators: Royal Netherlands Navy; Kriegsmarine
- Preceded by: Admiralen class
- Succeeded by: Holland class
- Built: 1937–1940
- In commission: 1941–1944
- Planned: 4
- Completed: 2
- Lost: 2

General characteristics as designed (see text)
- Type: Destroyer
- Displacement: 1,604 tons standard; 2,228 tons full load
- Length: 107 m (351 ft 1 in)
- Beam: 10.6 m (34 ft 9 in)
- Draft: 2.8 m (9 ft 2 in)
- Propulsion: 2 shaft, Parsons geared turbines; 3 Yarrow boilers; 45,000 hp (34,000 kW)
- Speed: 37.5 knots (69.5 km/h; 43.2 mph)
- Range: 3,200 nmi (5,900 km; 3,700 mi) at 15 kn (28 km/h; 17 mph)
- Complement: 158
- Armament: 5 × 120 mm (4.7 in) guns (2 × 2 & 1 × 1); 4 × 40 mm (1.6 in) AA guns; 4 × 12.7 mm (0.50 in)/62 Vickers Mk III machine guns; 8 × 533 mm (21.0 in) torpedo tubes (2 × 4); Mines & depth charges; (Note: When Gerard Callenburgh was taken by the Germans [ZH1] she had a different armament, and Isaac Sweers was completed in England)

The Gerard Callenburgh class were a group of four destroyers ordered for the Royal Netherlands Navy just before World War II. Two ships were completed - Gerard Callenburgh by the Germans after being captured and Isaac Sweers in Britain after being evacuated as the Netherlands fell to the Nazis.

== Design ==
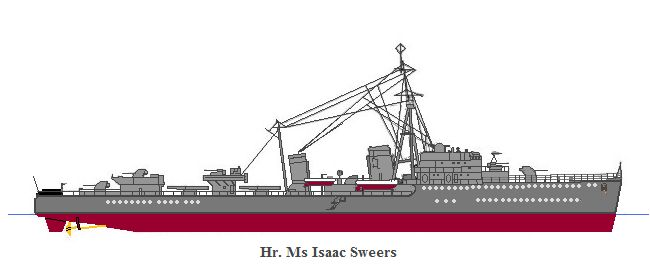
HNLMS Isaac Sweers as completed in 1941

These ships were larger than the preceding Admiralen-class destroyers. As those ships were outclassed by contemporary Japanese destroyers, the armament was increased to 5 guns with twin mounts in 'A' and 'Y' positions and a single gun in 'X' position. The torpedo outfit was also increased to two quadruple tubes. Isaac Sweers was completed in a British yard, with British armament and fire control equipment. She was fitted out with six 4-inch guns arranged in double turrets, four 40 mm Bofors and eight 0.5 in machine guns, as well as the customary eight torpedo tubes.

== Service ==
Only two ships were ever completed. Tjerk Hiddes was launched prior to the invasion, but was scuttled at Rotterdam to prevent her from falling into German hands. The Germans raised her, but found it impossible to repair her, so the wreckage was scrapped. Philips Van Almonde was demolished on the slipway after several attempts to launch her to be sailed to England had failed.

Gerard Callenburgh was also scuttled, but the Germans were able to salvage her. She was subsequently completed by Blohm & Voss, retaining most of the Dutch armament and equipment which had been installed prior to her scuttling, and was commissioned as ZH1 on 11 October 1942. She spent most of her career on trials in the Baltic but was transferred to Western France via the English Channel in November 1943. She was one of the German ships sent to intercept the Operation Neptune invasion armada, but they were themselves engaged by a squadron consisting of Tartar, Ashanti, Eskimo, Javelin, Haida, Huron and Błyskawica). ZH1 was torpedoed and badly damaged by Ashanti on 9 June 1944, and was scuttled with the loss of 33 men.

Isaac Sweers was, unlike her sister Philips Van Almonde, launched and then towed to England by the tug Zwarte Zee. She was completed in England by John I. Thornycroft & Company using British armament and fire control equipment. She went on to serve in the Mediterranean Sea with Force H. In December 1941, together with Sikh, Maori and Legion she sank the Italian cruisers Alberico da Barbiano and Alberto di Giussano in the Battle of Cape Bon. She then briefly served in the Indian Ocean with the Eastern Fleet. She was sunk by U-431, commanded by Wilhelm Dommes on 13 November 1942, in the Western Mediterranean, with the loss of 108 men.

== Ships ==
Construction data
Name	Builder	Laid down	Launched	Commissioned	Fate
Gerard Callenburgh	RDM	12 October 1938	12 October 1939	11 October 1942	Scuttled but salvaged; Commissioned as the German ZH1; Sunk, 9 June 1944
Isaac Sweers	KM de Schelde	26 November 1938	16 March 1940	29 May 1941	Towed to England and completed; Sunk, 13 November 1942
Tjerk Hiddes	RDM	1 October 1938	12 October 1939	—N/a	Scuttled, 15 May 1940; Wreck scrapped by Germany
Philips van Almonde	KM de Schelde	2 March 1939	—N/a	—N/a	Demolished on the slipway; 17 May 1940; Wreck scrapped by Germany

== See also ==
- List of destroyers of the Netherlands

== Citations ==
=== General references ===
- M. J. Whitley, Destroyers of World War 2, 1988 Cassell Publishing ISBN 1-85409-521-8
- Page on Callenburgh from Uboat.net
- Page on Isaac Sweers from Uboat.net
- Page on Isaac Sweers from the Dutch Navy
- Page from Dutch Destroyers
- Technical page from the Dutch navy
