= Sweers =

Sweers may refer to:

== People ==
- Isaac Sweers (1622–1673), Dutch vice-admiral
- Salomon Sweers (1611–1674), Dutch bookkeeper and counsel for the Dutch East India Company

== Other ==
- Sweers Island, an island in Queensland, Australia
- HNLMS Isaac Sweers (1940), a Gerard Callenburgh-class destroyer
- HNLMS Isaac Sweers (1967), a Van Speijk-class frigate
