= HNLMS Isaac Sweers =

HNLMS Isaac Sweers (Dutch: Hr.Ms. or Zr.Ms. Isaac Sweers) may refer to following ships of the Royal Netherlands Navy:

- HNLMS Isaac Sweers (1940), a Gerard Callenburgh-class destroyer
- HNLMS Isaac Sweers (F814), a Van Speijk-class frigate
