= Battle of Cape Bon =

The Battle of Cape Bon may refer to:

- Battle of Cape Bon (468), where the Vandals under Gaiseric defeated Eastern Roman General Basiliscus
- Battle of Cape Bon (1941), battle during World War II between two Italian light cruisers and an Allied destroyer flotilla
