= HMS Sikh (F82) =

Destroyer of the Royal Navy

Coordinates: 32°5′52″N 24°0′0″E

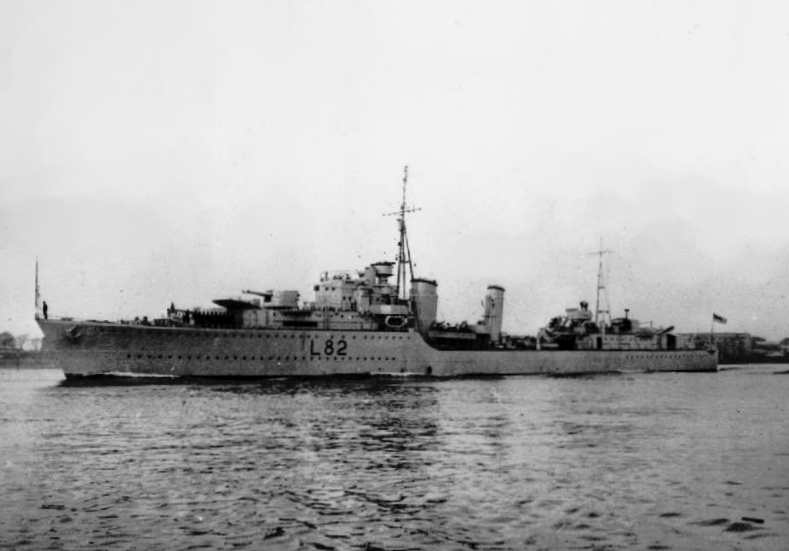
- Sikh underway after completion

History

United Kingdom
- Name: Sikh
- Namesake: Sikh
- Ordered: 19 June 1936
- Builder: Alexander Stephen and Sons, Linthouse
- Laid down: 24 September 1936
- Launched: 17 December 1937
- Commissioned: 12 October 1938
- Identification: Pennant numbers: L82/F82/G82
- Motto: Sicut leonis: 'Be like the lions'
- Honours and awards: Norway 1940; Atlantic 1940–41; Bismarck Action 1941; Cape Bon 1941; Libya 1941; Malta Convoys 1941–42; Sirte 1942; Mediterranean 1942
- Fate: Sunk, 14 September 1942

General characteristics (as built)
- Class & type: Tribal-class destroyer
- Displacement: 1,891 long tons (1,921 t) (standard); 2,519 long tons (2,559 t) (deep load)
- Length: 377 ft (114.9 m) (o/a)
- Beam: 36 ft 6 in (11.13 m)
- Draught: 11 ft 3 in (3.43 m)
- Installed power: 3 × Admiralty 3-drum boilers; 44,000 shp (33,000 kW)
- Propulsion: 2 × shafts; 2 × geared steam turbines
- Speed: 36 knots (67 km/h; 41 mph)
- Range: 5,700 nmi (10,600 km; 6,600 mi) at 15 knots (28 km/h; 17 mph)
- Complement: 190
- Sensors & processing systems: ASDIC
- Armament: 4 × twin 4.7 in (120 mm) guns; 1 × quadruple 2-pdr (40 mm (1.6 in)) AA guns; 2 × quadruple 0.5 in (12.7 mm) anti-aircraft machineguns; 1 × quadruple 21 in (533 mm) torpedo tubes; 20 × depth charges, 1 × rack, 2 × throwers

HMS Sikh was a Tribal-class destroyer of the British Royal Navy. The ship entered service in 1938 and served during the Second World War, participating in the sinking of Bismarck and the Battle of Cape Bon. In 1942, while participating in a commando raid, Sikh was sunk by a combination of shore artillery, anti-aircraft guns and aerial bombs.

== Description ==
The Tribals were intended to counter the large destroyers being built abroad and to improve the firepower of the existing destroyer flotillas and were thus significantly larger and more heavily armed than the preceding I class. The ships displaced 1,891 long tons (1,921 t) at standard load and 2,519 long tons (2,559 t) at deep load. They had an overall length of 377 feet (114.9 m), a beam of 36 feet 6 inches (11.13 m) and a draught of 11 feet 3 inches (3.43 m). The destroyers were powered by two Parsons geared steam turbines, each driving one propeller shaft using steam provided by three Admiralty three-drum boilers. The turbines developed a total of 44,000 shaft horsepower (33,000 kW) and gave a maximum speed of 36 knots (67 km/h; 41 mph). During her sea trials Sikh made 36.3 knots (67.2 km/h; 41.8 mph) from 44,428 shp (33,130 kW) at a displacement of 2,015 long tons (2,047 t). The ships carried enough fuel oil to give them a range of 5,700 nautical miles (10,600 km; 6,600 mi) at 15 knots (28 km/h; 17 mph). The ships' complement consisted of 190 officers and ratings, although the flotilla leaders carried an extra 20 officers and men consisting of the Captain (D) and his staff.

The primary armament of the Tribal-class destroyers was eight quick-firing (QF) 4.7-inch (120 mm) Mark XII guns in four superfiring twin-gun mounts, one pair each fore and aft of the superstructure, designated 'A', 'B', 'X', and 'Y' from front to rear. The mounts had a maximum elevation of 40°. For anti-aircraft (AA) defence, they carried a single quadruple mount for the 40-millimetre (1.6 in) QF two-pounder Mk II "pom-pom" gun and two quadruple mounts for the 0.5-inch (12.7 mm) Mark III machine gun. Low-angle fire for the main guns was controlled by the director-control tower (DCT) on the bridge roof that fed data acquired by it and the 12-foot (3.7 m) rangefinder on the Mk II Rangefinder/Director directly aft of the DCT to an analogue mechanical computer, the Mk I Admiralty Fire Control Clock. Anti-aircraft fire for the main guns was controlled by the Rangefinder/Director which sent data to the mechanical Fuze Keeping Clock.

The ships were fitted with a single above-water quadruple mount for 21-inch (533 mm) torpedoes. The Tribals were not intended as anti-submarine ships, but they were provided with ASDIC, one depth charge rack and two throwers for self-defence, although the throwers were not mounted in all ships; Twenty depth charges was the peacetime allotment, but this increased to 30 during wartime.

=== Wartime modifications ===
Heavy losses to German air attack during the Norwegian Campaign demonstrated the ineffectiveness of the Tribals' anti-aircraft suite and the RN decided in May 1940 to replace 'X' mount with two QF 4-inch (102 mm) Mark XVI dual-purpose guns in a twin-gun mount. To better control the guns, the existing rangefinder/director was modified to accept a Type 285 gunnery radar as they became available. The number of depth charges was increased to 46 early in the war, and still more were added later. To increase the firing arcs of the AA guns, the rear funnel was shortened and the mainmast was reduced to a short pole mast.

== Construction and career ==
Authorized as one of nine Tribal-class destroyers under the 1936 Naval Estimates, Sikh was the second ship of her name to serve in the Royal Navy. The ship was ordered on 19 June 1936 from Alexander Stephen and Sons and was laid down on 24 September at the company's Linthouse shipyard. Launched on 8 June 1937, Sikh was commissioned on 12 October 1938 at a cost of £337,704 which excluded weapons and communications outfits furnished by the Admiralty. The ship entered service as part of the 4th Destroyer Flotilla of the Royal Navy.

In 1941, while under the command of Commander Stokes, she took part in the sinking of the German battleship Bismarck. The night before Bismarck was sunk, she fired a salvo of four torpedoes and claimed a hit after hearing underwater explosions, but actually there were no hits.

Sikh transferred to the Mediterranean serving as part of Force H. On 13 December 1941, Sikh – together with Legion, Maori and the Dutch vessel HNLMS Isaac Sweers – sank the Italian cruisers Alberico da Barbiano and Alberto di Giussano in the Battle of Cape Bon.

On 4 August 1942, Sikh together with Zulu, Croome and Tetcott sank the German submarine U-372 off Haifa.

On 14 September, Sikh and Zulu landed and then covered Operation Agreement, a commando raid on Tobruk. Sikh was hit repeatedly, apparently principally by 152 mm, 145 mm and 120 mm Italian coastal artillery (though British sources sometimes attribute the fire entirely to German 88 mm guns), and may have also been bombed by a Macchi C.200, and hit by scuttling fire from HMS Croome – 115 men were lost and many more were taken prisoner, the majority of them when the Royal Marine landing craft that had rescued them was captured by an Italian MZ lighter. Zulu was damaged and sunk by aerial bombing the following day.

== Sources ==
- Brice, Martin H. (1971). The Tribals. London: Ian Allan. ISBN 0-7110-0245-2.
- English, John (2001). Afridi to Nizam: British Fleet Destroyers 1937–43. Gravesend, Kent: World Ship Society. ISBN 0-905617-64-9.
- Friedman, Norman (2006). British Destroyers and Frigates, the Second World War and After. Annapolis, Maryland: Naval Institute Press. ISBN 1-86176-137-6.
- Haarr, Geirr H. (2010). The Battle for Norway: April–June 1940. Annapolis, Maryland: Naval Institute Press. ISBN 978-1-59114-051-1.
- Haarr, Geirr H. (2009). The German Invasion of Norway, April 1940. Annapolis, Maryland: Naval Institute Press. ISBN 978-1-59114-310-9.
- Hodges, Peter (1971). Tribal Class Destroyers. London: Almark. ISBN 0-85524-047-4.
- Lenton, H. T. (1998). British & Empire Warships of the Second World War. Annapolis, Maryland: Naval Institute Press. ISBN 1-55750-048-7.
- Mattesini, Francesco (March 2013). "L'Operazione "Daffodil" nel Piano "Agreement". Il fallito sbarco britannico a Tobruch del 14 settembre 1942". Bollettino d'Archivio dell'Ufficio Storico della Marina Militare. 27: 81–143.
- Mattesini, Francesco (2020). Il disastro di Tobruk. Zanica, Italy: Soldiershop Publishing. ISBN 978-8-8932-7628-3.
- Rohwer, Jürgen (2005). Chronology of the War at Sea 1939–1945: The Naval History of World War Two (Third Revised ed.). Annapolis, Maryland: Naval Institute Press. ISBN 1-59114-119-2.
- Smith, Peter C. (2008). Massacre at Tobruk. The British Assault on Rommel, 1942 (Paperback ed.). Mechanicsburg, Pennsylvania: Stackpole Books. ISBN 978-0-8117-5163-6.
- Whitley, M. J. (1988). Destroyers of World War Two: An International Encyclopedia. Annapolis, Maryland: Naval Institute Press. ISBN 0-87021-326-1.
