= Isaac Sweers =

Dutch naval commander (1622–1673)

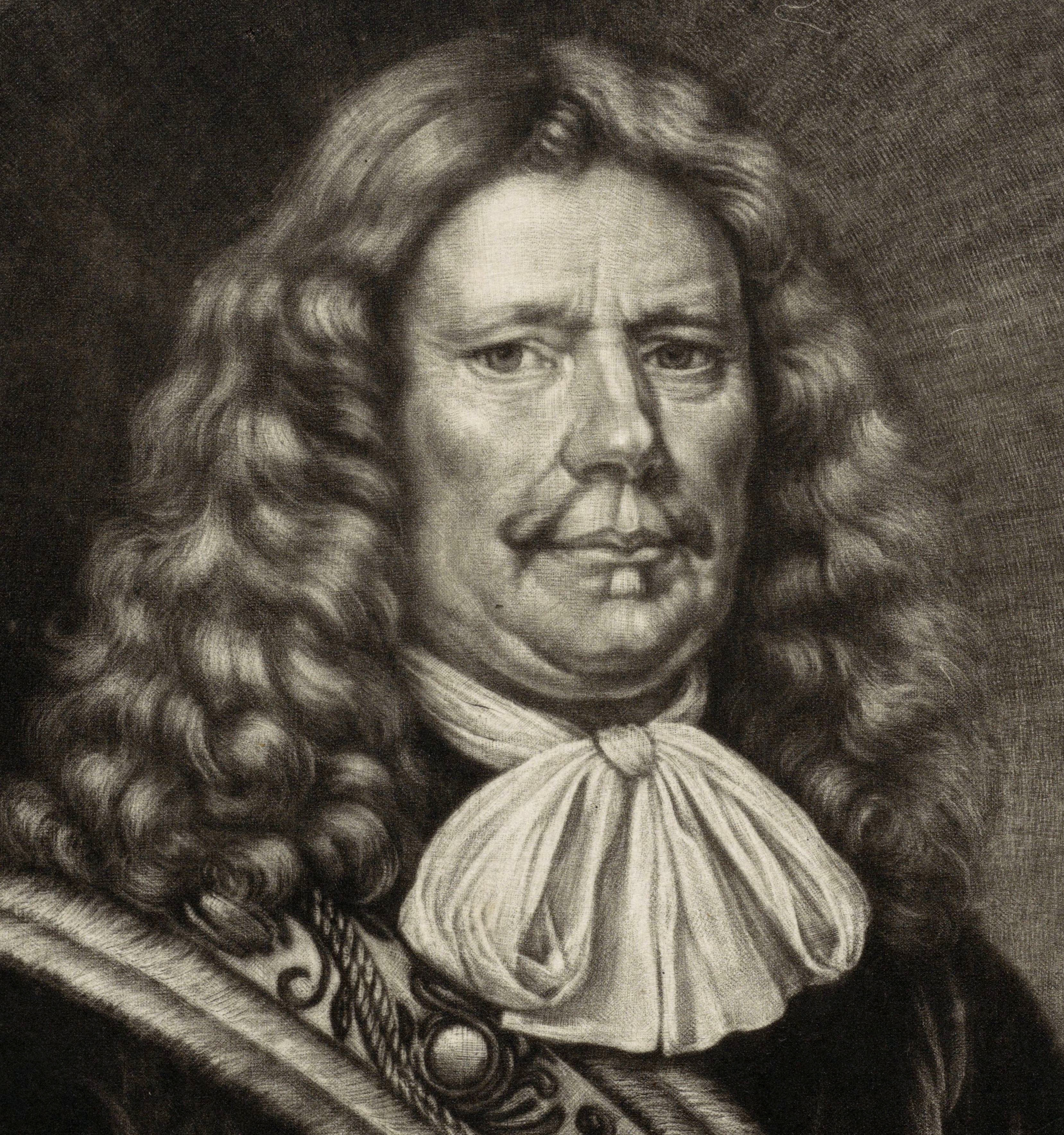
- Sweers before 1673, by B. Vaillant
- Born: 1 January 1622; Nijmegen, Dutch Republic
- Died: 22 August 1673 (aged 51) off Texel, Dutch Republic
- Relatives: Salomon Sweers (brother)
- Military career
- Allegiance: Dutch Republic
- Branch: Admiralty of Amsterdam
- Years of service: 1649–1673
- Rank: Vice-admiral
- Wars: First Anglo-Dutch War; Battle of Portland; Second Anglo-Dutch War; Battle of the Sound; Four Days' Battle; St. James's Day Battle; Third Anglo-Dutch War; Battle of Solebay; Franco-Dutch War; Battle of Kijkduin †

Isaac Sweers (occasionally Ysaack Sweerts; 1 January 1622 – 22 August 1673) was a 17th-century Dutch vice-admiral with the Admiralty of Amsterdam who fought in the Anglo-Dutch Wars.

HNLMS Isaac Sweers was a Gerard Callenburgh-class destroyer of the Royal Netherlands Navy, named after Sweers.

== Bibliography ==
- Bruijn, J. R., ed. (1966). "Dagregister van Isaäc Sweers". De oorlogvoering ter zee in 1673 (in Dutch). Groningen: Wolters. pp. 106–155. OCLC 780639117.
- Herman, H. (1921). "Sweers, Isaac". Nieuw Nederlandsch Biografisch Woordenboek (in Dutch). Vol. 5. Leiden: Sijthoff. pp. 850–851. OCLC 277609365.
- Van der Aa, A. (1874). "Sweerts, Ysaack". Biographisch Woordenboek der Nederlanden (in Dutch). Vol. 17. Haarlem: Brederode. pp. 1113–1114. OCLC 312812085.
