= Italian cruiser Alberico da Barbiano =

Italian Giussano-class light cruiser

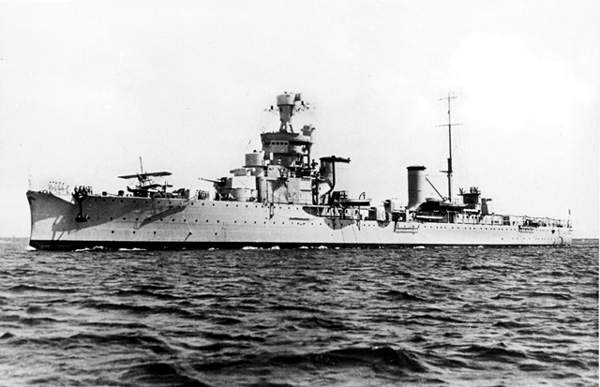
- Cruiser Alberico da Barbiano in Venice

History

Italy
- Name: Alberico da Barbiano
- Namesake: Alberico da Barbiano
- Builder: Ansaldo, Genoa
- Laid down: 16 April 1928
- Launched: 23 August 1930
- Commissioned: 9 June 1931
- Fate: Sunk at the Battle of Cape Bon, 13 December 1941

General characteristics
- Class & type: Giussano-class cruiser
- Displacement: 6,571 tonnes (6,467 long tons) (standard); 6,954 tonnes (6,844 long tons) (full load)
- Length: 169.3 m (555 ft 5 in)
- Beam: 15.5 m (50 ft 10 in)
- Draught: 5.3 m (17 ft 5 in)
- Propulsion: 6 boilers; 2 shafts; 95,000 hp (71,000 kW)
- Speed: 37 knots (69 km/h; 43 mph)
- Range: 3,800 nmi (7,000 km) at 18 kn (33 km/h; 21 mph)
- Complement: 507
- Armament: 8 × 152 mm (6 in) /53 guns in 4 twin mountings; 6 × 100 mm (4 in) / 47 caliber guns in 3 twin mountings; 8 × 37 mm (1.5 in) 54-cal. guns; 8 × 13.2 mm machine-guns; 4 × 533 mm (21 in) torpedo tubes
- Armour: Decks: 20 mm (0.79 in); Belt: 24 mm (0.94 in); Turrets: 23 mm (0.91 in); Tower: 40 mm (1.6 in)
- Aircraft carried: 2 × CANT 25AR (later Ro.43) seaplanes
- Aviation facilities: 1 × catapult launcher

Alberico da Barbiano was an Italian Giussano-class light cruiser, that served in the Regia Marina during World War II. She was named after Alberico da Barbiano, an Italian condottiero of the 14th century.

== Construction ==
Da Barbiano was launched on 23 August 1930. During her trials she managed to reach a speed of 42.05 knots (77.88 km/h; 48.39 mph), but to do that the propulsion was pushed to 123,479 horsepower (92,078 kW), far beyond the safety limits. She could only maintain this speed for about 30 minutes.

== Service history ==
During the late 1930s, Da Barbiano participated in the Spanish Civil War, escorting Italian ships that carried supplies for the Spanish Nationalist forces the Western Mediterranean.

During World War II, Alberico Da Barbiano was part of the 4th Cruiser Division. On 9 July 1940 Da Barbiano was present at the Battle of Calabria (Punto Stilo). In summer 1940 she also participated in some escort and minelaying missions between Italy and North Africa. Due to the weakness of the class, on 1 September 1940 she was assigned as a training ship in Pola, but on 1 March 1941 was returned to active service.

In December 1941 the Italian naval staff, in the face of a deteriorating supply situation between Italy and Libya, decided to use the 4th Cruiser Division, then composed of Da Barbiano (flagship of ammiraglio di divisione Antonino Toscano, the commander of the Division) and her sister ship Alberto di Giussano, for an urgent transport mission to North Africa.

Da Barbiano and Di Giussano left Taranto at 8:15 on 5 December 1941, reached Brindisi at 17:50 and there loaded about 50 tons of supplies, then proceeded to Palermo on 8 December, where they loaded an additional 22 tons of aviation fuel, which was especially needed in Libya (otherwise, aircraft based there would soon become unable to escort incoming convoys). The fuel, contained in unsealed barrels, was placed on the stern deck, thus posing great danger in case of enemy attacks (not only it would be set afire by mere strafing, but even by the flames of the ships' own guns, thus preventing the use of the stern turrets). The two cruisers sailed unescorted from Palermo at 17:20 on 9 December, heading for Tripoli, but at 22:56 they were spotted by a British reconnaissance plane north of Pantelleria. The plane, which had located Toscano's ships thanks to Ultra intercepts, started to shadow them. At 23:55 Toscano (who was at that time in the middle of the Sicilian Channel), since the surprise (required for the success of the mission) had vanished, heavy enemy radio traffic foreshadowed air strikes, and worsening sea conditions would delay his ships, further exposing them to British attacks, decided to turn back to base. Da Barbiano and Di Giussano reached Palermo at 8:20 on 10 December, after overcoming a British air attack off Marettimo. Toscano was heavily criticised by Supermarina for his decision to abort the mission.

As for 13 December a new convoy operation, called M. 41, was planned, and the air cover by aircraft based in Libya would only be possible if they received new fuel, on 12 December it was decided that the 4th Division would attempt again the trip to Tripoli. The cruiser Giovanni delle Bande Nere was to join Da Barbiano and Di Giussano to carry more supplies, but she was prevented from sailing by a breakdown, thus her cargo had to be transferred to the other two cruisers. Da Barbiano and Di Giussano were overall loaded with 100 tons of aviation fuel, 250 tons of gasoline, 600 tons of naphtha and 900 tons of food stores, as well as 135 ratings on passage to Tripoli. As the stern of Da Barbiano (and, to a lesser extent, Di Giussano) was packed with fuel barrels, so thickly that it was not possible any more to bring the guns to bear, Toscano held a last assembly with his staff and officers from both ships, where it was decided that, in case of encounter with enemy ships, the barrels would be discarded overboard, and then the cruisers would open fire (otherwise, the fuel would have been set afire by the firing of the cruisers' own guns). Da Barbiano, Di Giussano and their only escort, the torpedo boat Cigno (a second torpedo boat, Climene, was left in the port due to a breakdown), sailed from Palermo at 18:10 on 12 December. The 4th Division was ordered to pass northwest of the Aegadian Islands and then head for Cape Bon and follow the Tunisian coast; the ships would keep a speed of 22-23 knots (not more, because they were to spare part of their own fuel and deliver it at Tripoli). Air cover, air reconnaissance and defensive MAS ambushes were planned to safeguard the mission.

The British 4th Destroyer Flotilla, consisting of the destroyers HMS Sikh, HMS Maori, HMS Legion and the Dutch destroyer HNLMS Isaac Sweers, (Commander G. H. Stokes), had departed Gibraltar on 11 December, to join the Mediterranean Fleet at Alexandria. By 8 December, the British had de-coded Italian C-38 wireless signals about the Italian supply operation and its course for Tripoli. The RAF sent a Wellington bomber on a reconnaissance sortie to sight the ships as a deception and on 12 December, the 4th Destroyer Flotilla, heading east from Gibraltar towards the Italian ships, was ordered to increase speed to 30 knots (56 km/h; 35 mph) and intercept. In the afternoon of 12 December, a CANT Z. 1007 bis of Regia Aeronautica spotted the four destroyers heading east at an estimated speed of 20 knots, 60 miles (97 km) off Algiers; Supermarina was immediately informed but calculated that, even in the case the destroyers would increase their speed to 28 knots, they would have reached Cape Bon around 3:00 AM on 13 December, about one hour after the 4th Division, so Toscano (who learned of the sighting while he was still in harbour) was not ordered to increase speed or alter course to avoid them. Following new Ultra decodes, a new reconnaissance plane was sent and spotted Toscano's ships at sunset on 12 December, after which the 4th Destroyer Flotilla was directed to intercept the two cruisers, increasing speed to 30 knots. This speed, along with a one-hour delay that the 4th Division had accrued (and that Toscano omitted to report to Supermarina), frustrated all previous Supermarina calculations about the advantage that the 4th Division would have. At 22:23 Toscano was informed that he would possibly meet "enemy steamers coming from Malta", and at 23:15 he ordered action stations.

The 4th Destroyer Flotilla sighted the Italian cruisers near Cap Bon, at 02:30 on 13 December. At 2:45 on 13 December, seven miles off Cape Bon, the Italian ships heard the noise of a British plane (a radar-equipped Vickers Wellington, which located the ships and informed Stokes about their position), and at 3:15 they altered course to 157° to pass about one mile off Cape Bon. Five minutes later, Toscano suddenly ordered full speed ahead and to alter course to 337°, effectively reversing course; this sudden change disrupted the Italian formation, as neither Cigno (which was about two miles ahead of the cruisers) neither Di Giussano (which was following Da Barbiano in line) received the order, and while Di Giussano saw the flagship reverse course and imitated her (but remained misaligned), Cigno did not noticed the change till 3:25, when she also reversed course, but remained much behind the two cruisers. The reasons for Toscano's decision of reverse course have never been fully explained: it has been suggested that, upon realising that he had been spotted by aircraft, he decided to turn back like on 9 December (but in this case, a course towards the Aegadian islands would have made more sense, instead that the northwesterly course ordered by Toscano; and the change was suddenly ordered more than 30 minutes after the cruisers had been spotted); that he wanted to mislead the reconnaissance plane about his real course, wait for it to go away, and then go back on the previous course to Tripoli; that he thought from the noise that torpedo bombers were coming, and he wanted to get in more open waters (farther away from the shore and the Italian minefields) to obtain more freedom of manoeuvre; or that he had spotted the Allied destroyers astern and, not wanting to present his stern to them (as the aft turrets were unusable and most fuel was stowed there), he decided to reverse course to fire on them with his bow turrets (upon ordering the change of course, he also ordered the gunners to keep ready).

Stokes's destroyers were, indeed, just off Cape Bon by then, and they had spotted the Italian ships. Arriving from astern, under the cover of darkness and using radar, the British ships sailed close inshore and surprised the Italians who were further out to sea, by launching torpedoes from short range. The course reversal accelerated the approach between the two groups, and the Allied destroyers attacked together; Sikh fired her guns and four torpedoes against Da Barbiano (the distance was less than 1,000 meters) and Legion did the same, while Maori and Isaac Sweers attacked Di Giussano. Toscano ordered full speed and to open fire (and also, to Di Giussano, to increase speed to 30 knots) and Da Barbiano also started a turn to port (on orders from the ship's commanding officer, Captain Giorgio Rodocanacchi), but at 3:22, before her guns were able to fire (only some machine guns managed to), the cruiser was hit by a torpedo below the forwardmost turret, which caused her to list to port. Da Barbiano was then raked with machine gun fire, which killed or wounded many men and set fire to the fuel barrels, and hit by a second torpedo in the engine room. At 3.26 Maori also fired two torpedoes at Da Barbiano, and opened fire with her guns, hitting the bridge. Moments after, the cruiser was hit by another torpedo in the stern (possibly launched by Legion); meanwhile, Di Giussano was disabled as well. Da Barbiano rapidly listed to port, while the fires quickly spread all over the ship and also into the sea, fuelled by the floating fuel, and the crew started to abandon ship. At 3:35, Da Barbiano capsized and sank in a sea of flame. 534 men, including Admiral Antonino Toscano, the commander of Italian Fourth Naval Division, his entire staff and the commanding officer of Alberico Da Barbiano, Captain Giorgio Rodocanacchi, were lost with the ship. 250 survivors reached the Tunisian coast or were picked up by rescuing vessels.

Da Barbiano's wreck was located in 2007 by an Italian expedition.
