= HMS Porcupine (G93) =

1941 O and P-class destroyer

- "HMS Pork", the front half of HMS Porcupine

History

United Kingdom
- Name: HMS Porcupine
- Ordered: 20 October 1939
- Builder: Vickers-Armstrongs
- Laid down: 26 December 1939
- Launched: 10 June 1941
- Commissioned: 31 August 1942
- Nickname(s): HMS Pork and HMS Pine
- Fate: Torpedoed and crippled. Cut into two by the Royal Navy. Both halves converted into two individual accommodation hulks known as HMS Pork and HMS Pine.

General characteristics
- Class & type: P-class destroyer

HMS Porcupine was a P-class destroyer built by Vickers-Armstrongs on the River Tyne. She was ordered on 20 October 1939, laid down on 26 December 1939 and launched on 10 June 1941. She was commissioned on 31 August 1942, but had a relatively short active career. She was torpedoed in 1942 but salvaged and not finally broken up until 1947.

== Career ==
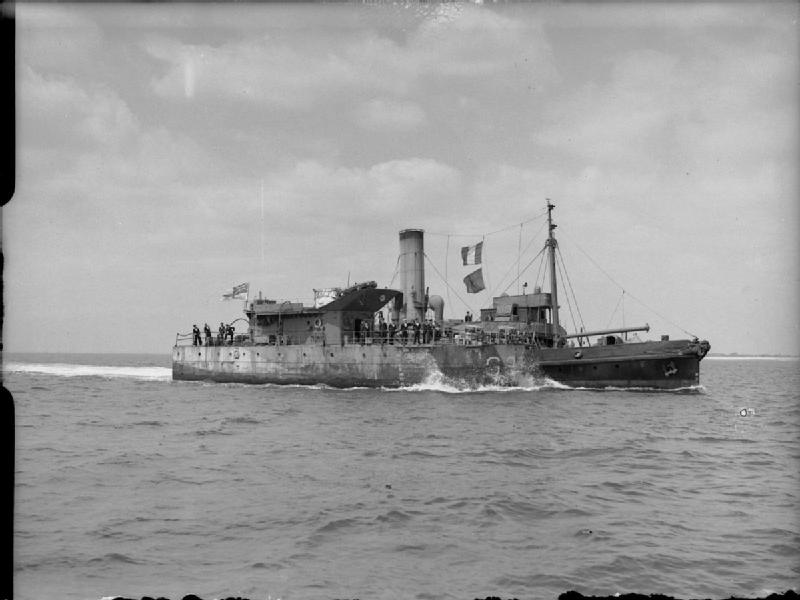
The stern of Porcupine, later commissioned as HMS Pine, being towed into Portsmouth

On 11 November 1942, along with the Dutch destroyer Isaac Sweers, Porcupine helped rescue 241 men from the ship Nieuw Zeeland, a Dutch troop transport that had been torpedoed by the German submarine U-380 at 35°57′N 03°58′W – about 80 miles (130 km) east of Gibraltar, in the Mediterranean Sea.

Porcupine was under the command of Commander George Scott Stewart when the German submarine U-602 torpedoed her whilst she was escorting the depot ship Maidstone from Gibraltar to Algiers on 9 December 1942. U-602 fired four torpedoes at Maidstone, one of which hit Porcupine; the other three missed both British ships.

The attack killed seven men but left most of the ship intact – except for critical localised damage that nearly split the ship in two. The destroyer Vanoc rescued all of her crew except a skeleton contingent. After topweight was jettisoned in an attempt to reduce an increasing list, Exe took her in tow. The next day a French tug took over and delivered Porcupine to Arzew, Algeria.

In March 1943 she was towed to Oran, where she was declared a total loss. French dockworkers there cut the damaged ship into two halves before a decision was made to strip them of all guns, ammunition, mountings, stores, etc., and tow them to Britain. The two parts were ballasted and brought to Portsmouth in June.

Once the two pieces were back in Portsmouth, the fore part of the ship was known informally as HMS Pork, and the rear part as HMS Pine. Reconfigured as accommodation hulks, the two halves were commissioned under those names on 14 January 1944 as Landing Craft Base Stokes Bay, in Portsmouth. They were eventually paid off on 1 March 1946, before being recommissioned for the Commander of Minesweepers on 1 April 1946. Porcupine then became a tender to HMS Victory III.

== Fate ==
Porcupine was finally paid off on 31 August 1946. On 6 May 1946 she was listed as sold, and in 1947 broken up somewhere on the south coast of England – but reports differ as to whether or not this was at Plymouth, Portsmouth or Southampton.

== Bibliography ==
- Colledge, J. J.; Warlow, Ben (2006) [1969]. Ships of the Royal Navy: The Complete Record of All Fighting Ships of the Royal Navy from the 15th Century to the Present (3rd Rev ed.). London: Chatham Publishing. ISBN 978-1-86176-281-8. OCLC 67375475.
- English, John (2001). Obdurate to Daring: British Fleet Destroyers 1941–45. Windsor, UK: World Ship Society. ISBN 978-0-9560769-0-8.
- Friedman, Norman (2006). British Destroyers & Frigates: The Second World War and After. Annapolis, Maryland: Naval Institute Press. ISBN 1-86176-137-6.
- Lenton, H. T. (1998). British & Empire Warships of the Second World War. Annapolis, Maryland: Naval Institute Press. ISBN 1-55750-048-7.
- Raven, Alan & Roberts, John (1978). War Built Destroyers O to Z Classes. London: Bivouac Books. ISBN 0-85680-010-4.
- Rohwer, Jürgen (2005). Chronology of the War at Sea 1939–1945: The Naval History of World War Two (Third Revised ed.). Annapolis, Maryland: Naval Institute Press. ISBN 1-59114-119-2.
- Tomblin, Barbara (2004). With Utmost Spirit: Allied Naval Operations in the Mediterranean, 1942–1945. University Press of Kentucky. ISBN 978-0-8131-2338-7.
- Warlow, Ben (2000). Shore Establishments of the Royal Navy. Maritime Books. ISBN 978-0-907771-74-6.
- Whitley, M. J. (1988). Destroyers of World War Two: An International Encyclopedia. Annapolis, Maryland: Naval Institute Press. ISBN 0-87021-326-1.
