= HMS Legion (G74) =

Royal Navy ship

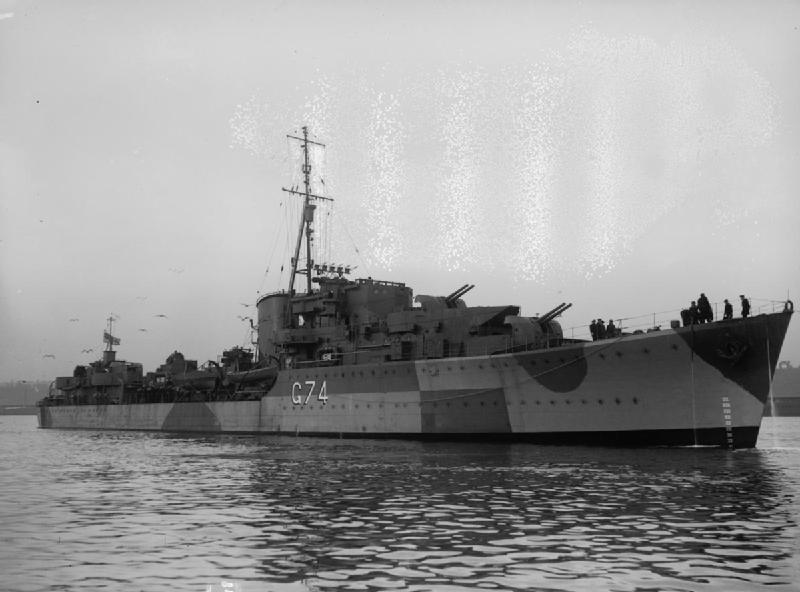
- HMS Legion at anchor

History

United Kingdom
- Name: HMS Legion
- Ordered: 31 March 1938
- Builder: Hawthorn Leslie and Company, Newcastle upon Tyne
- Laid down: 1 November 1938
- Launched: 26 December 1939
- Commissioned: 19 December 1940
- Identification: Pennant number: G74
- Fate: Sunk on 26 March 1942 in air attack
- Badge: On a Field Blue, an eagle displayed upon a perch Gold.

General characteristics
- Class & type: L-class destroyer
- Displacement: 1,920 tons
- Length: 362.5 ft (110.5 m)
- Beam: 36.7 ft (11.2 m)
- Draught: 10 ft (3.0 m)
- Propulsion: Two shafts; Two geared steam turbines; Two drum type boilers; 48,000 shp (35.8 MW)
- Speed: 36 kt (66.7 km/h)
- Range: 5,500 nmi (10,200 km) at 15 knots (28 km/h)
- Complement: 221
- Armament: 8 × QF 4-inch (100 mm) Mk.XVI guns, twin mount HA/LA Mk.XIX; 4 × QF 2 pdr Mk.VIII L/39 (40 mm), quad mount Mk.VII; 8 × QF 0.5 in Mk.III Vickers (12.7 mm), quad mounts Mk.III; 8 (2 × 4) tubes for 21 inch (533 mm) torpedoes Mk.IX

HMS Legion was an L-class destroyer of the Royal Navy. She entered service during the Second World War, and had a short but eventful career, serving in Home waters and the Mediterranean. She was sunk in an air attack on Malta in 1942. The ship had been adopted by the British civil community of the Municipal Borough of Cheltenham, Gloucestershire in November 1941.

== Construction and commissioning ==
Legion was ordered on 31 March 1938 from the yards of Hawthorn Leslie and Company, Newcastle upon Tyne under the 1937 Naval Estimates. She was laid down on 1 November 1938 and launched just over a year later on 26 December 1939. During 1940 her main armament along with three others of the L class was changed. Twin 4 inch HA mountings were fitted and these four ships were re-classified as anti-aircraft destroyers. She was commissioned on 19 December 1940 at a total cost of £445,684, which excluded items such as weapons and communications equipment supplied by the Admiralty. During trials, a number of defects were revealed, resulting in the ship being under repair at Greenock in Scotland until January 1941.

== Career ==
=== Home waters ===
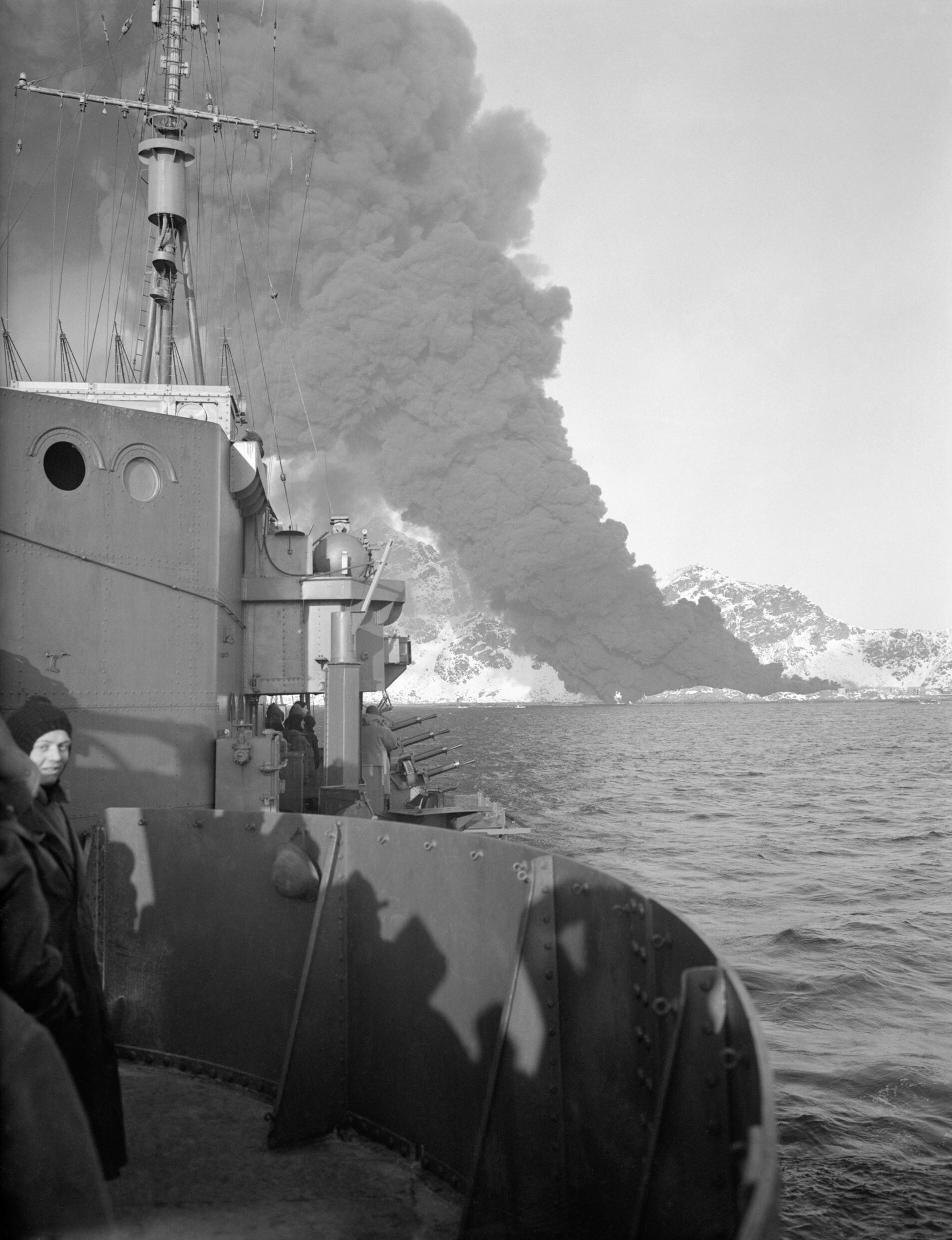
Thick clouds of black smoke as seen from Legion, during the expedition to the Lofoten islands, Norway, where troops were landed to blow up the oil tanks

On completion of repairs, Legion was assigned to the Western Approaches Command at Greenock as part of the 11th Escort Group. She was deployed on convoy defence duties, and also successfully trialled a modified Radar Type 286M using a rotating instead of fixed aerial array. In February she escorted military convoys through the North Western Approaches. She set sail in support of Operation Claymore, a commando raid on the Lofoten Islands, on 1 March. Following the successful completion of these duties, she joined the 14th Escort Group. On 13 April she rescued survivors from the armed merchant cruiser Rajputana which had been torpedoed in the North Western Approaches by the German submarine U-108. Legion rescued 177 men, although another 40 went down with Rajputana. The rest of April was spent escorting convoys.

In May she screened capital ships of the Home Fleet, searching for the German battleship Bismarck; but she had to refuel at Iceland, and so was not present at the sinking of the German battleship. Legion then returned to convoy escort duties.

On 22 June Legion and her sister Lance, escorted the aircraft carrier Furious to Gibraltar, on an operation to deliver aircraft to Malta. A few days later, (on 26 June), she and other destroyers screened the aircraft carrier Ark Royal, the battlecruiser Renown and the cruiser Hermione as they delivered aircraft from Gibraltar to Malta. This operation was repeated later in the month with Furious. In July Legion returned to Greenock to resume escort duties through the Western Approaches. On 20 August she was deployed to reinforce the escort of Convoy OG 71 which was on passage to the UK and had come under attack from the U-boats U-559, U-201 and U-564. The escorts were eventually successful in driving off the attackers; the convoy arrived at Liverpool on 25 August.

=== Malta convoys ===
In September she and her flotilla returned to Gibraltar and resumed escorting capital ships supplying aircraft to Malta. She provided cover on 24 September for the convoys of Operation Halberd. During the operation, the ships came under heavy air attack but continued onward. On her return to Gibraltar after Halberd, Legion and Gurkha attacked and sank the Italian submarine Adua with depth charges. October was spent escorting convoys to Malta. She made an unsuccessful attack on U-205 on 23 October and then rescued survivors from Cossack which had been torpedoed by U-563 west of Cape Spartel.

=== The sinking of HMS Ark Royal ===
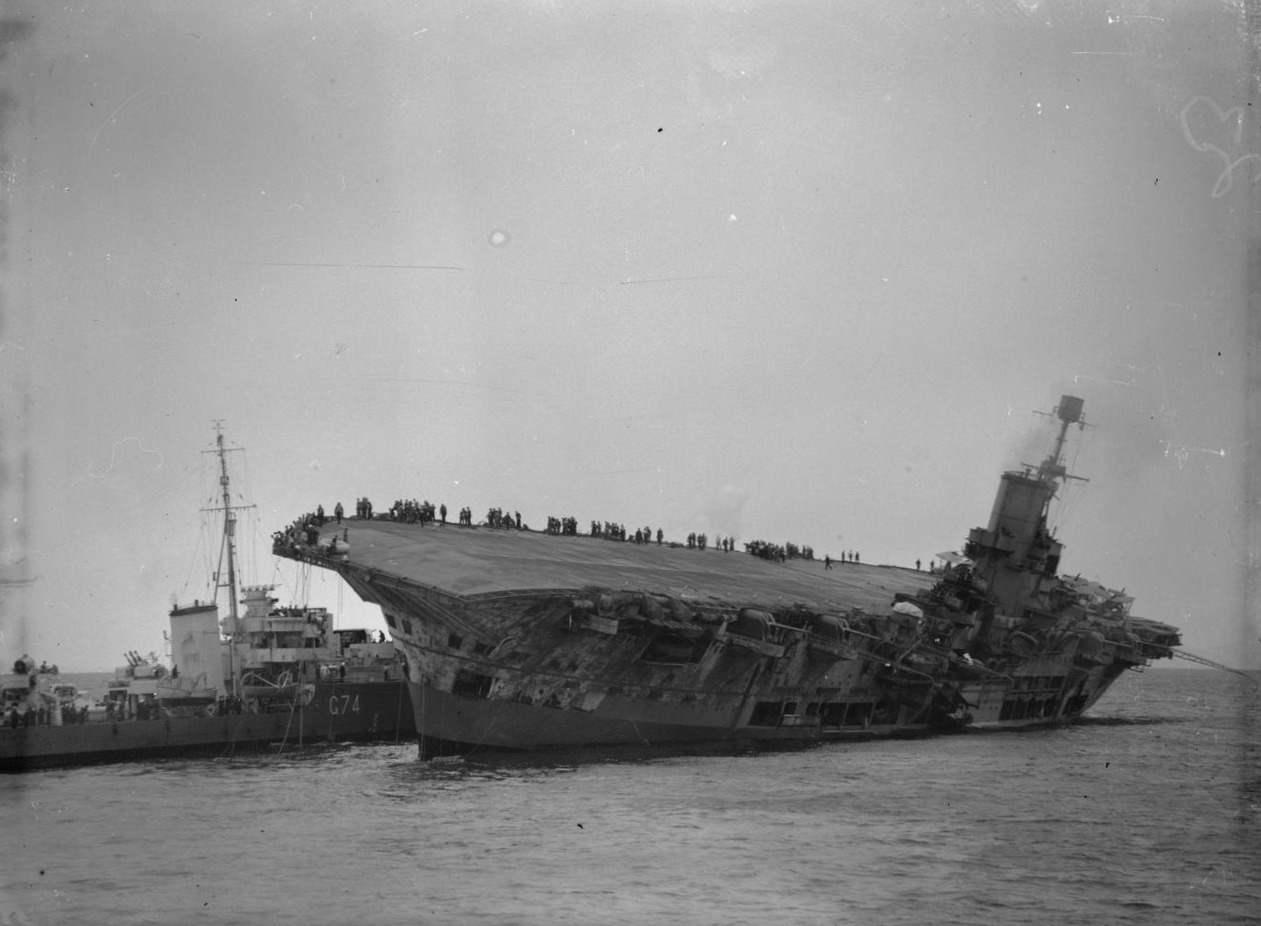
Legion moves alongside the damaged and listing Ark Royal in order to take off survivors

In November Legion was assigned to the 4th Destroyer Flotilla and escorted more convoys to Malta. On 13 November she was attacked by U-205 and carried out an unsuccessful counterattack. Meanwhile, Ark Royal was torpedoed by U-81 and disabled. Legion and her sister, Lightning stood by the stricken ship, embarking 1,560 survivors. Legion later returned to Ark Royal to transfer key personnel for damage control efforts.

=== Action in the Mediterranean ===
After Ark Royal sank under tow, Legion returned to Gibraltar, arriving on 24 November. In December she was transferred to Alexandria to serve as part of the Mediterranean Fleet. On 13 December she was part of the fleet when it intercepted the Italian cruisers Alberto di Giussano and Alberico da Barbiano. Both were sunk in the ensuing engagement, known as the Battle of Cape Bon. The torpedo boat Cigno was able to escape.

After this success the ship was deployed with Force K, to carry out attacks on Axis convoys on passage in the central Mediterranean in support of military operations. During her service with the Force she came under air attack in an engagement on 17 December that developed into the First Battle of Sirte. She then returned to Alexandria on 19 December with Force C. When the anti-submarine boom was raised to allow the ships to enter the harbour, the Italian submarine Sciré and three human torpedoes were able to penetrate into the secure anchorage. They laid explosive charges, severely damaging the battleships Queen Elizabeth and Valiant, and the tanker Savona. On 28 December Legion and Kipling sank U-75 off Mersa Matruh after a two and half hour hunt following the sinking of the merchant vessel Volo.

Legion continued to escort convoys throughout January 1942. She was attacked on 17 January by U-133 north of Bardia. Although she escaped damage, Gurkha was sunk. On 27 January she had her ASDIC (sonar) equipment repaired at Malta. This work lasted until mid-February, when she was transferred to the 22nd Destroyer Flotilla.

Further escorts of convoys followed. When one of her convoys was attacked by ships of the Italian Fleet, the Second Battle of Sirte developed, in which Legion carried out a torpedo attack. The Italians subsequently disengaged rather than risk further torpedo attacks.

== Sinking and scrapping ==
On 23 March Legion was detached to join Eridge in escorting the merchantman Clan Campbell. During this operation, the vessels came under air attack and Legion was damaged by a near miss. The ship proceeded on one engine after successful damage control prevented her from sinking and she was beached at Malta. She was then towed to the docks on 25 March and tied up alongside the Boiler Wharf the next day. Whilst awaiting repair, the docks were the target of an air raid. Legion was hit by two bombs and sustained further serious damage when her forward magazine exploded. She rolled over and sank in the harbour, with her bridge and funnel lying on the jetty.

She was cut in two during 1943 and attempts were made to refloat her. They were unsuccessful. After the end of the war, she was broken up in situ. This was not completed until 1946.
