= Battle of Cape Bon (1941) =

Naval battle of Tunisia during WWII

- Part of the Battle of the Mediterranean of the Second World War
- Italian light cruiser Alberto di Giussano, c. 1930
Date	13 December 1941
Location	Off Cape Bon, Mediterranean Sea 36°45′N 10°45′E
Result	Allied victory

Belligerents
United Kingdom; Netherlands	Italy

Commanders and leaders
Graham Stokes	Antonino Toscano †

Strength
4th Destroyer Flotilla; (4 destroyers)	4th Cruiser Division; 2 light cruisers; 1 torpedo boat

Casualties and losses
Nil	817 killed; 2 light cruisers sunk

The naval Battle of Cape Bon took place on 13 December 1941 during the Second World War, between two Italian light cruisers and a British–Dutch destroyer flotilla, off Cape Bon in Tunisia.

The Italian cruisers were making a fast run to Libya to deliver aviation fuel and other freight that was urgently needed. Three British and a Dutch destroyers of the 4th Destroyer Flotilla were on transit from Gibraltar to Alexandria to join the Mediterranean Fleet when they were diverted to attack the cruisers.

The destroyers hugged the shore, where they were invisible from the sea and ambushed the cruisers, sinking both with about 900 men killed. The four destroyers continued their voyage to Alexandria.

== Background ==
=== Regia Marina ===
When Italy declared war in June 1940, the Regia Marina was one of the largest navies in the world but it was restricted to operations in the Mediterranean. The British Empire possessed enough resources and naval might to maintain two fleets in the Mediterranean and replace most losses. This led to caution by the Italian command and a tendency to avoid conflict. Control of the Mediterranean was disputed by the Regia Marina, the Royal Navy and their allies. The sea was vital for the supply of the Italian and German forces in North Africa, as well as the maintenance of Malta as a British offensive base. Without Malta, it would have been much harder for the British to intercept Italian supply convoys.

=== Signals intelligence ===
The possession of radar and the breaking of Italian codes, particularly the C38 m Hagelin cipher machine, used by the Regia Marina, further contributed to British success. In November 1941, the supply of the Axis forces in Libya from Italy had been interrupted by Force K from Malta, that had destroyed several Italian convoys, notably in the Battle of the Duisburg Convoy and the loss of nearly 70 per cent of the supplies sent to Libya, including 92 per cent of the fuel. Force K and ships from Alexandria, intercepted an Axis convoy consisting of the German transports Maritza (2,910 GRT) and Procida (1,843 GRT), escorted by the Italian torpedo boats Lupo and Cassiopea, sailing from Greece to Benghazi of on 24 November. The convoy was about 100 nmi (190 km; 120 mi) west of Crete when the merchant ships were sunk by the British cruisers HMS Aurora and Penelope and the destroyers HMS Lance and Lively, the torpedo boats making off once it was certain that the ships were doomed. The loss of the cargoes led the German command to report that the fuel situation of the Luftwaffe in North Africa was desperate.

=== Axis convoys ===
The Italian and German forces in North Africa, facing Operation Crusader, a British offensive against Tobruk, were in urgent need of fuel and ammunition. Supermarina (Naval Staff of the Regia Marina) at the request of Comando Supremo (supreme command of the Italian armed forces), made an emergency plan to shift supplies using warships. The light cruisers Alberico da Barbiano and Alberto di Giussano of the 4th Cruiser Division (ammiraglio di divisione [divisional admiral] Antonino Toscano) were fast and too lightly armoured for employment with the battle fleet and were selected for this operation.

=== Da Barbiano and Di Giussano ===
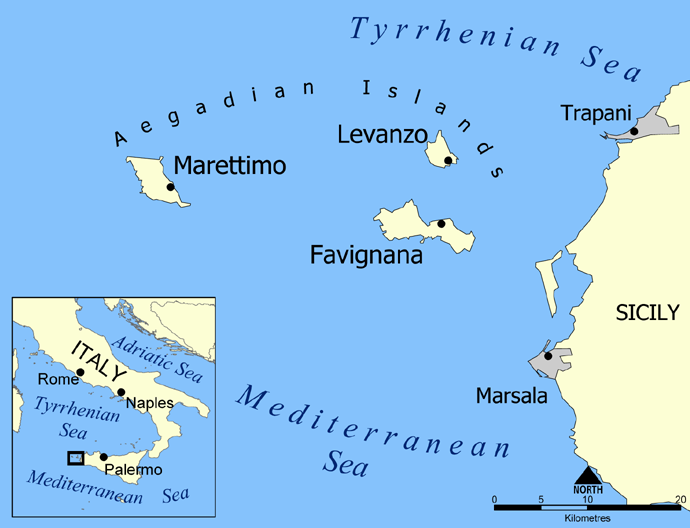
Marettimo in the Aegadian Islands, off western Sicily

Da Barbiano (flagship) and Di Giussano left Taranto at 8:15 on 5 December 1941, reached Brindisi at 17:50, took on about 49 long tons (50 t) of supplies, then proceeded to Palermo on 8 December, where they loaded another 22 long tons (22 t) of aviation fuel to alleviate a shortage in Libya and without which, aircraft would be unable to escort supply convoys. The fuel, contained in unsealed barrels, was placed on the stern deck, creating a grave risk of fire from British gunfire and from the discharge of the ships' guns, preventing the use of the stern turrets unless the fuel was jettisoned.

The two cruisers sailed from Palermo at 17:20 on 9 December, heading for Tripoli. At 22:56, when north of Pantelleria, they were spotted by a British reconnaissance aircraft, which had been directed to the area by Ultra intercepts and shadowed them. At 23:55, Toscano (who was in the middle of the Sicilian Channel) decided to turn back to base as surprise had been lost, much British radio traffic foreshadowed air attack and worsening sea conditions would delay the ships, further exposing them to British attacks. Da Barbiano and Di Giussano reached Palermo at 8:20 on 10 December, after overcoming a British air attack off Marettimo. Toscano was much criticised by Supermarina for his decision to abort the mission.

== Prelude ==
=== Italian preparations ===
Convoy M. 41, was planned for 13 December but air cover by aircraft based in Libya would be impossible unless they received the fuel from Italy. On 12 December it was decided that the 4th Division would attempt again the trip to Tripoli. The cruiser Bande Nere was to join Da Barbiano and Di Giussano to carry more supplies but she was prevented from sailing by a breakdown and the cargo was transferred to the other two cruisers. Da Barbiano and Di Giussano were loaded with 98 long tons (100 t) of aviation fuel, 250 long tons (250 t) of petrol, 590 long tons (600 t) of naphtha, 890 long tons (900 t) of food and 135 ratings on passage to Tripoli. The stern of Da Barbiano (and to a lesser extent, Di Giussano) was packed with fuel barrels so thickly, that it was not possible to traverse the guns.

Toscano held a briefing with his staff and officers from both ships, where it was decided that, in case of encounter with enemy ships, the barrels would be thrown overboard to enable the ships to open fire. Da Barbiano, Di Giussano and their only escort, the torpedo boat Cigno (a second torpedo boat, Climene, was left in the port due to a breakdown) sailed from Palermo at 18:10 on 12 December. The 4th Division was ordered to pass north-west of the Aegadian Islands and then head for Cape Bon and follow the Tunisian coast; the ships would keep a speed of 22–23 kn (41–43 km/h; 25–26 mph) to conserve fuel and deliver it at Tripoli. Air cover, air reconnaissance and defensive MAS (Motoscafo armato silurante [torpedo-armed motorboat]) ambushes were planned to safeguard the convoy.

=== British plans ===
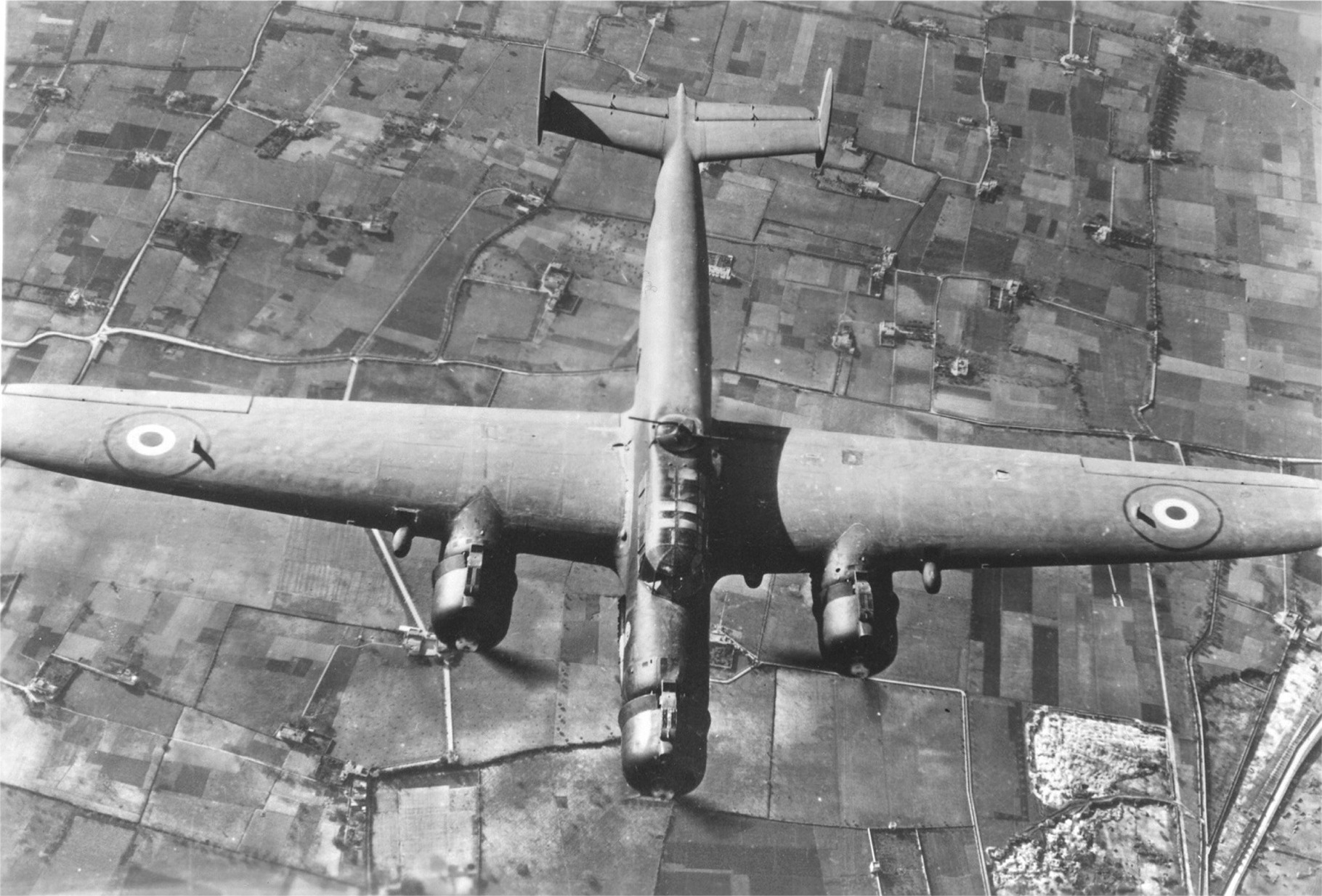
Example of a CANT Z.1007

Four destroyers of the 4th Destroyer Flotilla consisting of the destroyers HMS Sikh (Commander G. H. Stokes), Maori, Legion and the Dutch Isaac Sweers, had departed Gibraltar on 11 December to join the Mediterranean Fleet at Alexandria. By 8 December, the British had de-coded Italian C-38 m wireless signals about the Italian supply operation and its course for Tripoli. The RAF sent a Wellington bomber on a reconnaissance sortie to disguise the British source and on 12 December the 4th Destroyer Flotilla, heading eastwards towards the Italian ships, was ordered to increase speed to 30 kn (56 km/h; 35 mph) and intercept the Italian ships.

In the afternoon of 12 December, a CANT Z.1007 bis of the Regia Aeronautica spotted the four destroyers heading east at an estimated speed of 20 kn (37 km/h; 23 mph), 60 mi (97 km) off Algiers. Supermarina was immediately informed but calculated that, even in the case the destroyers would increase their speed to 28 kn (52 km/h; 32 mph), they would not reach Cape Bon until around 03:00 on 13 December, about one hour after the 4th Division. Toscano (who learned of the sighting while he was still in harbour) was not ordered to increase speed or alter course to avoid them.

Following new Ultra decodes a new reconnaissance aircraft spotted Toscano's ships at sunset on 12 December, after which the 4th Destroyer Flotilla was directed to intercept the two cruisers, increasing speed to 30 kn (56 km/h; 35 mph). This speed, along with a one-hour delay that the 4th Division had accrued (and that Toscano omitted to report to Supermarina), frustrated Supermarina calculations about the advantage that the 4th Division would have. At 22:23 Toscano was informed that he would possibly meet "enemy steamers coming from Malta" and at 23:15 he ordered action stations.

== Battle ==
=== 12/13 December, night ===
The 4th Destroyer Flotilla sighted the Italian cruisers near Cap Bon, at 02:30 on 13 December. At 2:45, 7 nmi (13 km; 8.1 mi) off Cape Bon, the noise of an aircraft could be heard on the Italian ships (a radar-equipped Wellington bomber) that detected the ships and informed Stokes. At 3:15 the ships altered course to 157° to pass about a 1 nmi (1.9 km; 1.2 mi) off Cape Bon. Five minutes later, Toscano suddenly ordered full speed ahead and a course change to 337°, turning about; this sudden change disrupted the Italian formation, as neither Cigno, about 2 nmi (3.7 km; 2.3 mi) ahead of the cruisers, nor Di Giussano, following Da Barbiano in line, received the order and while Di Giussano saw the flagship reverse course and imitated her (but remained misaligned) Cigno did not noticed the change until 3:25, when she also reversed course but lagged far behind the cruisers.

=== 13 December, morning ===
Map showing Cape Bon (right edge)

The Allied destroyers were just off Cape Bon and had the Italian ships in sight. Arriving from astern, under the cover of darkness and using radar, the British ships sailed close inshore and surprised the Italians, who were further out to sea, by launching torpedoes from short range. The course reversal accelerated the approach between the two groups and the Allied destroyers attacked together; Sikh fired her guns and four torpedoes against Da Barbiano [less than 1,000 m (3,300 ft) distant] and Legion did the same.

Isaac Sweers opened fire against Di Giussano and Maori fired torpedoes at Di Giussano. Toscano ordered full speed, open fire and ordered Di Giussano to increase speed to 30 kn (56 km/h; 35 mph). Da Barbiano also started a turn to port (ordered by Captain, Giorgio Rodocanacchi) but at 3:22, before her guns were able to fire, only some machine-guns getting into action, the cruiser was hit by a torpedo below the foremost turret, that caused her to list to port. Da Barbiano was then raked with machine-gun fire, which killed or wounded many men and set fire to the fuel barrels, then the ship was hit by a second torpedo in the engine room.

At 3:26 Maori fired torpedoes at Da Barbiano and opened fire with her guns, hitting the bridge. The cruiser was hit soon after by another torpedo in the stern (possibly from Legion) Di Giussano was also hit by a torpedo and gunfire, being left disabled. The land behind the Allied destroyers made it impossible for the Italians to see them and Di Giussano managed to fire only three salvoes. In five minutes both cruisers were disabled; Da Barbiano rapidly listed to port, while fires quickly spread over the ship and into the sea by the floating fuel. The crew abandoned ship, at 3:35, Da Barbiano capsized and sank in a sea of flame, with Toscano, Rodocanacchi and another 532 men still aboard. Di Giussano was left dead in the water with fires raging; the crew struggled to keep the ship afloat but she also had to be abandoned, breaking in two and sinking at 4:20, with the loss of 283 men.

== Aftermath ==
=== Analysis ===
Toscano's decision to reverse course has never been fully explained. He might have decided to turn back after realising that he had been spotted by aircraft, as he did on 9 December. A course towards the Aegadian Islands would have made more sense, instead of the north-westerly course Toscano ordered. The course change was ordered more than 30 minutes after the cruisers had been spotted; Toscano may have wanted to mislead the reconnaissance aircraft about his real course, wait for it to leave and then turn again for Tripoli. He might have thought, from the aircraft noise, that torpedo bombers were coming and he wanted to get into waters farther away from the shore and from Italian minefields for freedom of manoeuvre. Toscano ordered his gunners to stand by; he may have known that Allied destroyers were astern of his ships and he wanted to avoid presenting his stern to them because his aft turrets were obstructed by the fuel barrels.

=== Casualties ===
After a brief encounter with Isaac Sweers, Cigno rescued nearly 500 survivors; others reached the coast and another 145 men were later saved by Italian MAS boats, Motoscafo armato silurante, motor torpedo boats to the British. Andrea Ghisotti in 2010 and Aldo Coccia in 1962 wrote that 817 men were killed in the action.

== Orders of battle ==
=== Regia Marina ===
4th Cruiser Division
Name	Flag	Type	Notes
Alberico da Barbiano	Kingdom of Italy	Giussano-class cruiser	
Alberto di Giussano	Kingdom of Italy	Giussano-class cruiser	
Cigno	Kingdom of Italy	Spica-class torpedo boat	

=== Royal Navy ===
4th Destroyer Flotilla
Name	Flag	Type	Notes
HMS Maori	Royal Navy	Tribal-class destroyer	
HMS Sikh	Royal Navy	Tribal-class destroyer	Flag, Commander Graham Stokes
HMS Legion	Royal Navy	L-class destroyer	
HNLMS Isaac Sweers	Royal Netherlands Navy	Gerard Callenburgh-class destroyer	
