= Salomon Sweers =

Counsel for the Dutch East India Company (1611–1674)

Salomon Sweers (15 June 1612 [some literature says 1611] in Nijmegen – 2 March 1674 in Amsterdam) was a bookkeeper and a counsel for the Dutch East India Company. He was buried 6 March in Oude Kerk, where his grave is still at site 388 in Snijderskapel. His younger brother was Admiral Isaac Sweers employed by the Admiralty of Amsterdam.

== Early life ==
Salomon Sweers was the son of Aernout Sweerts, a member of the vroedschap, and Alida van Bronckhorst. In 1628 the family moved to Amsterdam, when his father became a representative in the East India Company.

== East India period ==
Seventeen-year-old Salomon joined the East India Company or Vereenigde Oostindische Compagnie as a clerk. In 1632 Sweers left for the East, under the command of Antonie van Diemen, who protected him.

In 1638 in Batavia he married Catharina Jans, a widow from Hoorn. Together they paid a visit to their homeland. In 1640 he undertook a second journey to Batavia, being appointed to the Council of the Indies.

Together with Antonie van Diemen, Cornelis Witsen, Cornelis van der Lijn and Joan Maetsuycker, Sweers was involved in the two expeditions of Abel Tasman. Tasman named several islands after members of the Council, as here can be seen. In 1646 he left Batavia again, after being accused of "private trade", having in secret shipped valuables to the Dutch Republic. He was fired. Frederick Coyett took charge of his goods.

== Later life ==
In 1649 Sweers bought a house near that of Johannes van Rensselaer, Patroon of the Manor of Rensselaerswyck in the New Netherlands. In 1653 he became involved in the upbringing of Jacques Specx's children.

Sweers gradually restored his fortune. On 10 November 1661 his wife died. In 1662 he remarried Elisabet Bicker, a daughter of Andries Bicker and sister of Wendela Bicker, the wife of grand pensionary Johan de Witt. In 1666 Elisabet died. In 1667 he remarried Josina Bataille, a widow in Rotterdam.

== Legacy ==
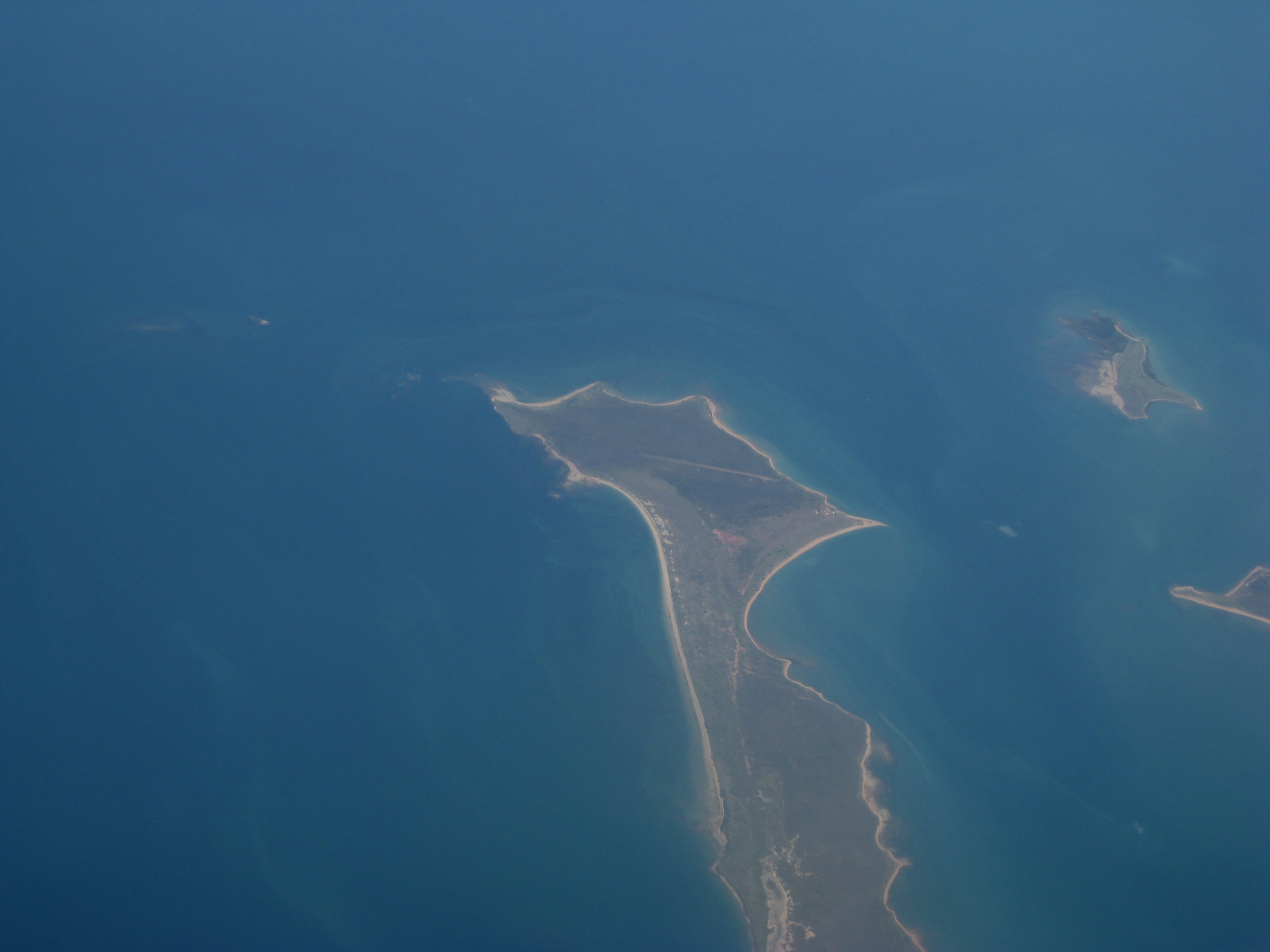
Aerial view of southern part of Sweers Island, 2009

Sweers Island in the Gulf of Carpentaria (17.1022°S 139.6188°E) was named by Matthew Flinders in 1802, a name it still carries. Flinders gave it this name as an honour to the Dutch who had been there before him, and hence this eight by two kilometre island is indeed named after Salomon Sweers.

The Sweers Islands in van Van Diemen's Land (Tasmania) were named by Abel Tasman in November 1642, but the exact location of these islands remains unknown. Tasman also named 'Salomon Suwers (Sweers) hoeck' or Salomon Sweers Cape on the northern coast of Lavongai (New Hanover) in the Bismarck Archipelago, north-east of Papua New Guinea during the 1642 journey, and in 1644 Tasman named the Sweers River in the Gulf of Carpentaria, Queensland, Australia. This river's probable location is Investigator Road (in which case it was not a river), the strait between Bentinck and Sweers Island, two of the South Wellesley Islands. None of these names are in use today.

Salomon Sweers' correspondence etc. is at the National Archives in The Hague, named Collectie Sweers or the Sweers Collection. Containing some 2378 folios, it gives an interesting insight into the life of the VOC and Sweers’ later career. In this collection is also the 'Sailor's Journal', a copy of a journal written by a subordinate officer aboard Heemskerck during Abel Tasman's circumnavigation of Australia 1642-43.

The Sweers Collection once also included the so-called Huydecoper journal, another and larger copy of a journal of the same 1642-43 expedition. This journal has since 1927 been at the State Library of New South Wales, Australia. Analyses of handwritten text samples from Dutch archives reveal that marginal annotations in the Sweers Collection, and also in the Huydecoper journal, were most likely written by Salomon Sweers' son-in-law Jacobus de Fremery around the year 1700, and not by a Cornelis Sweers as first argued by P.A. Leupe in 1872 and later widely cited in literature.
