= German submarine U-133 (1941) =

German World War II submarine

Coordinates: 37°50′N 23°35′E

History

Nazi Germany
- Name: U-133
- Ordered: 7 August 1939
- Builder: Vegesacker Werft GmbH, Bremen-Vegesack
- Cost: 4,760,000 Reichsmark
- Yard number: 12
- Laid down: 21 August 1940
- Launched: 28 April 1941
- Commissioned: 5 July 1941
- Fate: Sunk, 14 March 1942

General characteristics
- Class & type: Type VIIC submarine
- Displacement: 769 tonnes (757 long tons) surfaced; 871 t (857 long tons) submerged
- Length: 67.10 m (220 ft 2 in) o/a; 50.50 m (165 ft 8 in) pressure hull
- Beam: 6.20 m (20 ft 4 in) o/a; 4.70 m (15 ft 5 in) pressure hull
- Height: 9.60 m (31 ft 6 in)
- Draught: 4.74 m (15 ft 7 in)
- Installed power: 2,800–3,200 PS (2,100–2,400 kW; 2,800–3,200 bhp) (diesels); 750 PS (550 kW; 740 shp) (electric)
- Propulsion: 2 shafts; 2 × diesel engines; 2 × electric motors
- Speed: 17.7 knots (32.8 km/h; 20.4 mph) surfaced; 7.6 knots (14.1 km/h; 8.7 mph) submerged
- Range: 8,500 nmi (15,700 km; 9,800 mi) at 10 knots (19 km/h; 12 mph) surfaced; 80 nmi (150 km; 92 mi) at 4 knots (7.4 km/h; 4.6 mph) submerged
- Test depth: 230 m (750 ft); Crush depth: 250–295 m (820–968 ft)
- Complement: 4 officers, 40–56 enlisted
- Armament: 5 × 53.3 cm (21 in) torpedo tubes (four bow, one stern); 14 × torpedoes or 26 TMA mines; 1 × 8.8 cm (3.46 in) deck gun (220 rounds); 1 x 2 cm (0.79 in) C/30 AA gun

Service record
- Part of: 7th U-boat Flotilla; 5 July – 31 December 1941; 23rd U-boat Flotilla; 1 January – 14 March 1942
- Identification codes: M 43 319
- Commanders: Kptlt. Hermann Hesse; 5 July 1941 – 1 March 1942; Kptlt. Eberhard Mohr; 2 – 14 March 1942
- Operations: 3 patrols: 1st patrol: 22 October – 26 November 1941; 2nd patrol: a. 16 – 26 December 1941; b. 28 – 29 December 1941; c. 1 – 22 January 1942; 3rd patrol: 14 March 1942
- Victories: 1 warship sunk (1,920 tons)

German submarine U-133 was a Type VIIC U-boat built for Nazi Germany's Kriegsmarine for service during World War II. She was laid down on 21 August 1940 by Vegesacker Werft, Bremen-Vegesack as yard number 12, launched on 28 April 1941 and commissioned on 5 July that year. U-133 sank with all hands lost after striking a mine off Aegina island Greece on 14 March 1942. In 1986 the professional divers Efstáthios "Státhis" Baramátis and Theófilos Klímis spotted by chance a wreck at a depth of 74 meters that was identified as an unknown German submarine. Almost ten years later, in the mid-90s, the same wreck was further identified by Greek divers as the U-133.

== Design ==
German Type VIIC submarines were preceded by the shorter Type VIIB submarines. U-133 had a displacement of 769 tonnes (757 long tons) when at the surface and 871 tonnes (857 long tons) while submerged. She had a total length of 67.10 m (220 ft 2 in), a pressure hull length of 50.50 m (165 ft 8 in), a beam of 6.20 m (20 ft 4 in), a height of 9.60 m (31 ft 6 in), and a draught of 4.74 m (15 ft 7 in). The submarine was powered by two MAN M6V 40/46 four-stroke, six-cylinder supercharged diesel engines producing a total of 2,800 to 3,200 metric horsepower (2,060 to 2,350 kW; 2,760 to 3,160 shp) for use while surfaced, two Brown, Boveri & Cie GG UB 720/8 double-acting electric motors producing a total of 750 metric horsepower (550 kW; 740 shp) for use while submerged. She had two shafts and two 1.23 m (4 ft) propellers. The boat was capable of operating at depths of up to 230 metres (750 ft).

The submarine had a maximum surface speed of 17.7 knots (32.8 km/h; 20.4 mph) and a maximum submerged speed of 7.6 knots (14.1 km/h; 8.7 mph). When submerged, the boat could operate for 80 nautical miles (150 km; 92 mi) at 4 knots (7.4 km/h; 4.6 mph); when surfaced, she could travel 8,500 nautical miles (15,700 km; 9,800 mi) at 10 knots (19 km/h; 12 mph). U-113 was fitted with five 53.3 cm (21 in) torpedo tubes (four fitted at the bow and one at the stern), fourteen torpedoes, one 8.8 cm (3.46 in) SK C/35 naval gun, 220 rounds, and a 2 cm (0.79 in) C/30 anti-aircraft gun. The boat had a complement of between forty-four and sixty.

== Summary of raiding history ==
Date	Name	Nationality	Tonnage (Note: Merchant ship tonnages are in gross register tons. Military vessels are listed by tons displacement.)	Fate
17 January 1942	HMS Gurkha	Royal Navy	1,920	Sunk

== Bibliography ==
- Busch, Rainer; Röll, Hans-Joachim (1999). German U-boat commanders of World War II : a biographical dictionary. Translated by Brooks, Geoffrey. London, Annapolis, Md: Greenhill Books, Naval Institute Press. ISBN 1-55750-186-6.
- Busch, Rainer; Röll, Hans-Joachim (1999). Deutsche U-Boot-Verluste von September 1939 bis Mai 1945 [German U-boat losses from September 1939 to May 1945]. Der U-Boot-Krieg (in German). Vol. IV. Hamburg, Berlin, Bonn: Mittler. ISBN 3-8132-0514-2.
- Gröner, Erich; Jung, Dieter; Maass, Martin (1991). U-boats and Mine Warfare Vessels. German Warships 1815–1945. Vol. 2. Translated by Thomas, Keith; Magowan, Rachel. London: Conway Maritime Press. ISBN 0-85177-593-4.
- Galon, Dimitri (2021). "The U-133 / The Life and Death of a Historic German Submarine". QUEST Magazine. Vol. 21, no. 4. High Springs, Florida: Global Underwater Explorers.
