= HNLMS Isaac Sweers (1940) =

Dutch naval destroyer (1941–42)

Isaac Sweers
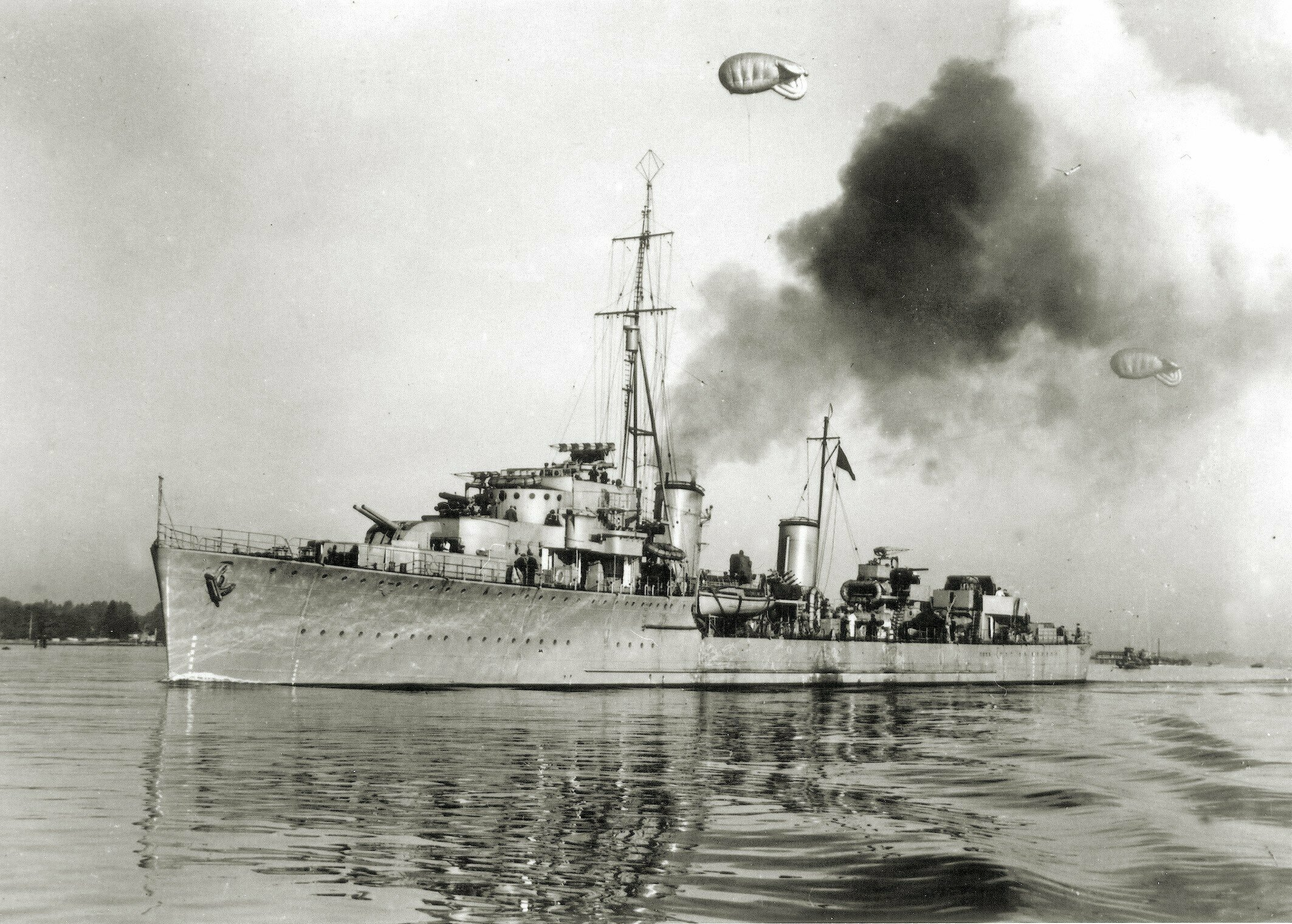

History

Netherlands
- Name: Isaac Sweers
- Namesake: Admiral Isaac Sweers
- Builder: Koninklijke Maatschappij De Schelde; John I. Thornycroft & Company
- Laid down: 26 November 1938
- Launched: 16 March 1940
- Commissioned: 29 May 1941
- Fate: Torpedoed and sunk on 13 November 1942

General characteristics
- Class & type: Gerard Callenburgh-class destroyer
- Displacement: 1,604 tons standard; 2,228 tons full load
- Length: 107 m (351 ft 1 in)
- Beam: 10.6 m (34 ft 9 in)
- Draught: 2.8 m (9 ft 2 in)
- Propulsion: 2 shaft, Parsons geared turbines; 3 Yarrow type boilers; 45,000 hp (34,000 kW)
- Speed: 37.5 knots (69.5 km/h; 43.2 mph)
- Range: 3,200 nmi (5,900 km; 3,700 mi) at 15 knots (28 km/h; 17 mph)
- Armament: 6 × QF 4-inch Mk XVI naval guns; 4 × 40 mm Bofors; 8 × Vickers .50 machine guns; 8 × British 21-inch torpedoes; Mines & Depth Charges

HNLMS Isaac Sweers was one of four Gerard Callenburgh-class destroyer built for the Royal Netherlands Navy during World War II.

== Design and construction ==
The keel was laid on 26 November 1938. The ship was launched on 16 March 1940 and the unfinished ship was evacuated to England after the German invasion of the Netherlands. She was completed in Great Britain, with six British 4-inch dual purpose guns instead of planned five 120 mm guns. The ship was modern for her time, she was fast and had two manually stabilized 40 mm Bofors AA guns, each with its own Hazemeyer fire control, an on-mount mechanical analog fire control computer integrated with a on-mount optical rangefinder. It was the first Dutch ship to use a Dutch radio direction finder (RDF 289), to aim its AA guns. The ship's plans were saved from the Germans and elements were incorporated into Royal Navy ship designs.

== Operations ==
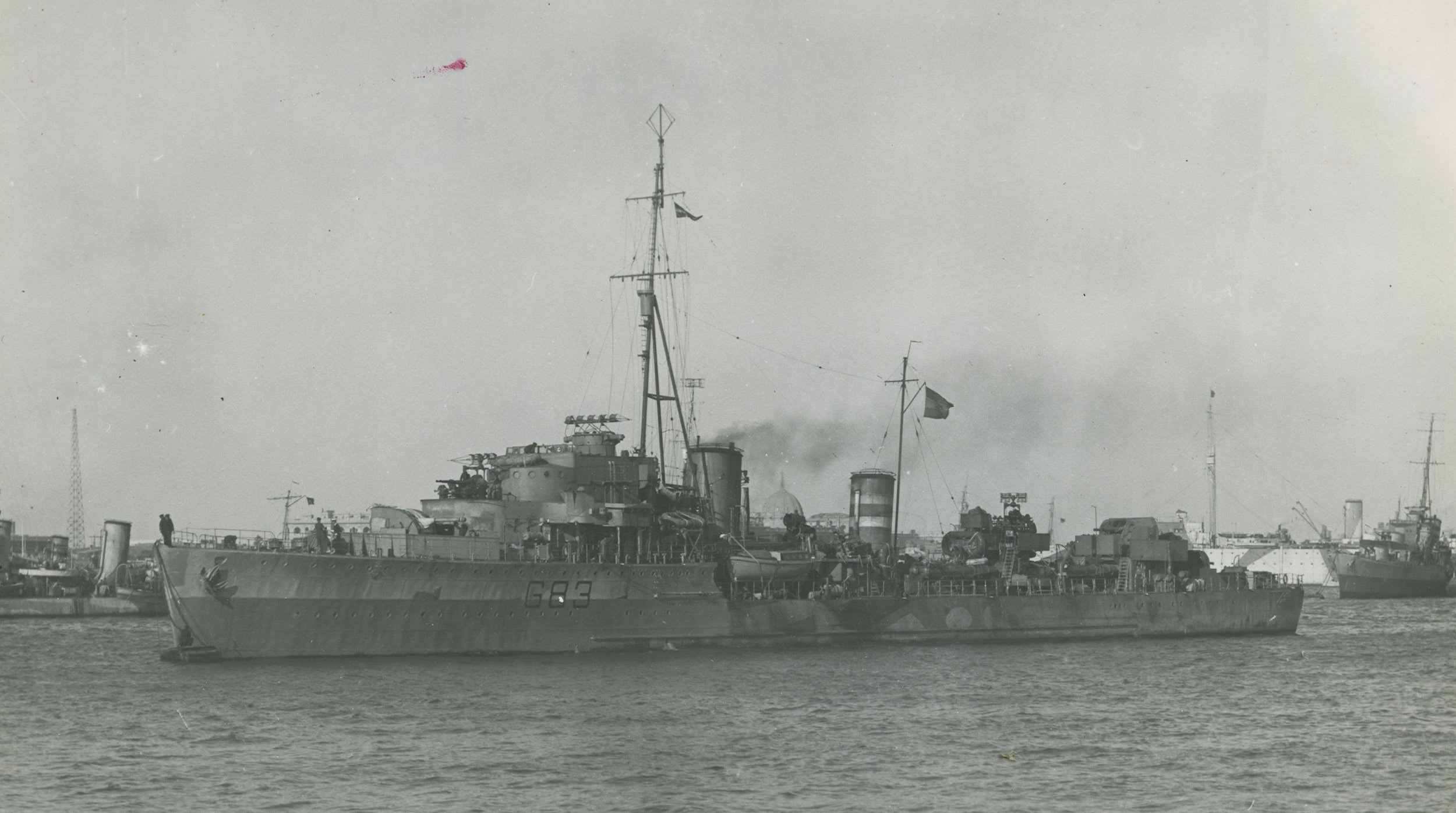
A camouflaged Isaac Sweers sometime in 1941−1942.

Isaac Sweers was part of the Allied 4th Destroyer Flotilla which torpedoed and sank the Italian cruisers Alberico da Barbiano and Alberto di Giussano on 13 December 1941, at the Battle of Cape Bon. She riddled Alberto di Giussano with gunfire at short range and launched four torpedoes against the Cigno; all of them missed their target. She escorted the important convoy MW 8B to Malta in January 1942. During this mission the British destroyer Gurkha was torpedoed by the German submarine U-133 on 12 January 1942. Isaac Sweers towed the stricken British destroyer through a field of burning oil and saved her entire crew of 240 sailors. They were taken to Tobruk.

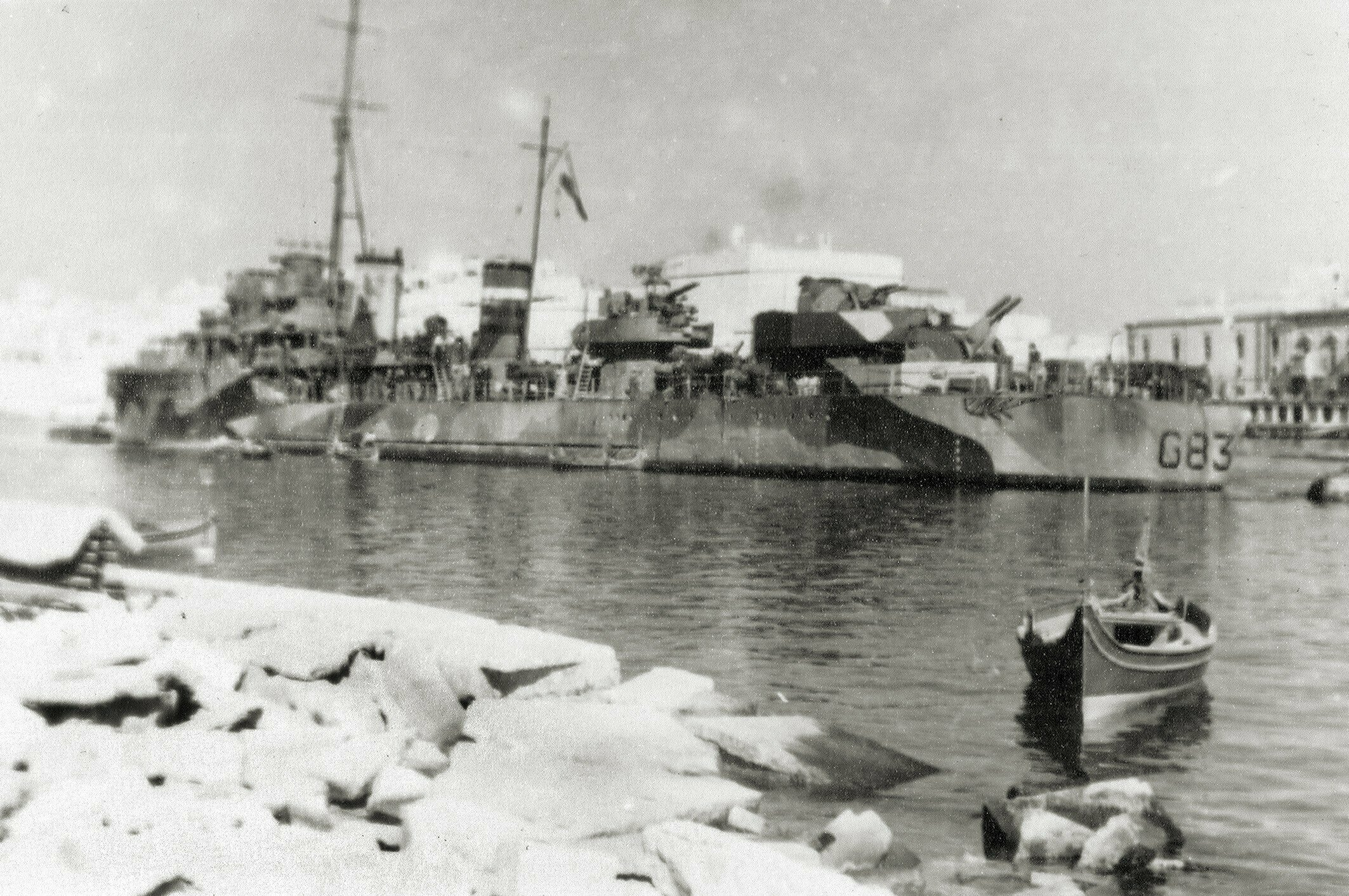
Isaac Sweers in Malta

During Operation Torch, on 11 November 1942, along with HMS Porcupine, Isaac Sweers helped rescue 241 men from the ship Nieuw Zeeland, a Dutch troop transport that had been torpedoed by the German submarine U-380 at 35°57′N 03°58′W - about 80 miles (130 km) east of Gibraltar, in the Mediterranean. On 13 November 1942, Isaac Sweers was hit by two torpedoes from the German submarine U-431. She sank with the loss of 108 of her 194 crew.
