= HMS Maori (F24) =

Royal Navy Tribal class destroyer sunk in Malta

Coordinates: 35°54′17″N 14°31′08″E

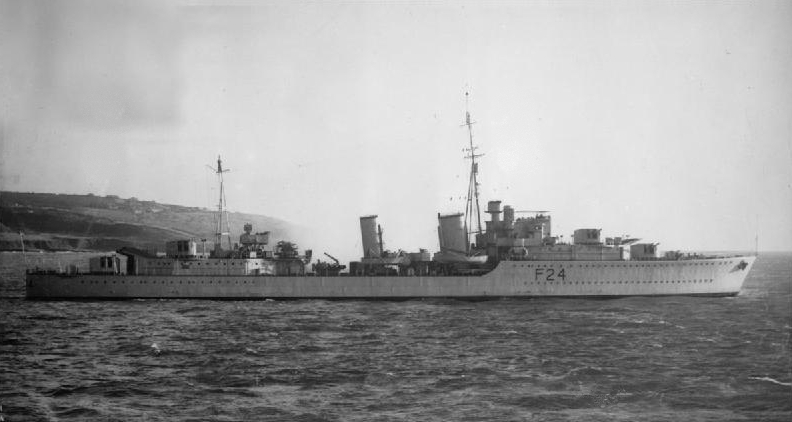
- Maori underway

History

United Kingdom
- Name: Maori
- Namesake: Māori people
- Ordered: 10 March 1936
- Builder: Fairfield Shipbuilding and Engineering Company, Govan
- Cost: £340,622
- Laid down: 6 July 1936
- Launched: 2 September 1937
- Completed: 30 November 1938
- Commissioned: 5 December 1938
- Identification: Pennant numbers: L24/F24/G24
- Fate: Sunk by aircraft, 12 February 1942

General characteristics (as built)
- Class & type: Tribal-class destroyer
- Displacement: 1,891 long tons (1,921 t) (standard); 2,519 long tons (2,559 t) (deep load)
- Length: 377 ft (114.9 m) (o/a)
- Beam: 36 ft 6 in (11.13 m)
- Draught: 11 ft 3 in (3.43 m)
- Installed power: 3 × Admiralty 3-drum boilers; 44,000 shp (33,000 kW)
- Propulsion: 2 × shafts; 2 × geared steam turbines
- Speed: 36 knots (67 km/h; 41 mph)
- Range: 5,700 nmi (10,600 km; 6,600 mi) at 15 knots (28 km/h; 17 mph)
- Complement: 190
- Sensors & processing systems: ASDIC
- Armament: 4 × twin 4.7 in (120 mm) guns; 1 × quadruple 2-pdr (40 mm (1.6 in)) AA guns; 2 × quadruple 0.5 in (12.7 mm) anti-aircraft machineguns; 1 × quadruple 21 in (533 mm) torpedo tubes; 20 × depth charges, 1 × rack, 2 × throwers

HMS Maori was a Tribal-class destroyer named after the indigenous Māori people of New Zealand. She served with the United Kingdom Mediterranean Fleet during World War II until she was bombed and sunk by German aircraft while at Malta in 1942. Her wreck was later raised and scuttled outside the Grand Harbour. The wreck is now a dive site.

== Description ==
The Tribals were intended to counter the large destroyers being built abroad and to improve the firepower of the existing destroyer flotillas and were thus significantly larger and more heavily armed than the preceding I class. The ships displaced 1,891 long tons (1,921 t) at standard load and 2,519 long tons (2,559 t) at deep load. They had an overall length of 377 feet (114.9 m), a beam of 36 feet 6 inches (11.13 m) and a draught of 11 feet 3 inches (3.43 m). The destroyers were powered by two Parsons geared steam turbines, each driving one propeller shaft using steam provided by three Admiralty three-drum boilers. The turbines developed a total of 44,000 shaft horsepower (33,000 kW) and gave a maximum speed of 36 knots (67 km/h; 41 mph). During her sea trials Maori made 36.0 knots (66.7 km/h; 41.4 mph) from 46,006 shp (34,307 kW) at a displacement of 2,006 long tons (2,038 t). The ships carried enough fuel oil to give them a range of 5,700 nautical miles (10,600 km; 6,600 mi) at 15 knots (28 km/h; 17 mph). The ships' complement consisted of 190 officers and ratings, although the flotilla leaders carried an extra 20 officers and men consisting of the Captain (D) and his staff.

The primary armament of the Tribal-class destroyers was eight quick-firing (QF) 4.7-inch (120 mm) Mark XII guns in four superfiring twin-gun mounts, one pair each fore and aft of the superstructure, designated 'A', 'B', 'X', and 'Y' from front to rear. The mounts had a maximum elevation of 40°. For anti-aircraft (AA) defence, they carried a single quadruple mount for the 40-millimetre (1.6 in) QF two-pounder Mk II "pom-pom" gun and two quadruple mounts for the 0.5-inch (12.7 mm) Mark III machine gun. Low-angle fire for the main guns was controlled by the director-control tower (DCT) on the bridge roof that fed data acquired by it and the 12-foot (3.7 m) rangefinder on the Mk II Rangefinder/Director directly aft of the DCT to an analogue mechanical computer, the Mk I Admiralty Fire Control Clock. Anti-aircraft fire for the main guns was controlled by the Rangefinder/Director which sent data to the mechanical Fuze Keeping Clock.

The ships were fitted with a single above-water quadruple mount for 21-inch (533 mm) torpedoes. The Tribals were not intended as anti-submarine ships, but they were provided with ASDIC, one depth charge rack and two throwers for self-defence, although the throwers were not mounted in all ships; Twenty depth charges was the peacetime allotment, but this increased to 30 during wartime.

=== Wartime modifications ===
Heavy losses to German air attack during the Norwegian Campaign demonstrated the ineffectiveness of the Tribals' anti-aircraft suite and the RN decided in May 1940 to replace 'X' mount with two QF 4-inch (102 mm) Mark XVI dual-purpose guns in a twin-gun mount. To better control the guns, the existing rangefinder/director was modified to accept a Type 285 gunnery radar as they became available. The number of depth charges was increased to 46 early in the war, and still more were added later. To increase the firing arcs of the AA guns, the rear funnel was shortened and the mainmast was reduced to a short pole mast.

== Construction and career ==
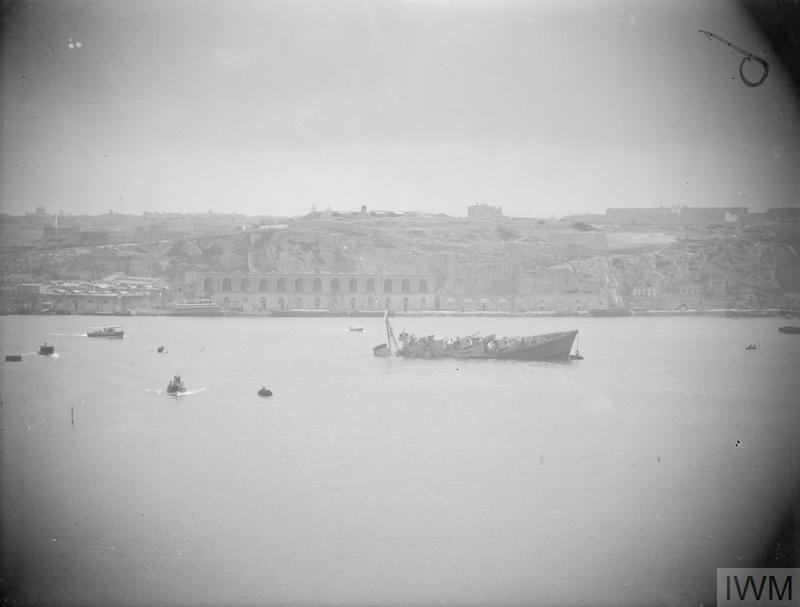
HMS Maori sinking in Grand Harbor, February 12, 1942

Authorized as one of seven Tribal-class destroyers under the 1935 Naval Estimates, Maori was the second ship of her name to serve in the Royal Navy. The ship was ordered on 10 March 1936 from Fairfield Shipbuilding and Engineering Company and was laid down on 6 July at the company's Govan shipyard. She was launched on 2 September 1937 by Mrs. W. J. Jordan, the wife of the New Zealand High Commissioner Bill Jordan. Maori was completed on 30 November 1938 and commissioned on 5 December at a cost of £340,622 which excluded weapons and communication equipment furnished by the Admiralty.

Maori joined HMS Cossack's division in January 1939 and joined the Mediterranean Fleet. She and the other Tribal-class destroyers did convoy escort duties, and Maori then returned to Britain in October. Until April 1940 she patrolled the North Sea and also took part in the Norwegian Campaign. In June she sailed to Iceland looking for German warships and also served briefly in the Faroe Islands.

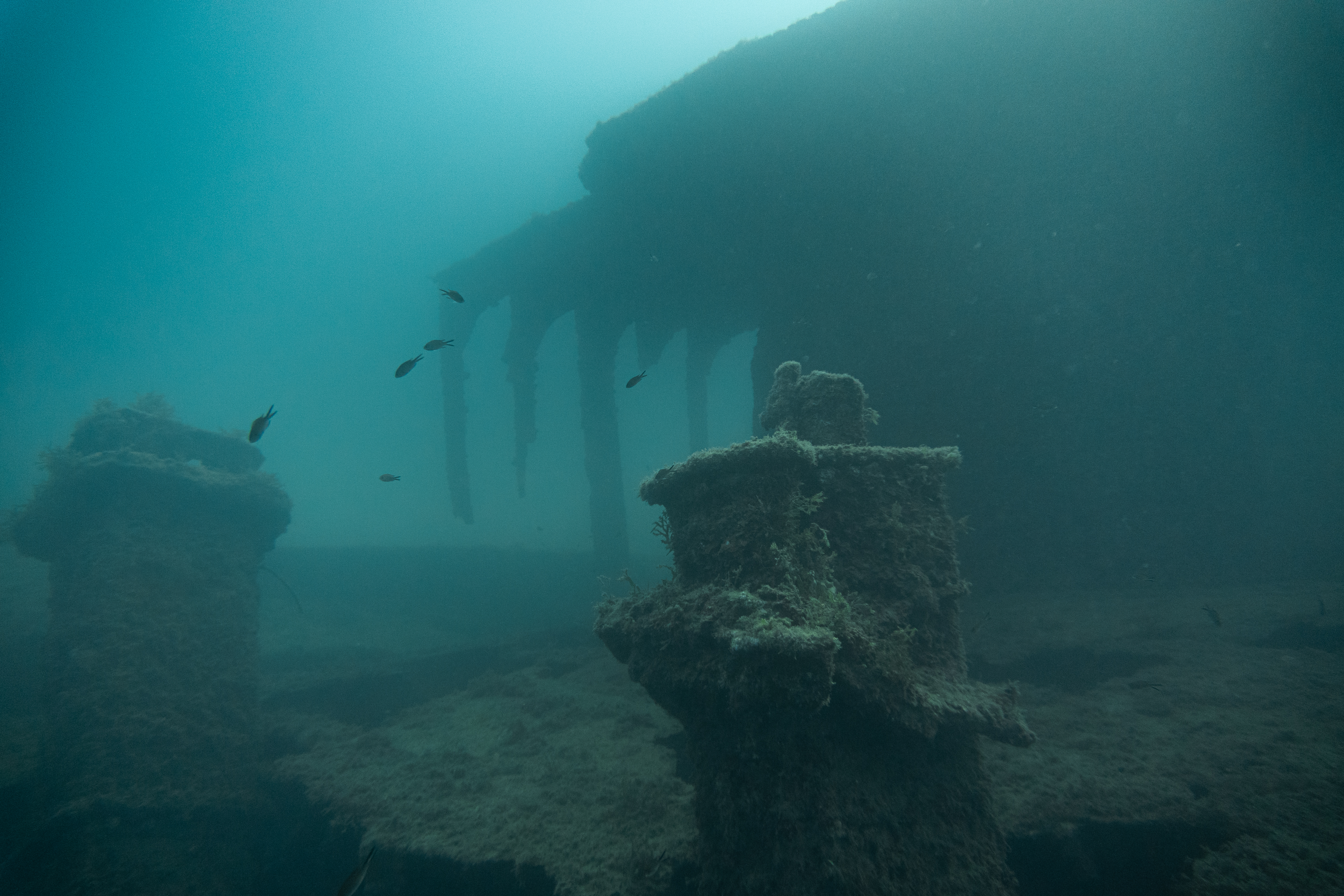
Underwater view of a section of the wrecked HMS Maori as it sits in a bay a few hundred metres off the shore in Valletta, Malta

In May 1941, she participated in the pursuit and destruction of the German battleship Bismarck. While escorting Convoy WS-8B to the Middle East, Maori, along with the destroyers Cossack, Sikh and Zulu broke off on 26 May and headed towards the area where Bismarck had been reported. They found her that evening and made several torpedo attacks in the evening and into the next morning. No hits were scored but they kept her gunners from getting any sleep, making it easier for the battleships to attack her the next morning. Maori then rescued some of the survivors from Bismarck after the battleship sank.

She served with the 14th Destroyer Flotilla during the Battle of Cape Bon in December 1941. Maori, commanded by Commander R. E. Courage, RN, was attacked by German aircraft and sunk at her moorings in the Malta Grand Harbour on 12 February 1942, with the loss of one of her crew; she was raised and scuttled off Fort Saint Elmo on 15 July 1945.

== Wreck ==
Located a few hundred metres from the shore from Valletta, HMS Maori is now a popular dive site. The bow section lies in white sand at a depth of 14 m (46 ft), the aft section of the ship having been abandoned in deep water during the tow from Grand Harbour to Marsamxett Harbour. Much of the forward superstructure is extant, including the two front gun bases. Much marine life can be found on the wreck.
