= Italian cruiser Alberto di Giussano =

Italian naval cruiser (1931–1941)

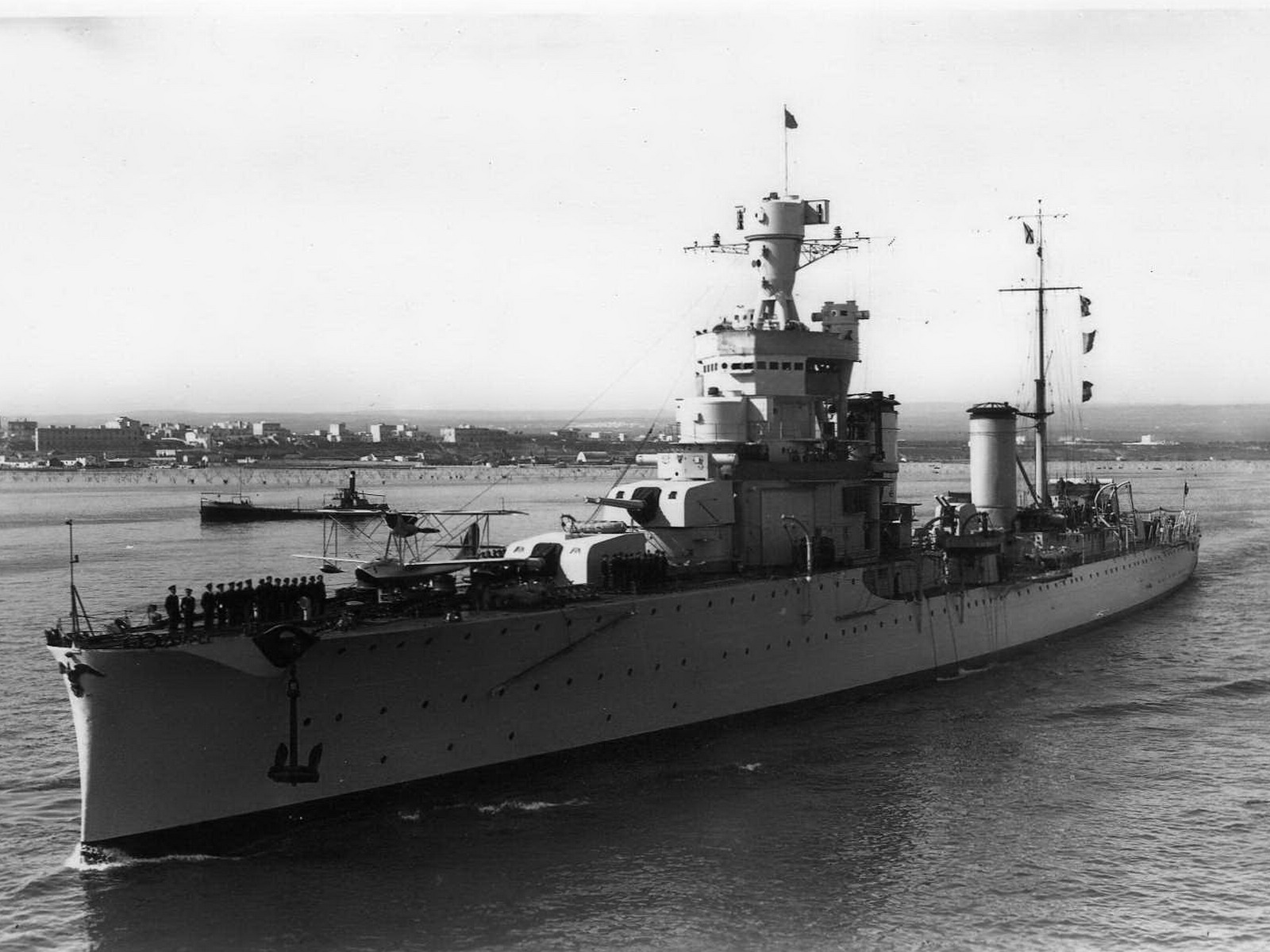

History

Italy
- Name: Alberto di Giussano
- Namesake: Alberto da Giussano
- Laid down: 29 March 1928
- Launched: 27 April 1930
- Commissioned: 1 January 1931
- Fate: Sunk at the Battle of Cape Bon, 13 December 1941

General characteristics
- Class & type: Giussano-class cruiser
- Displacement: 6,571 tonnes (6,467 long tons) (standard); 6,954 tonnes (6,844 long tons) (full load)
- Length: 169.3 m (555 ft 5 in)
- Beam: 15.5 m (50 ft 10 in)
- Draft: 5.3 m (17 ft 5 in)
- Propulsion: 6 Yarrow-Ansaldo boilers; 2 Belluzo turbines; 2 shafts; 95,000 hp
- Speed: 37 knots (69 km/h; 43 mph)
- Range: 3,800 nmi (7,000 km) at 18 kn (33 km/h; 21 mph)
- Complement: 507
- Armament: 8 × 152 mm (6 in) /53 guns in 4 twin mountings; 6 × 100 mm (4 in) / 47 caliber guns in 3 twin mountings; 8 × 37 mm (1.5 in) 54-cal. guns; 8 × 13.2 mm machine-guns; 4 × 533 mm (21 in) torpedo tubes
- Armor: Decks: 20 mm (0.79 in); Belt: 24 mm (0.94 in); Turrets: 23 mm (0.91 in); Tower: 40 mm (1.6 in)
- Aircraft carried: 2 × CANT 25AR (later Ro.43) seaplanes
- Aviation facilities: 1 × catapult launcher

Alberto di Giussano (named after Alberto da Giussano, a fictional medieval military leader condottiero) was an Italian Giussano-class cruiser, which served in the Regia Marina during World War II. She was launched on 27 April 1930.

She participated in the normal peacetime activities of the fleet in the 1930s as a unit of the 2nd Squadron, including service in connection with the Spanish Civil War. On 10 June 1940 she was part of the 4th Cruiser Division, with the 1st Squadron, together with her sister ship Alberico da Barbiano and was present at the Battle of Punta Stilo in July. She carried out a minelaying sortie off Pantelleria in August, and for the rest of the year acted as distant cover on occasions for troop and supply convoys to North Africa.

On 12 December 1941 she left port together with her sister ship Alberico da Barbiano. Both she and her sister were being used for an emergency convoy to carry gasoline for the German and Italian mobile formations fighting with the Afrika Korps. Jerrycans and other metal containers filled with gasoline were loaded onto both cruisers and were placed on the ships' open decks. The thinking behind using these two cruisers for such a dangerous mission was that their speed would act as a protection. Nonetheless, the ships were intercepted by four Allied destroyers guided by radar on 13 December 1941, in the Battle of Cape Bon. Alberto di Giussano was able to fire only three salvos before being struck by a torpedo amidships and hit by gunfire, which left her disabled and dead in the water. After vain struggle to halt the fire, the crew had to abandon the ship, which broke in two and sank at 4.22. 283 men out of the 720 aboard lost their lives. The ship's commanding officer, Captain Giovanni Marabotto, was among the survivors.

Wreck

The wreck of the cruiser was found thanks to the "Altair" expedition, sponsored by Cressi, in 2007. It lies approximately one mile off the coast of Cape Bon, at a depth of between 60 and 70 metres.
