= HMS Mohawk (F31) =

British Tribal-class destroyer

Coordinates: 34°56′0″N 11°42′0″E

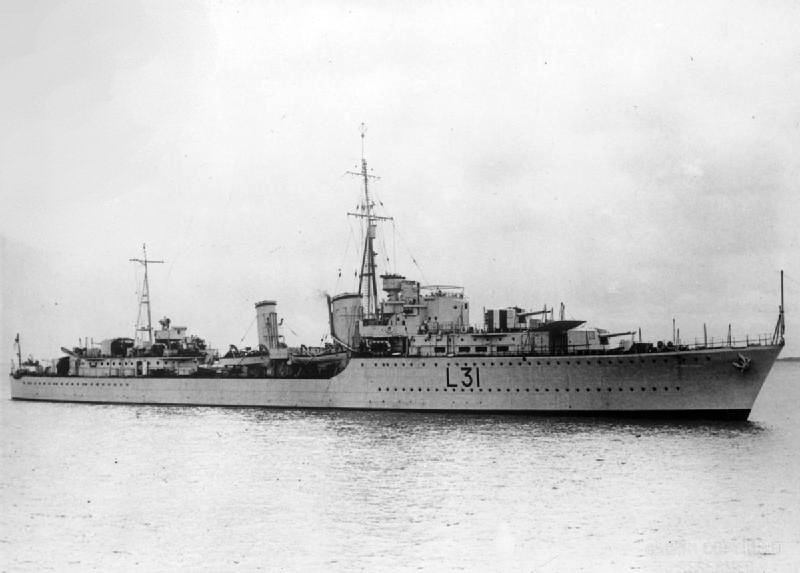
- Mohawk

History

United Kingdom
- Name: Mohawk
- Namesake: Mohawk people
- Ordered: 10 March 1936
- Builder: Thornycroft, Woolston, Southampton
- Cost: £339,585
- Laid down: 16 July 1936
- Launched: 5 October 1937
- Completed: 7 September 1938
- Commissioned: 9 September 1938
- Identification: Pennant numbers: L31/F31/G31
- Fate: Sunk by Italian destroyer Luca Tarigo, 16 April 1941

General characteristics (as built)
- Class & type: Tribal-class destroyer
- Displacement: 1,891 long tons (1,921 t) (standard); 2,519 long tons (2,559 t) (deep load)
- Length: 377 ft (114.9 m) (o/a)
- Beam: 36 ft 6 in (11.13 m)
- Draught: 11 ft 3 in (3.43 m)
- Installed power: 3 × Admiralty 3-drum boilers; 44,000 shp (33,000 kW)
- Propulsion: 2 × shafts; 2 × geared steam turbines
- Speed: 36 knots (67 km/h; 41 mph)
- Range: 5,700 nmi (10,600 km; 6,600 mi) at 15 knots (28 km/h; 17 mph)
- Complement: 190
- Sensors & processing systems: ASDIC
- Armament: 4 × twin 4.7 in (120 mm) guns; 1 × quadruple 2-pdr (40 mm (1.6 in)) AA guns; 2 × quadruple 0.5 in (12.7 mm) anti-aircraft machineguns; 1 × quadruple 21 in (533 mm) torpedo tubes; 20 × depth charges, 1 × rack, 2 × throwers

HMS Mohawk was one of 16 Tribal-class destroyers built for the Royal Navy shortly before the beginning of Second World War in 1939. Completed in 1938 the ship was initially assigned to the Mediterranean Fleet. She was briefly involved enforcing the arms blockade on the combatants in the Spanish Civil War in early 1939. Mohawk returned home shortly after the start of the Second World War and was assigned convoy escort duties, during which she was damaged by German bombers. She played an active role in the Norwegian Campaign of April–May 1940, escorting convoys to and from Norway.

The ship was assigned to the 14th Destroyer Flotilla (DF) of the Mediterranean Fleet in June and began escorting convoys to Malta and Greece. Mohawk played a minor role in the Battle of Calabria in July and the Battle of Cape Matapan in March 1941. The following month the ship was sunk by torpedoes fired by an Italian destroyer off the Tunisian coast as the 14th DF attacked an Italian convoy, with the loss of 41 of her crew.

== Description ==
The Tribals were intended to counter the large destroyers being built abroad and to improve the firepower of the existing destroyer flotillas and were thus significantly larger and more heavily armed than the preceding I class. The ships displaced 1,891 long tons (1,921 t) at standard load and 2,519 long tons (2,559 t) at deep load. They had an overall length of 377 feet (114.9 m), a beam of 36 feet 6 inches (11.13 m) and a draught of 11 feet 3 inches (3.43 m). The destroyers were powered by two Parsons geared steam turbines, each driving one propeller shaft using steam provided by three Admiralty three-drum boilers. The turbines developed a total of 44,000 shaft horsepower (33,000 kW) and gave a maximum speed of 36 knots (67 km/h; 41 mph). During her sea trials Mohawk made 36.2 knots (67.0 km/h; 41.7 mph) from 44,078 shp (32,869 kW) at a displacement of 2,017 long tons (2,049 t). The ships carried enough fuel oil to give them a range of 5,700 nautical miles (10,600 km; 6,600 mi) at 15 knots (28 km/h; 17 mph). The ships' complement consisted of 190 officers and ratings, although the flotilla leaders carried an extra 20 officers and men consisting of the Captain (D) and his staff.

The primary armament of the Tribal-class destroyers was eight quick-firing (QF) 4.7-inch (120 mm) Mark XII guns in four superfiring twin-gun mounts, one pair each fore and aft of the superstructure, designated 'A', 'B', 'X', and 'Y' from front to rear. The mounts had a maximum elevation of 40°. For anti-aircraft (AA) defence, they carried a single quadruple mount for the 40-millimetre (1.6 in) QF two-pounder Mk II "pom-pom" gun and two quadruple mounts for the 0.5-inch (12.7 mm) Mark III machine gun. Low-angle fire for the main guns was controlled by the director-control tower (DCT) on the bridge roof that fed data acquired by it and the 12-foot (3.7 m) rangefinder on the Mk II Rangefinder/Director directly aft of the DCT to an analogue mechanical computer, the Mk I Admiralty Fire Control Clock. Anti-aircraft fire for the main guns was controlled by the Rangefinder/Director which sent data to the mechanical Fuze Keeping Clock.

The ships were fitted with a single above-water quadruple mount for 21-inch (533 mm) torpedoes. The Tribals were not intended as anti-submarine ships, but they were provided with ASDIC, one depth charge rack and two throwers for self-defence, although the throwers were not mounted in all ships. Twenty depth charges was the peacetime allotment, but this increased to 30 during wartime.

=== Wartime modifications ===
Heavy losses to German air attack during the Norwegian Campaign demonstrated the ineffectiveness of the Tribals' anti-aircraft suite and the RN decided in May 1940 to replace 'X' mount with two QF 4-inch (102 mm) Mark XVI dual-purpose guns in a twin-gun mount. To better control the guns, the existing rangefinder/director was modified to accept a Type 285 gunnery radar as they became available. The number of depth charges was increased to 46 early in the war, and still more were added later. To increase the firing arcs of the AA guns, the rear funnel was shortened and the mainmast was reduced to a short pole mast.

== Construction and career ==
Authorized as one of seven Tribal-class destroyers under the 1935 Naval Estimates, Mohawk was the eleventh ship of her name to serve in the Royal Navy. The ship was ordered on 10 March 1936 from John I. Thornycroft & Company and was laid down on 16 July at the company's Woolston, Southampton, shipyard. Launched on 5 October 1937, Mohawk was completed on 7 September 1938 and commissioned two days later at a cost of £339,585 which excluded weapons and communications outfits furnished by the Admiralty. Under the command of Commander Richard Frank Jolly, the ship was initially assigned to the 1st Tribal Destroyer Flotilla with the Mediterranean Fleet and arrived at Malta on 13 October. The following month she patrolled the Malta-Egypt leg of the Royal Air Force (RAF)'s Long-Range Development Flight of three Vickers Wellesley bombers that were preparing to break the world flight distance record by flying from Egypt to Australia non-stop. At the end of the month, Mohawk ferried the British Ambassador to Turkey back to Istanbul from his annual visit to the Helles Memorial and then cruised through the Aegean Sea before returning to Malta.

The flotilla sailed to Gibraltar where the Mediterranean and Home Fleets were gathering for combined exercises. These ran from 28 February to 18 March 1939 and involved dozens of ships from both commands. Mohawk then patrolled the waters off the Mediterranean Spanish coast during the Spanish Civil War to enforce the arms embargo imposed on both sides by the Non-Intervention Committee. On 23 March the ship rescued the crew of a damaged German floatplane that had been forced to land off Barcelona and returned them to Mallorca. When Fascist Italy invaded Albania on 7 April, the Mediterranean Fleet was mobilised and remained on a war footing for most of May. During this time the 1st Tribal Destroyer Flotilla was redesignated as the 4th Destroyer Flotilla. By July 7 tensions had decreased such that Mohawk and her sisters Gurkha, Afridi, and Sikh were able to escort the aircraft carrier Glorious on a visit to Athens, Greece. The following month, the fleet spent a week exercising in the area between the Greek island of Crete and British Cyprus. As tensions rose in Europe later in August, the fleet was mobilised and continued to train in preparation for war with Italy. As part of its preparations, the Admiralty had closed the Mediterranean to British shipping and Mohawk and seven other destroyers escorted one group of ships that had collected at Suez, Egypt, through the Red Sea to reduce the congestion.

=== Second World War ===
When Britain declared war on Germany on 3 September, Mohawk was still in the Red Sea. As Italy took steps to prove her neutrality, the destroyers were released from their mission and returned to Alexandria where they began escorting convoys and conducting contraband inspections of non-British ships. This was not the best use of the Tribals and the 4th DF was ordered back to England in October. They arrived at Portland on the 13th and escorted a convoy northwards on 15–16 October. As the ships were approaching Rosyth, Scotland, the Luftwaffe made the first attack of the war on British territory, taking the British by surprise. Only one of Mohawk's AA guns was able to fire before a bomber from I Group/Bomber Wing 30 (Kampfgeschwader 30) dropped two bombs that straddled the destroyer. Near-missing the ship, the bombs detonated on impacting the water and sprayed splinters all along its upper deck, killing 15 men and wounding 30. Jolly was mortally wounded, but refused all assistance and continued to conn Mohawk until he passed out. He was posthumously awarded the Empire Gallantry Medal, which was later upgraded to the George Cross. The ship received temporary repairs at Rosyth before she sailed to Hawthorn Leslie's shipyard in Hebburn for permanent repairs. The oil tanker SS Inverland struck a mine on 14 December, while Mohawk and the destroyer Kelly were working up, but the British believed that the tanker had been torpedoed. The two ships were ordered to search for the U-boat believed to be responsible and blundered into the minefield. Kelly struck a mine that malfunctioned and did not detonate until it was just abaft the ship's stern. The detonation badly damaged her steering and caused her to take on water. Mohawk was able to take her in tow until a tugboat arrived, after which Mohawk escorted the ships back to the Hawthorn Leslie yard from which both ships had recently emerged.

The destroyer returned to escort duties afterwards, both for convoys and the Home Fleet. While escorting the newly completed ocean liner RMS Queen Elizabeth through the Firth of Clyde on 3 March 1940, Mohawk was slightly damaged when the cargo ship SS Gartbrattan collided with her; repairs were completed on 19 March. The 4th DF was then allocated to Plan R 4, a preemptive occupation of cities in western Norway after a German invasion had begun, and was tasked to escort the troop-laden ships of the 1st Cruiser Squadron to Bergen and Stavanger. The Germans decided to move first and occupied most Norwegian ports in a sea- and airborne assault (Operation Weserübung) on 9 April that took both the Norwegians and the Allies by surprise.

==== Norwegian Campaign ====
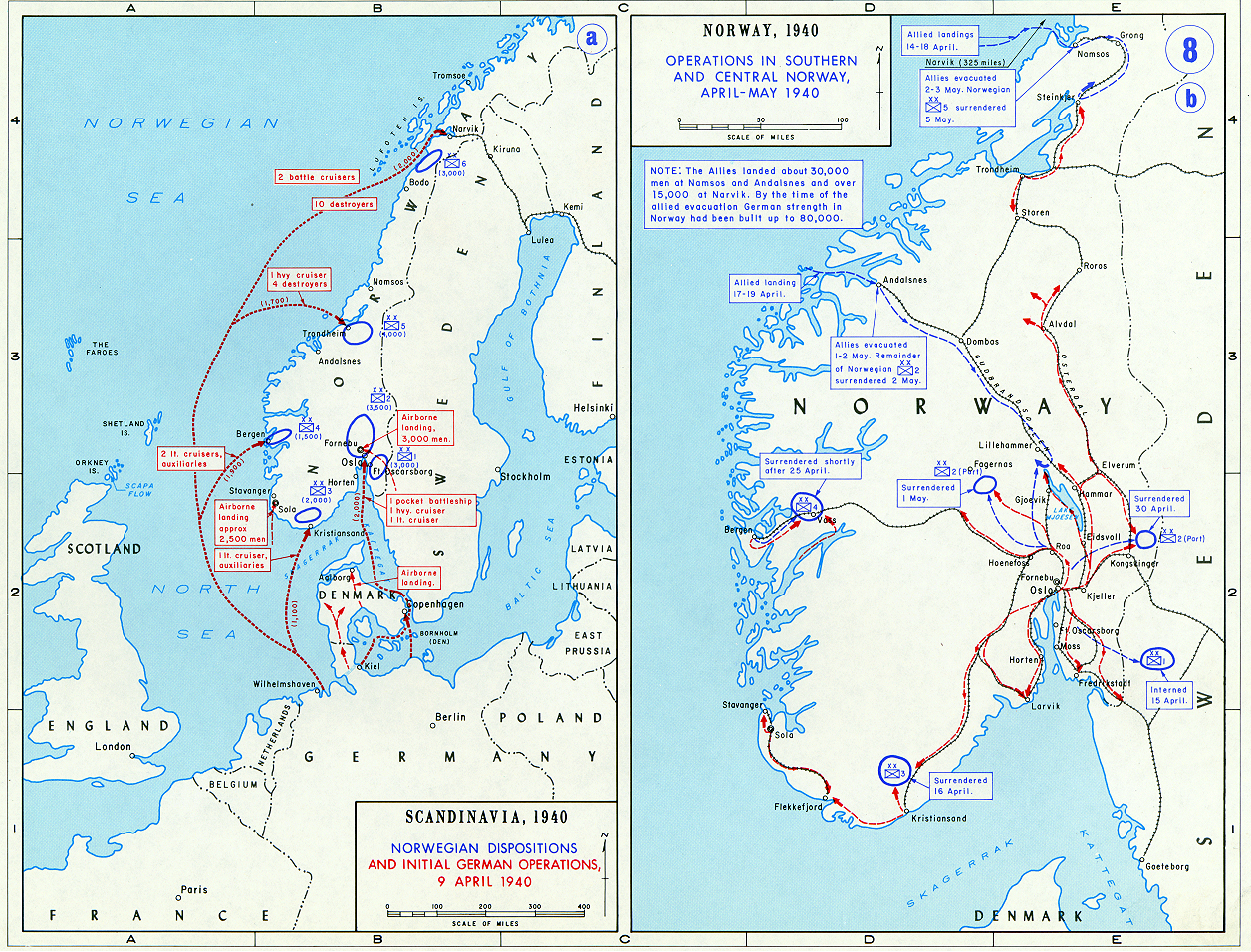
Maps covering the operations in central and southern Norway, April–May 1940

Receiving word that the RAF had attacked north-bound German warships in the North Sea on 7 April, the Home Fleet put to sea that evening. The 2nd Cruiser Squadron departed Rosyth with its two light cruisers, escorted by Mohawk and the rest of the 4th DF, with orders to sweep through the North Sea before rendezvousing with the main body of the Home Fleet. On the morning of 9 April the 4th DF, minus Tartar, was tasked with attacking Bergen, covered by the 18th Cruiser Squadron, but the Admiralty cancelled the attack that afternoon when it received reports that two German light cruisers were in port. As the British ships were falling back on the main body of the Home Fleet, they were attacked by 88 bombers of Bomber Wing 26 (Kampfgeschwader 26) and Bomber Wing 30, sinking Gurkha and lightly damaging the battleship Rodney.

After refuelling at Scapa Flow the following day, Mohawk, five of her sisters and two light cruisers departed on the evening of 11 April, arriving off Stadlandet the following morning. The destroyers were split up to search the area for German ships before rendezvousing with the cruisers at dusk, but an inaccurate spot report of a German battlecruiser and cruiser that afternoon forestalled the searches as the destroyers were recalled. On the morning of 13 April the destroyers were sent to search the Romsdalsfjord and only found four merchant ships. As they were leaving Ålesund they were unsuccessfully attacked by a dozen bombers from III Group, Demonstration Wing 1 (Lehrgeschwader 1). The following morning they were ordered north to the Namsos area to examine its suitability for an Allied landing and to coordinate with local Norwegian forces. Harbour facilities were assessed as inadequate and that troops should be landed elsewhere and transferred to destroyers for off-loading at Namsos. The Admiralty ordered that the 148th Infantry Brigade, already at sea, to be diverted to the anchorage at Lillesjona; its troopships arrived there at dawn on 16 April and began transferring their troops to the destroyers after they had completed refuelling. Half-a-dozen Luftwaffe bombers disrupted the transfer that afternoon with little effect. The destroyers unloaded their troops that night and the rest of the troops arrived the following evening. The destroyers and their covering cruisers were ordered home on 19 April.

Mohawk and four other destroyers escorted a small supply convoy to Åndalsnes and Molde that was so heavily attacked by the Luftwaffe on 27 April that they had to abort their mission before two of the ships could complete their unloading. The former town was set on fire, but the ships only suffered splinter damage. They were attacked again the following day as they withdrew. On 1–4 May Mohawk escorted the troopship HMS Royal Ulsterman as she transported No. 1 Independent Company to Mo i Rana. The ship embarked British diplomats in The Hague, the Netherlands, on the 11th. With tensions rising with Italy, the Admiralty ordered a total of 17 destroyers, including Mohawk and her sister Nubian transferred to the Mediterranean Fleet on 14 May, although the destroyer received a brief refit before departing.

==== Mediterranean service ====
En route to Alexandria, the ship suffered steering problems and had to divert to Gibraltar for repairs, finally arriving on 29 May to join the 14th DF. On 27–30 June Mohawk was part of the escort force for convoys coming from the Dardanelles and Greece to Port Said, Egypt. Italy declared war on 10 June and the fleet sortied that night and sailed to within 120 nmi (220 km; 140 mi) of the Italian coast, losing an elderly cruiser to an Italian submarine before returning to Alexandria on the 14th. Mohawk played a minor role in the Battle of Calabria on 8 July, escorting the battleship Warspite. Mohawk and Nubian, together with the destroyers Hero and Hostile, were ordered to Gibraltar on 22 August where they were to temporarily join Force H to escort reinforcements for the Mediterranean Fleet as part of Operation Hats. Nubian had engine problems that forced her to put into Malta for repairs while Hostile struck an Italian mine en route the following day off Cap Bon that broke her back. Mohawk took off the survivors while Hero scuttled Hostile with torpedoes. The three ships arrived in Gibraltar on the 29th; the following day, the destroyers proceeded to sea and rendezvoused with the fleet on 2 September.

Mohawk and Nubian were escorting the heavy cruiser Kent during a bombardment of Bardia, Italian Libya, on 17 September when she was torpedoed by an Italian torpedo bomber. Nubian towed her back to Alexandria while Mohawk escorted them until they arrived on the 19th. Three days later, the 14th DF, including Mohawk, bombarded the airfield at Sidi Barrani and nearby targets; the ship returned on 25 September, attacking truck concentrations. While the bulk of the Mediterranean Fleet covered the aircraft carrier Illustrious as her aircraft attack the Italian Fleet in Taranto on the night of 11/12 November, Vice-Admiral Henry Pridham-Wippell took three light cruisers, escorted by Mohawk and Nubian turned north to attack Italian shipping in the southern Adriatic Sea. They encountered a small convoy of four ships, escorted by the auxiliary cruiser Ramb III and the torpedo boat Nicola Fabrizi. Mohawk was the first to open fire, claiming a hit on Ramb III and then one on the torpedo boat, although both ships were able to break contact. The cruisers sank all of the merchantmen before reuniting with the main body. On the night of 11/12 December, the destroyer escorted the monitor Terror as she bombarded Italian positions near Sollum, Egypt.

==== 1941 ====
Mohawk was one of the escorts for the battleships of the Mediterranean Fleet as they bombarded Bardia on 3 January 1941. The following week she participated in Operation Excess, a series of convoys to resupply Malta and convey reinforcement for the Mediterranean Fleet past Malta. The ship was part of the escort force for the main body of the fleet until one of the other escorts, the destroyer Gallant, struck a mine on 10 January that blew off her bow; Mohawk was detailed to tow her stern-first to Malta where they arrived the following day. After refuelling she departed to go to the assistance of the light cruisers Southampton and Gloucester which had been attacked by German Junkers Ju 87 "Stuka" dive bombers. The former's fires burnt out of control and she had to be scuttled. The 14th DF covered the bombardment of Tobruk by the Inshore Squadron on the night of 19/20 January. A few days later, the flotilla formed part of the escort for the damaged Illustrious as she steamed from Malta to Alexandria on 23–25 January.

For most of the Battle of Cape Matapan, Mohawk and the 14th DF escorted the fleet's battleships, but they were detached at dusk on 28 March to find and sink the badly damaged Italian battleship Vittorio Veneto. The flotilla turned around about six hours later based on an erroneous report of a drifting battleship and spotted the burning heavy cruiser Zara early on the morning of the 29th after she had been crippled by the British battleships at point-blank range the previous evening. The British ships picked up survivors and torpedoed the wreck. About an hour later they discovered the drifting heavy cruiser Pola which had had all power knocked out by a torpedo hit earlier in the day. The British rescued the survivors crewmen before sinking the cruiser with three torpedoes and rejoining the main body of the fleet.

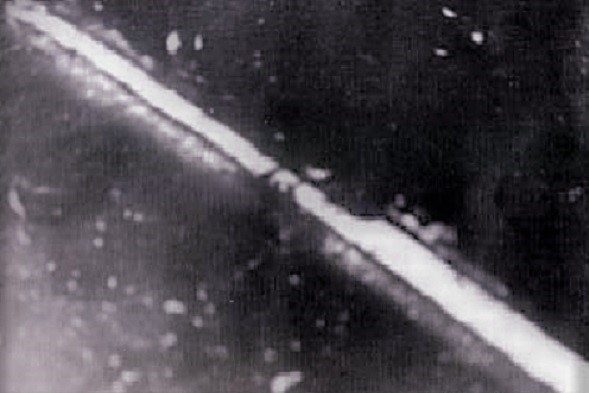
Mohawk's wreck lying in shallow water

The 14th DF escorted a convoy from Egypt to Greece from 1 to 6 April, although the convoy was attacked by Luftwaffe bombers, none of the destroyers were damaged. The flotilla arrived at Malta on 10/11 April with orders to interdict the Italian supply convoys between Italy and Libya at night. The first two patrols were uneventful, but British aircraft had located a small convoy off the Tunisian coast on the afternoon of the 15th. The destroyers sortied at dusk to search for the convoy and spotted it in the early hours of 16 April. The convoy consisted of five cargo ships escorted by three destroyers. Captain Philip Mack, commander of the 14th DF, manoeuvred his ships to silhouette the convoy against the moon and closed to a range of only 2,400 yd (2,200 m) before his flagship, Jervis and her sister Janus opened fire on the trailing destroyer, Baleno, at 02:20, quickly disabling her guns and turbines, and setting her on fire.

Mohawk and Nubian were in the rear of the formation and engaged the rearmost freighter, SS Sabaudia, which was carrying a load of ammunition, causing an explosion and setting her on fire. As the sisters advanced down the side of the convoy, Mohawk withheld fire as all of the targets were being engaged. By 02:35 the leading escort, the destroyer Luca Tarigo, had turned back and was taken under fire by all of the British ships. As the Italian ship was sinking, her crew was able to fire two torpedoes under manual control. The first of these struck Mohawk just after she had turned to avoid being rammed by the freighter SS Arta as the destroyer passed through the convoy shortly after 02:45. The torpedo hit Mohawk on the starboard side abreast 'Y' gun mount, knocking out both aft mounts and blowing off the upper stern. Although the ship had stopped and was awash up to 'X' mount, the chief engineer reported five minutes later that he believed that the propellers and their shafts were intact and that the ship could move. Before he could do so, another torpedo struck the port side on the bulkhead that separated the middle and aft boiler rooms at 02:53. Its detonation caused the aft boiler to explode and the upper deck to split down the middle. Mohawk capsized a minute later with her stern touching the shallow bottom with the loss of 41 crewmen. The British ships rescued her surviving crew and Janus had to put four shells into her buoyant forecastle to put the ship fully underwater off the Kerkennah Islands.

== Sources ==
- Admiralty Historical Section (2000). Naval Operations of the Campaign in Norway, April–June 1940. Whitehall Histories: Naval Staff Histories. London: Frank Cass. ISBN 0-7146-5119-2.
- Admiralty Historical Section (2002a). The Royal Navy and the Mediterranean. Whitehall Histories, Naval Staff Histories. Vol. I: September 1939 – October 1941. London: Whitehall History in association with Frank Cass. ISBN 0-7146-5179-6.
- Admiralty Historical Section (2002b). The Royal Navy and the Mediterranean. Whitehall Histories, Naval Staff Histories. Vol. II: November 1940 – December 1941. London: Whitehall History in association with Frank Cass. ISBN 0-7146-5205-9.
- Brice, Martin H. (1971). The Tribals. London: Ian Allan. ISBN 0-7110-0245-2.
- English, John (2001). Afridi to Nizam: British Fleet Destroyers 1937–43. Gravesend, Kent: World Ship Society. ISBN 0-905617-64-9.
- Friedman, Norman (2006). British Destroyers and Frigates, the Second World War and After. Annapolis, Maryland: Naval Institute Press. ISBN 1-86176-137-6.
- Haarr, Geirr H. (2009). The German Invasion of Norway, April 1940. Annapolis, Maryland: Naval Institute Press. ISBN 978-1-59114-310-9.
- Haarr, Geirr H. (2010). The Battle for Norway: April–June 1940. Annapolis, Maryland: Naval Institute Press. ISBN 978-1-59114-051-1.
- Haarr, Geirr H. (2013). The Gathering Storm: The Naval War in Northern Europe September 1939 – April 1940. Annapolis, Maryland: Naval Institute Press. ISBN 978-1-59114-331-4.
- Hodges, Peter (1971). Tribal Class Destroyers: Royal Navy and Commonwealth. London: Almark Publishing. ISBN 0-85524-047-4.
- Lenton, H. T. (1998). British & Empire Warships of the Second World War. Annapolis, Maryland: Naval Institute Press. ISBN 1-55750-048-7.
- O'Hara, Vincent (2009). Struggle for the Middle Sea: The Great Navies at War in the Mediterranean Theater, 1940–1945. Annapolis, Maryland: Naval Institute Press. ISBN 978-1-59114-648-3.
- Rohwer, Jürgen (2005). Chronology of the War at Sea 1939–1945: The Naval History of World War Two (Third Revised ed.). Annapolis, Maryland: Naval Institute Press. ISBN 1-59114-119-2.
- Whitley, M. J. (1988). Destroyers of World War Two: An International Encyclopedia. Annapolis, Maryland: Naval Institute Press. ISBN 0-87021-326-1.
