= Battle of the Tarigo Convoy =

1941 naval battle of World War II near Tunisia

Coordinates: 35°9′27.13″N 11°30′49.22″E

- Part of the Battle of the Mediterranean of the Second World War
- Relief map of the Mediterranean Sea
Date	16 April 1941
Location	Off the Kerkennah Islands, Tunisia, in the Mediterranean
Result	British victory

Belligerents
United Kingdom	Italy

Commanders and leaders
Philip Mack	Pietro de Cristofaro †

Strength
4 destroyers; 2 reconnaissance aircraft	3 destroyers; 4 merchant ships; 1 ammunition ship; 1 reconnaissance aircraft

Casualties and losses
43 killed; 1 destroyer sunk	350–1,800 killed; 2 destroyers sunk; 1 destroyer beached; 4 cargo ships sunk or destroyed
- The Kerkennah Islands, off Tunisia

The Battle of the Tarigo Convoy (sometimes called the Action off Sfax) was a naval battle of the Second World War, part of the Battle of the Mediterranean. The battle was fought on 16 April 1941, between four Royal Navy destroyers and three Italian destroyers of the Regia Marina that were escorting a convoy near the Kerkennah Islands off Sfax, on the Tunisian coast.

Control of the sea between Italy and Libya was important to both sides to protect their convoys and attack those of their opponent. Axis convoys to North Africa supplied Italian colonists and Axis military forces. British attacks came from Malta, also dependent upon convoys for supplies.

The five ships in the convoy were sunk or run aground, along with their three destroyer escorts, one being refloated later in the year, for the loss of a British destroyer. The British success alleviated the pressure from Winston Churchill and the Admiralty in London on Admiral Andrew Cunningham to do more about Italian supply convoys.

== Background ==
=== British strategy ===
On 4 April, the Admiralty pressed Admiral Andrew Cunningham, commander of the Mediterranean Fleet, to bombard Tripoli, the entrepôt of Italian Libya. Cunningham thought that a bombardment would expose the ships to air attacks from bases in Tripoli and Sicily for little in return. The use of the obsolete battleship HMS Centurion as a block ship was mooted but it would have to sail from Britain through the narrows between Sicily and Tunisia then survive the 180 nmi (210 mi; 330 km) from Malta to Tripoli undetected. Churchill sent a directive on 14 April that the Mediterranean Fleet was to cut the Axis supply link from Italy to Libya, regardless of loss.

Tripoli was to be bombarded and mined and an operational battleship was to be considered for use as a block ship if the Centurion proposal fell through. The Admiralty let Cunningham know that the battleship HMS Barham and the cruiser Caledon were to be used to bombard the port as they approached then be sunk to block the port. Cunningham was reluctant to throw away a third of his battleship force on an enterprise he considered futile and even with skeleton crews about 1,000 men would be lost; Cunningham signalled that he would rather use the fleet to bombard the port instead.

=== Italian convoys ===
Tunisia in red

The usual route for Italian convoys from Italy to Libya was round the west of Sicily and down the Tunisian coast to Tripoli, with occasional excursions to Benghazi. Some supplies delivered to Tripoli were transferred to coasters and carried eastwards to the smaller ports along the Libyan shore, to reduce the pressure on the Libyan road transport system; some coasters had been attacked and sunk by British submarines. The route through Tunisian coastal waters was about 400 nmi (740 km; 460 mi) for which fighter escort in the central part of the journey was difficult to provide so it was usually traversed at night. Convoys to and from Italy often comprised four Italian or German ships and sailed at two-to-three day intervals, German ships transporting German troops and equipment. Escort was provided by the Regia Marina (Italian Royal Navy) organised by the Italian naval authorities. The move of the German 5th Light Motorised Division began at the start of February 1941 and by March fifteen convoys had arrived carrying 25,000 men, 8,500 vehicles and 26,000 long tons (26,000 t) of supplies and equipment. By late May the 15th Panzer Division had arrived and the movement of Italian troops resumed.

=== Malta ===
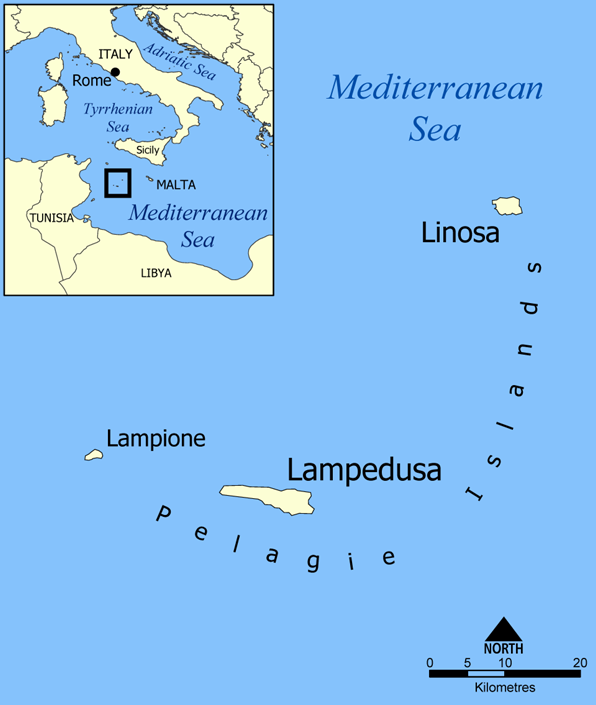
Map of the Pelagian Islands, including Lampedusa, Linosa and Lampione

By March 1941, Cunningham, believed that the Axis air threat to Malta had receded, due to Axis air losses and the diversion of Fliegerkorps X to the Balkans. The first twelve new Hurricane Mk II fighters had arrived at Malta during Operation Winch, which were faster than the Mk I and could carry long-range fuel tanks. On 8 April, Cunningham ordered a Malta Striking Force to be formed, the four most modern destroyers in the Mediterranean Fleet were to sail to Malta and begin operations against Axis supply convoys. The force comprised the J-class destroyers (1,690 tons) flotilla leader HMS Jervis (Captain Philip Mack, the commander Captain (D) of the 14th Destroyer Flotilla, Janus (Commander J. A. W. Tothill), both carrying six 4.7-inch guns and ten torpedo tubes and the Tribal-class destroyers (1,870 tons) Nubian (Commander R. W. Ravenhill) and Mohawk (Commander J. W. M. Eaton) armed with eight 4.7-inch guns and four torpedo tubes; all but Jervis were equipped with radar.

=== British destroyer sorties ===
Until February 1941 Allied ships and aircraft were not allowed to attack isolated ships or small groups without escorts beyond 30 nmi (35 mi; 56 km) of the Libyan coast or if the ships were believed to be Italian, further than 30 nmi (56 km; 35 mi) from any Italian land. Axis ships could sail in Tunisian territorial waters, immune from attack. On 5 February, British forces were given permission to attack Axis ships on sight south of Malta and later in the month this was extended to include most of the central Mediterranean; the Admiralty also announced early in March that British ships would enter French North African territorial waters and warned Vichy ships to remain in harbour during the night. From February to May 1941, nine German ships of 31,243 GRT were sunk and nine (54,753 GRT) damaged. Had the Axis been able to use Tunisian ports the sea journey would have been so short that British opportunities to attack Axis shipping would have been much reduced. French prevarication and the imminence of Operation Barbarossa, the German invasion of the Soviet Union, led Hitler to avoid trouble with the Vichy French authorities.

Jervis and Janus sailed from Suda Bay in Crete on 10 April with Nubian and Mohawk following an hour later with two light cruisers providing cover on the night of 10/11 April; the journey was unopposed and the ships docked at Malta in the morning of 11 April. In the afternoon of 11 April an Axis convoy of four freighters and thee torpedo boats, which had sailed from Palermo for Tripoli, was spotted heading southwards between Lampione Island and the Kerkennah Banks, which extend about 30 nmi (35 mi; 56 km) east of Sfax, by a British reconnaissance aeroplane. The 14th Destroyer Flotilla was ordered to attack the convoy in conjunction with Fairey Swordfish aircraft of the Fleet Air Arm (FAA). The ships and aircraft failed to find the convoy and returned to Malta on 12 April. As soon as the destroyers had refuelled, they were ordered to sea after the sighting of a convoy of five merchant ships and three destroyers, which had sailed from Naples at 5:33 p.m. on 11 April and was nearing the Gulf of Hammamet. The Italians now knew of the ships based at Malta and ninety minutes after dark, aware of the shadowing Swordfish aircraft, reversed course and sailed quickly north, going round the west of Pantellaria at 2:30 a.m. on 13 April. The British ships again failed to find the convoy and two Swordfish of 830 Naval Air Squadron FAA were lost attacking the Italian ships.

== Prelude ==
=== Tarigo Convoy ===
In mid-April 1941, a five-ship Axis convoy sailed from Naples, en route to Tripoli. It consisted of the twentieth sea-transport group of the German troopships, Adana (4,205 GRT), Arta (2,452 GRT), Ægina (2,447 GRT) and Iserlohn (3,704 GRT), and the Italian ammunition ship Sabaudia (1,590 GRT). The convoy was escorted by the Navigatori-class destroyer Luca Tarigo (flagship, Capitano di Fregata Pietro de Cristofaro, 1,628 long tons (1,654 t), armed with six 4.7-inch guns and four torpedo tubes) and the Folgore-class destroyers Baleno (Capitano di Corvetta G. Arnaud) and Lampo (Capitano di Corvetta E. Marano), both of 1,220 long tons (1,240 t) and armed with four 4.7-inch guns and six torpedo tubes. The convoy was delayed by bad weather, sailing from Naples at 11:00 p.m. on 13 April.

=== Malta destroyers ===
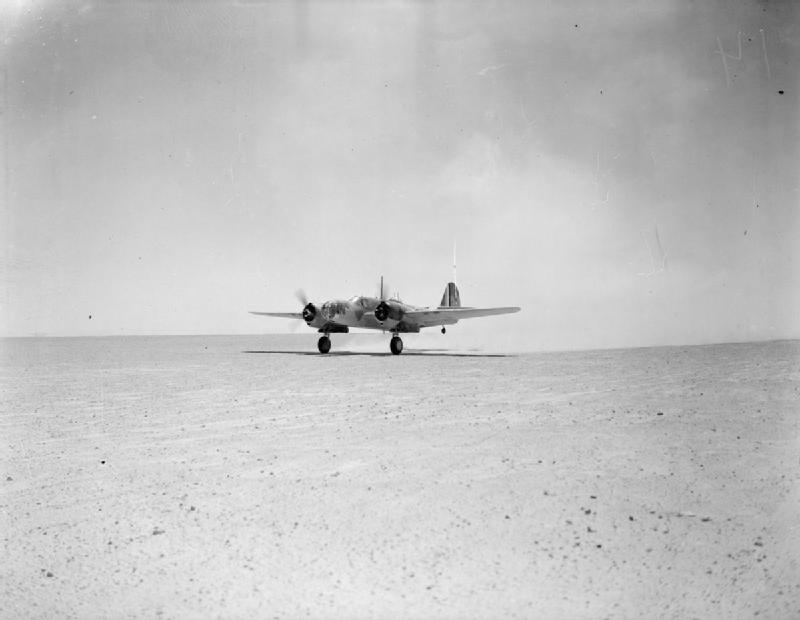
Example of a Martin Maryland taking off

The British had been alerted to the convoy's sailing by intercepted radio messages. On 15 April, a British Maryland reconnaissance aircraft found the convoy and broadcast a sighting report of the composition, speed [9 kn (10 mph; 17 km/h)] and direction (south) of the convoy. Another Maryland was sent from Malta to observe the convoy and the 14th Destroyer Flotilla was alerted, sailing at 6:00 p.m. in rain and low cloud. There were at least six buoys arranged in a semicircle to the north, east and south-east of the Kerkennah Islands, marking the shallows. The flotilla formed line ahead and increased speed to 26 kn (30 mph; 48 km/h) to get in front of the convoy near the Kerkennah Number 4 buoy. At 5:00 p.m. the convoy was spotted again by an aircraft and its composition, location, speed and course reported to Malta. The information was transmitted to Mack, which he received at 7:25 p.m. Da Cristofaro knew that the convoy had been spotted and requested fighter cover and a reconnaissance ahead of the route of the convoy.

The bad weather led to the fighters being grounded and only one of two SM.79 bombers managing to take off from Syracuse at 5:15 p.m. before returning early at 6:45 p.m. without seeing the British destroyers. Da Cristofaro continued towards Tripoli, not knowing that the British were at sea. At 0:44 a.m. early on 16 April, about 6 nmi (11 km; 6.9 mi) off the Kerkennah Number 4 buoy, Mack altered course to 310° with another change at 1:00 a.m. to bring the destroyers onto the opposite course of the convoy. The destroyers began to zigzag at 1:10 a.m. and the destroyers reached the predicted position of the convoy at 1:42 a.m. but the convoy was not there. Mack ordered an increase in speed to 25 kn (29 mph; 46 km/h) and at 1:55 a.m. reached the place where the convoy would have been 3 nmi (3.5 mi; 5.6 km) if it had slowed to 7 kn (8.1 mph; 13 km/h) but again, nothing could be seen. If the convoy had reversed course then finding it would have been impossible so Mack assumed that it had sailed closer to the Tunisian coast and turned towards Kerkennah Number 1 buoy at 1:55 a.m. and after three minutes the convoy could be seen on a bearing of 170° about 6 nmi (6.9 mi; 11 km) way. At 1:59 a.m. Jervis signalled "Enemy in sight to port" and the destroyers began their attack.

== Action ==
At 2:00 a.m. the destroyers changed course to 140° at 27 kn (31 mph; 50 km/h) and at 2:02 a.m. Mack signalled for their torpedo tubes to be trained to starboard. The destroyers changed course again at 2:03 a.m. to 210° to get the convoy between the destroyers and the moon, Mack ordering the destroyers to train their torpedo tubes to port. The convoy was more distinct and comprised five ships with one large and two small destroyer escorts. Jervis commenced firing at 2:20 a.m. at Baleno which was to starboard at 2,400 yd (2,200 m) achieving hits with its main guns and pom-poms. After two minutes Janus also fired at Baleno at the same range and hit with its first salvo. The captain of Baleno and most of the officers were killed in the first salvos and the ship set on fire; the surviving crew ran Baleno onto a sandbank before it sank. Nubian opened fire at 2:20 a.m. at Sabaudia at the rear of the convoy and at the third salvo caused an explosion and a fire to start. Nubian changed targets to Iserlohn and Ægina, hitting both. At 2:23 a.m. lookouts on Nubian saw Tarigo on a reciprocal course at about 1,000 yd (910 m) on the starboard beam. Nubian accelerated towards Tarigo then away, firing with its 4.7-inch guns, pom-poms and machine-guns, hitting the bridge and the rear of the hull. Tarigo replied but fire was checked by Nubian when Mohawk turned and got in the way.

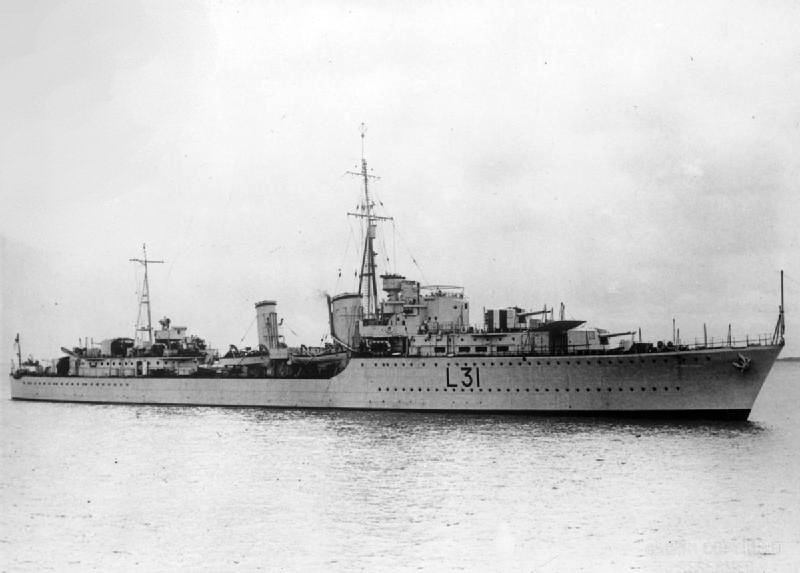
HMS Mohawk (F31)

Tarigo passed down the starboard side of the British destroyers, suffering severe damage from the fire of Jervis and Mohawk. Jervis hit the bridge with its first salvo and caused a fire. Cristofaro lost a leg to a shell-splinter but stayed in command until he died from loss of blood. (Note: Commander Pietro de Cristofaro was posthumously awarded the Medaglia d'Oro, the highest Italian military decoration.) At 2:40 a.m. Jervis fired a torpedo and claimed a hit on the aft of Tarigo, then fired and missed a freighter which was already on fire. Janus began to fire at 2:30 a.m. on Iserlohn, quickly achieving hits then fired three torpedoes at three merchantmen, claiming a hit on one. Jervis fired two torpedoes at Tarigo as it passed by but missed astern. The gun-crews on Janus could not train the main armament on Tarigo due to its speed but the pom-pom gunners obtained hits. At 2:41 a.m. Janus turned to port and engaged Sabaudia to the east, which disappeared in a big explosion, smoke and flames towering 2,000 ft (610 m) above the sea. Fragments of ammunition up to 20 lb (9.1 kg) rained on the sea and on Jervis, 1,500 yd (1,400 m) away. Nubian turned to port at about 2:30 a.m., crossing the bow of the foremost merchant ship, which tried to ram Mohawk which was following Nubian.

Mohawk evaded the merchant ship by crossing to its port side, before turning starboard to attacking the freighter. During the starboard turn Mohawk was hit by a torpedo to the rear, near Y gun, which blew off the stern and brought Mohawk to a stop. The forward guns opened fire on what was thought to be Arta, which was hit, caught fire and also stopped. Mohawk's stern superstructure had gone, yet the propellers and rudder remained operational; five minutes after the first torpedo hit Mohawk was hit again, the torpedo exploding on the port side in the area between boiler rooms 2 and 3. The destroyer began to sink upright and the crew was brought on deck, then the ship listed to port and sank, the rear of the ship going under water as far as the torpedo tubes; the abandon ship was given. Nubian was signalled at 2:36 a.m. that Mohican had been torpedoed and passed it to Jervis. The bridge officers on Mohawk thought that they had been torpedoed randomly by Tarigo while it was stopped and on fire but the launch was deliberate, an ensign managing to fire the torpedoes. From 2:47 a.m. to 2:59 a.m. Janus bombarded Tarigo leaving it dead in the water but at 3:11 a.m. another torpedo was fired which passed under Jervis which opened rapid fire on Tarigo until it was too far aft for its guns to bear. Janus closed to 2,000 yd (1,800 m) to finish off Tarigo, which suffered an explosion amidships, followed by a fire and developed a list to starboard, obviously sinking. Nubian, having reported to Mack that Mohawk had been torpedoed, spotted Lampo to port and engaged, soon leaving it on fire and sinking.

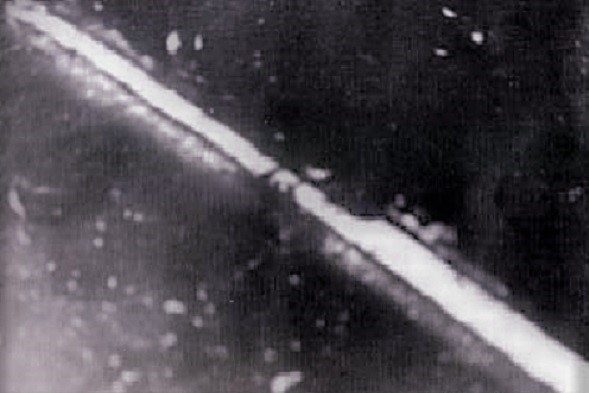
The wreck of HMS Mohawk photographed from an Italian reconnaissance aircraft (1941)

Nubian chased Adana which was fleeing to the south-west, overhauled it and left it on fire. The crew on Mohawk was prevented from lowering the boats by the list but six Carley floats were launched, the rest of the crew having to take to the water. Nubian began to rescue survivors at 3:13 a.m. and Jervis joined in at 3:23 a.m. Janus detected a contact by radar at 3:26 a.m. at 10,000 yd (9,100 m) on a bearing of 330° and raced towards it only to turn away in shallow water (the contacts were ships aground on a sandbank) and rejoin the rescue operation. The crew of Mohawk was rescued but 42 men had been killed. When the rescue was complete, about 100 ft (30 m) of the keel of Mohawk was visible up to 6 ft (1.8 m) above the water. Janus fired into the hull to puncture it and Mohawk sank in 7 fathoms (42 ft; 13 m) of water. Just after 4:00 a.m. the three remaining British destroyers sailed for Malta, low cloud preventing air attacks, the ships reaching harbour at 10:00 a.m. on 16 April. Adana and Arta had been run aground and Baleno sank during the morning on 16 April.

== Aftermath ==
=== Analysis ===
The destruction of the convoy had been achieved by one attack, which Allied submarine and aircraft could not yet emulate, the RN ships had shown what they could and do and the disaster marked the end of relatively unopposed Axis supply convoys to Libya, which they had enjoyed since June 1940. Supermarina continued to dispatch convoys to Libya and two arrived unopposed four days after the disaster. Supermarina considered that the loss of the Tarigo Convoy was caused by bad luck, the convoy having been spotted by British air reconnaissance. The German naval staff criticised the Italian navy for a lack of foresight and action, the Germans having pointed out the importance of mining the waters off Tripoli since February but minelaying had been postponed several times until 1 May. The British tried to base more destroyers and cruisers at Malta but Luftwaffe bombing and the catastrophe in Greece, which needed every ship to evacuate the British and Greek forces, ended this plan. Malta was still an offensive base and in May, a record eleven ships of 47,507 GRT were sunk.

=== Subsequent events ===
Medaglia d'Oro

Commander Pietro de Cristofaro was posthumously awarded the Medaglia d'Oro, the highest Italian military decoration. The Italians found the wreck of Mohawk, settled on her port side in shallow water. During April, May and June 1941, Italian divers, disguised as local fishermen, retrieved documents and other material from the wreck. In 1998, researchers asserted that documents recovered were essential to the Raid on Alexandria. The destroyer Lampo was raised from the shallow water after four months of salvage work and repaired by May 1942 only to be sunk on 30 April 1943. Adana sank several hours after the engagement and the wreck of Arta was destroyed by the crew of the submarine Upholder, using explosive charges, on the night of 26 April 1941.

=== Casualties ===
In 2005, Rohwer and Hümmelchen wrote that during the next day, the destroyers Vivaldi, da Noli, Malocello and Dardo, with the torpedo boats Clio, Centauro, Giuseppe Sirtori, Perseo and Partenope with the hospital ship Giuseppe Orlando from Tripoli and the hospital ship Arno and the ships Capacitas and Antoinetta, that were off Sfax, were sent to the scene. Supported by air/sea rescue aircraft the ships rescued 1,271 (or 1,248) troops from the approximately 3,000 embarked on the merchant ships. In the 2004 edition of the 1956 official history volume, "The Germans come to the help of their Ally", Ian Playfair, the British official historian, wrote that German casualties were 350 men, 300 vehicles and 3,500 long tons (3,600 t) of stores for a loss of Mohawk and 42 members of its crew. In 2009, Vincent O'Hara wrote that the British suffered the loss of 41 men from Mohawk and minor splinter damage to the three surviving destroyers against an Axis loss of 1,700 men, 300 vehicles and 3,500 long tons (3,600 t) of supplies.

== Orders of battle ==
=== Royal Navy ===
14th Destroyer Flotilla
Ship	Flag	Type	Notes
HMS Mohawk	Royal Navy	Tribal-class destroyer	14th Destroyer Flotilla, sunk
HMS Nubian	Royal Navy	Tribal-class destroyer	14th Destroyer Flotilla
HMS Jervis	Royal Navy	J-class destroyer	14th Destroyer Flotilla, Captain (D) Philip Mack
HMS Janus	Royal Navy	J-class destroyer	14th Destroyer Flotilla

=== Regia Marina ===
Destroyer escorts
Ship	Flag	Type	Notes
Luca Tarigo	Kingdom of Italy	Navigatori-class destroyer	8th Destroyer Squadron, flag, Captain Pietro de Cristofaro, sunk
Baleno	Kingdom of Italy	Folgore-class destroyer	8th Destroyer Squadron, sunk
Lampo	Kingdom of Italy	Folgore-class destroyer	8th Destroyer Squadron, damaged

=== Tarigo convoy ===
Axis merchant ships
Ship	Year	Flag	GRT	Notes
Adana	1922	Nazi Germany	4,205	Sunk off Kerkennah Islands, 16 April 1941
Ægina	1922	Nazi Germany	2,447	Sunk off Kerkennah Islands, 16 April 1941
Iserlohn	1922	Nazi Germany	3,704	Sunk off Kerkennah Islands, 16 April 1941
Arta	1921	Merchant Navy	2,452	Ran aground Kerkennah Islands, 16 April 1941, scuttled 26 April by HMS Upholder
Sabaudia	1911	Merchant Navy	1,590	Ammunition ship, sunk off Kerkennah Islands, 16 April 1941
