= Folgore-class destroyer =

1930s and WWII Royal Italian Navy vessels

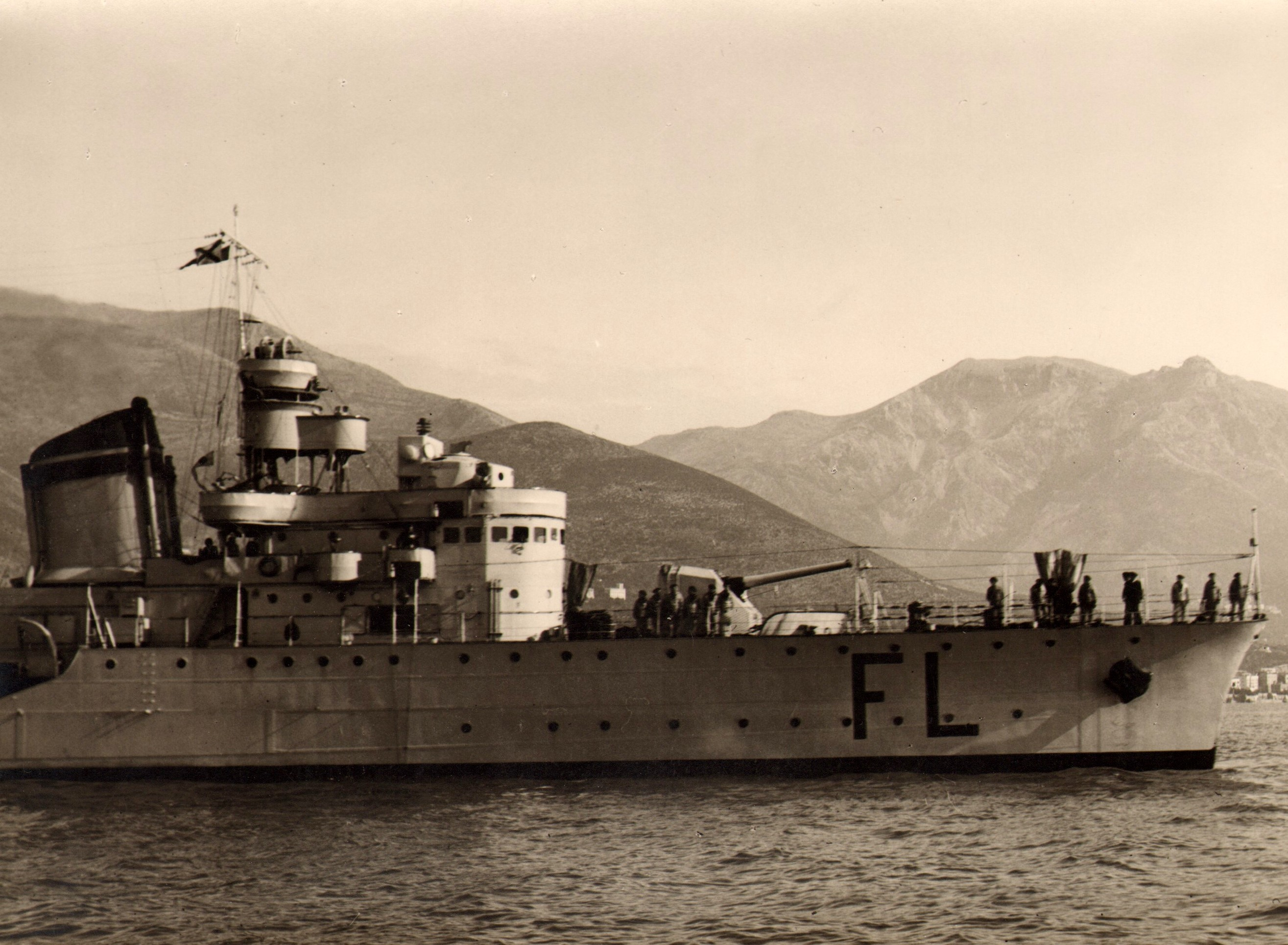
- Fulmine

Class overview
- Name: Folgore class
- Operators: Regia Marina
- Preceded by: Freccia class
- Succeeded by: Maestrale class
- Built: 1929–1931
- In commission: 1932–1943
- Completed: 4
- Lost: 4

General characteristics (as built)
- Type: Destroyer
- Displacement: 1,220 long tons (1,240 t) (standard); 2,100 long tons (2,100 t) (full load)
- Length: 95.9 m (314 ft 8 in)
- Beam: 9.2 m (30 ft 2 in)
- Draught: 3.3–4.5 m (10 ft 10 in – 14 ft 9 in)
- Installed power: 3 Thornycroft boilers; 44,000 hp (33,000 kW)
- Propulsion: 2 shafts; 2 geared steam turbines
- Speed: 30 knots (56 km/h; 35 mph)
- Range: 3,600 nmi (6,700 km; 4,100 mi) at 12 knots (22 km/h; 14 mph)
- Complement: 185
- Armament: 2 × twin 120 mm (4.7 in) guns; 2 × single 40 mm (1.6 in) AA guns; 2 × twin 13.2 mm (0.52 in) machine guns; 2 × triple 533 mm (21 in) torpedo tubes; 2 × depth charge throwers; 52 mines

The Folgore class were a group of four destroyers built for the Regia Marina (Royal Italian Navy) in the 1930s. None of the ships survived World War II.

== Design and description ==
The Folgore-class destroyers were extremely similar to the preceding Freccia class; their beam was reduced to improve their speed over that achieved by the earlier ships but this was a failure. The Folgores had an overall length of 96.05 meters (315 ft 1 in), a beam of 9.2 meters (30 ft 2 in) and a mean draft of 3.3 meters (10 ft 10 in) and 4.3 meters (14 ft 1 in) at deep load. They displaced 1,238 metric tons (1,218 long tons) at standard load, and 2,090 metric tons (2,060 long tons) at deep load. Their complement during wartime was 185 officers and enlisted men.

The Folgores were powered by two Belluzzo geared steam turbines, each driving one propeller shaft using steam supplied by three Thornycroft boilers. The turbines were designed to produce 44,000 shaft horsepower (33,000 kW) and a speed of 30 knots (56 km/h; 35 mph) in service, although the ships reached speeds of 38–39 knots (70–72 km/h; 44–45 mph) during their sea trials while lightly loaded. They carried enough fuel oil to give them a range of 3,600 nautical miles (6,700 km; 4,100 mi) at a speed of 12 knots (22 km/h; 14 mph).

Their main battery consisted of four 50-caliber Cannone da 120 mm (4.7 in)/50 A Modello 1926 guns in two twin-gun turrets, one each fore and aft of the superstructure. Anti-aircraft (AA) defense for the Folgore-class ships was provided by a pair of 39-caliber Cannone da 40 mm (1.6 in)/39 AA guns in single mounts amidships and a pair of twin-gun mounts for Breda 13.2-millimeter (0.52 in) Modello 1931 machine guns. They were equipped with six 533-millimeter (21 in) torpedo tubes in two triple mounts amidships. Although the ships were not provided with a sonar system for anti-submarine work, they were fitted with a pair of depth charge throwers. The Folgores could carry 52 mines.

== Ships ==
- Baleno

Built by CNQ Fiume, completed 15 June 1932.
On 14 June 1940 she sank the submarine HMS Odin in the Gulf of Taranto.
She was disabled on 16 April 1941 by British destroyers Jervis, Nubian, Mohawk and Janus during the Battle of the Tarigo Convoy, ran aground and sank on the following morning. Only 37 of her crew survived, among the killed there was the commanding officer, Lt. Cdr. Giuseppe Arnaud.

- Folgore

Built by OC Partenopei, Naples, completed 1 July 1932.
She was sunk on 2 December 1942 by British cruisers of Force Q during the Battle of Skerki Bank, while trying to protect the convoy she was escorting. 124 men, including the commanding officer Lt. Cdr. Ener Bettica, went down with the ship.

- Fulmine

Built by CNQ Fiume, completed 14 September 1932.
She was sunk on 9 November 1941 by British surface ships of Force K during the Battle of the Duisburg Convoy. 141 men were lost, among them the CO Lt. Cdr. Mario Milano.

- Lampo

Built by OC Partenopei, Naples, completed 13 August 1932.
Disabled by British destroyers on 16 April 1941 during the Battle of the Tarigo Convoy, she ran aground with 141 of her 205 crew killed in action, but she was later salvaged and put back into service. She was sunk by bombers on 30 April 1943 off Cape Bon, while carrying ammunition to Tunisia, with the loss of 60 out of 213 crewmen.

=== Turkish Ships ===
Four similar ships were built in Italy for the Turkish Navy:

- The Tinaztepe-class destroyers were similar to the Italian ships but fitted with two funnels. These ships were built by Cantiere navale di Riva Trigoso.
- The Adatepe-class destroyers were altered to have four single guns rather than two twin guns and were lengthened to compensate. These ships were built by Ansaldo in Genoa.

== Bibliography ==
- Brescia, Maurizio (2012). Mussolini's Navy: A Reference Guide to the Regina Marina 1930–45. Annapolis, Maryland: Naval Institute Press. ISBN 978-1-59114-544-8.
- Campbell, John (1985). Naval Weapons of World War Two. Annapolis, Maryland: Naval Institute Press. ISBN 0-87021-459-4.
- Fraccaroli, Aldo (1968). Italian Warships of World War II. Shepperton, UK: Ian Allan. ISBN 0-7110-0002-6.
- Roberts, John (1980). "Italy". In Chesneau, Roger (ed.). Conway's All the World's Fighting Ships 1922–1946. New York: Mayflower Books. pp. 280–317. ISBN 0-8317-0303-2.
- Rohwer, Jürgen; Hümmelchen, Gerhard (2005). Chronology of the War at Sea 1939–1945: The Naval History of World War Two (3rd rev. ed.). Annapolis, Maryland: Naval Institute Press. ISBN 1-59114-119-2.
- Whitley, M. J. (1988). Destroyers of World War 2: An International Encyclopedia. Annapolis, Maryland: Naval Institute Press. ISBN 1-85409-521-8.
