= Italian ship Baleno =

Baleno was the name of at least two ships of the Italian Navy and may refer to:

- Italian destroyer Baleno, a Folgore-class destroyer launched in 1931 and sunk in 1942.
- Italian patrol boat Baleno (P 492), a patrol boat launched in 1964 and retired in 1985.
