= Pietro De Cristofaro =

Italian naval officier (1900–1941)

- Born: 1 September 1900; Naples, Campania, Italy
- Died: 16 April 1941 (aged 40); Mediterranean Sea
- Military career
- Allegiance: Kingdom of Italy
- Branch: Regia Marina
- Service years: 1914–1941
- Rank: Capitano di Fregata (Commander)
- Commands: C.R.E.M. Detachment of Rome; Cortellazzo (torpedo boat); Luca Tarigo (destroyer)
- Conflicts: World War I; World War II; Battle of the Tarigo Convoy †
- Awards: Gold Medal of Military Valor (posthumous); Bronze Medal of Military Valor; War Cross for Military Valor

Pietro De Cristofaro (1 September 1900 – 16 April 1941) was an Italian naval officer during World War II.

== Biography ==
Pietro De Cristofaro was born in Naples in 1900 and entered the Italian Naval Academy in Livorno on 17 September 1914. He graduated in 1919 with the rank of ensign (during the First World War he was embarked on the cruiser Flavio Gioia, used as a training ship). He was promoted to sub-lieutenant on 17 March 1921 and to lieutenant three years later. After a series of assignments on various ships, on 27 August 1927 he was seriously injured in a plane crash near Fiume, while he was serving as an observer on a Savoia-Marchetti S.59 bis seaplane of the 188th Maritime Reconnaissance Squadron. After recovering from his wounds, from March 1928 to April 1929 he commanded the Rome Detachment of the C.R.E.M. (Corpo Regi Equipaggi Marittimi, Royal Naval Crews Corps).

From April 1929 to February 1931 De Cristofaro was an aide to the Prince of Piedmont; on 1 December 1932 he was promoted to lieutenant commander and given command of the destroyer Luca Tarigo and then of the torpedo boat Cortellazzo; he also served, for a short time, as executive officer on the destroyer Daniele Manin. He was assigned to the office of the Chief of Staff of the Navy from September 1935 to 1 June 1937, then he was sent to Tripoli and assigned to the High Command of the Armed Forces in North Africa. Back in Italy, he was executive officer of the light cruiser Luigi di Savoia Duca degli Abruzzi and then, in September 1939, he was attached to the Command of the 5th Air Squadron.

In November 1939 he was again given command of the destroyer Tarigo, of which he still was the commanding officer on 10 June 1940, when Italy entered World War II. In the first ten months of war, De Cristofaro with Tarigo carried out a number of convoy escort missions between Italy and Libya, as well as minelaying operations in the Strait of Sicily.

On 13 April 1941, Tarigo, along with the destroyers Lampo and Baleno, sailed from Naples to escort a Tripoli-bound convoy composed of the steamers Arta, Adana, Aegina, Iserlohn and Sabaudia (all German, except for the latter) with troops and supplies for the Afrika Korps. De Cristofaro was the escort leader. In the early hours of April 16, off the Kerkennah, the convoy was attacked by four British destroyers, led by Captain Philip Mack. Lampo and Baleno, taken by surprise, were disabled before they could mount an effective reaction; Tarigo, left alone, confronted the British ships and tried in vain to defend the merchant ships, but was in turn wrecked by enemy fire, which also amputated one of De Cristofaro's legs. Although already in a sinking condition, Tarigo managed to score two torpedo hits on the British destroyer Mohawk, sinking her. Shortly thereafter, Tarigo went down with most of the crew, including De Cristofaro. He was posthumously awarded the Gold Medal of Military Valor.

A Marina Militare corvette, in service from 1965 to 1992, has been named after him.
