= Lampo =

Lampo may refer to:

- Italian ship Lampo, the name of several Italian ships
- Lampo-class destroyer, a class of Italian warship
- Lampo (dog) (1950–1961), an Italian mixed-breed dog famous for his rail journeys
- Hubert Lampo (1920–2006), Flemish writer
- Léon Lampo (1923–1985), Belgian basketball player
- Pope Leo XI, also known as Papa Lampo
- Lampo, a character in 44 Cats

== See also ==
- Lampus
