= HMS Nubian (F36) =

Destroyer of the Royal Navy

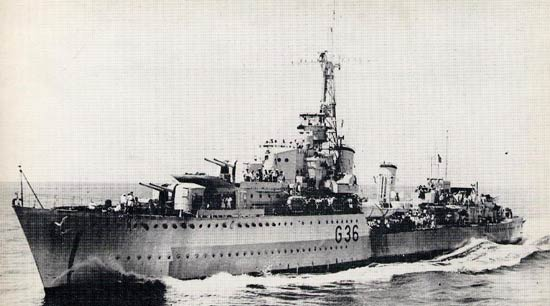
- Nubian, late in World War II

History

United Kingdom
- Name: Nubian
- Namesake: Nubians
- Ordered: 10 March 1936
- Builder: Thornycroft, Woolston, Southampton
- Cost: £339,265
- Laid down: 10 August 1936
- Launched: 21 December 1937
- Completed: 7 December 1937
- Commissioned: 1 December 1938
- Identification: Pennant numbers: L36, later F36
- Fate: Scrapped, 1949

General characteristics (as built)
- Class & type: Tribal-class destroyer
- Displacement: 1,891 long tons (1,921 t) (standard); 2,519 long tons (2,559 t) (deep load)
- Length: 377 ft (114.9 m) (o/a)
- Beam: 36 ft 6 in (11.13 m)
- Draught: 11 ft 3 in (3.43 m)
- Installed power: 3 × Admiralty 3-drum boilers; 44,000 shp (33,000 kW)
- Propulsion: 2 × shafts; 2 × geared steam turbines
- Speed: 36 knots (67 km/h; 41 mph)
- Range: 5,700 nmi (10,600 km; 6,600 mi) at 15 knots (28 km/h; 17 mph)
- Complement: 190
- Sensors & processing systems: ASDIC
- Armament: 4 × twin 4.7 in (120 mm) guns; 1 × quadruple 2-pdr (40 mm (1.6 in)) AA guns; 2 × quadruple 0.5 in (12.7 mm) anti-aircraft machineguns; 1 × quadruple 21 in (533 mm) torpedo tubes; 20 × depth charges, 1 × rack, 2 × throwers

HMS Nubian was a Tribal-class destroyer of the Royal Navy that saw much distinguished service in World War II. She won 13 battle honours, a record only exceeded by one other ship, and matched by two others.

== Description ==
The Tribals were intended to counter the large destroyers being built abroad and to improve the firepower of the existing destroyer flotillas and were thus significantly larger and more heavily armed than the preceding I class. The ships displaced 1,891 long tons (1,921 t) at standard load and 2,519 long tons (2,559 t) at deep load. They had an overall length of 377 feet (114.9 m), a beam of 36 feet 6 inches (11.13 m) and a draught of 11 feet 3 inches (3.43 m). The destroyers were powered by two Parsons geared steam turbines, each driving one propeller shaft using steam provided by three Admiralty three-drum boilers. The turbines developed a total of 44,000 shaft horsepower (33,000 kW) and gave a maximum speed of 36 knots (67 km/h; 41 mph). During her sea trials Nubian made 35.8 knots (66.3 km/h; 41.2 mph) from 44,426 shp (33,128 kW) at a displacement of 2,034 long tons (2,067 t). The ships carried enough fuel oil to give them a range of 5,700 nautical miles (10,600 km; 6,600 mi) at 15 knots (28 km/h; 17 mph). The ships' complement consisted of 190 officers and ratings, although the flotilla leaders carried an extra 20 officers and men consisting of the Captain (D) and his staff.

The primary armament of the Tribal-class destroyers was eight quick-firing (QF) 4.7-inch (120 mm) Mark XII guns in four superfiring twin-gun mounts, one pair each fore and aft of the superstructure, designated 'A', 'B', 'X', and 'Y' from front to rear. The mounts had a maximum elevation of 40°. For anti-aircraft (AA) defence, they carried a single quadruple mount for the 40-millimetre (1.6 in) QF two-pounder Mk II "pom-pom" gun and two quadruple mounts for the 0.5-inch (12.7 mm) Mark III machine gun. Low-angle fire for the main guns was controlled by the director-control tower (DCT) on the bridge roof that fed data acquired by it and the 12-foot (3.7 m) rangefinder on the Mk II Rangefinder/Director directly aft of the DCT to an analogue mechanical computer, the Mk I Admiralty Fire Control Clock. Anti-aircraft fire for the main guns was controlled by the Rangefinder/Director which sent data to the mechanical Fuze Keeping Clock.

The ships were fitted with a single above-water quadruple mount for 21-inch (533 mm) torpedoes. The Tribals were not intended as anti-submarine ships, but they were provided with ASDIC, one depth charge rack and two throwers for self-defence, although the throwers were not mounted in all ships; Twenty depth charges was the peacetime allotment, but this increased to 30 during wartime.

=== Wartime modifications ===
Heavy losses to German air attack during the Norwegian Campaign demonstrated the ineffectiveness of the Tribals' anti-aircraft suite and the RN decided in May 1940 to replace 'X' mount with two QF 4-inch (102 mm) Mark XVI dual-purpose guns in a twin-gun mount. To better control the guns, the existing rangefinder/director was modified to accept a Type 285 gunnery radar as they became available. The number of depth charges was increased to 46 early in the war, and still more were added later. To increase the firing arcs of the AA guns, the rear funnel was shortened and the mainmast was reduced to a short pole mast.

== Construction and career ==
Authorized as one of seven Tribal-class destroyers under the 1935 Naval Estimates, Nubian was the third ship of her name to serve in the Royal Navy. The ship was ordered on 10 March 1936 from John I. Thornycroft & Company and was laid down on 10 August at the company's Woolston, Southampton, shipyard. Launched on 21 December 1937, Nubian was completed on 7 December 1938 and commissioned on 1 December at a cost of £339,265 which excluded weapons and communications outfits furnished by the Admiralty. The ship's completion was delayed by the late delivery of her gunsights.

Nubian was in home waters for the early part of the Second World War, and saw action with the Home Fleet during the Norwegian Campaign in May 1940.

Following this, Nubian joined 14th Destroyer Flotilla at Plymouth, which was led by Captain P J Mack (temporarily flying his pennant in Janus, whilst has own ship, Jervis, was undergoing repair). Also in the 14th Destroyer Flotilla were Mohawk (another of the Tribal class), and Juno (another J-class destroyer). The flotilla left Plymouth for Alexandria on 18 May 1940, in company with 4 K-class destroyers from the 5th Destroyer Flotilla en route for service in the Red Sea; they arrived in Alexandria on 25 May, just two weeks days before hostilities with Italy commenced on 11 June 1940.

Nubian saw much action, being involved in the actions at Calabria, in July 1940, Matapan (March 1941), Sfax (April), and finally Crete (May). During the battle of Cape Matapan, she delivered the coup de grace to the Italian cruiser Pola, stricken by an aerial torpedo.

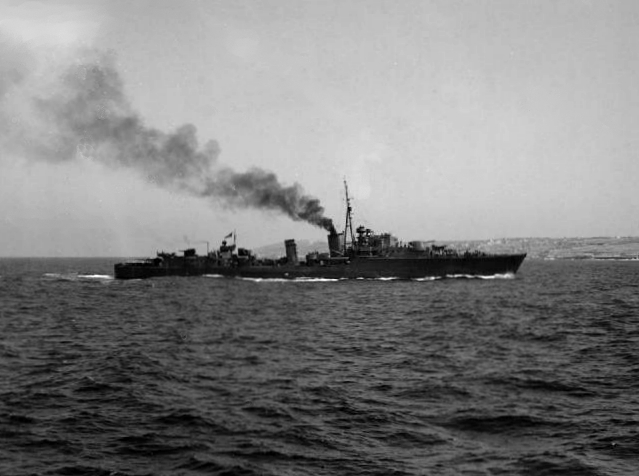
Nubian off Malta, 1943

During the battle of Crete, on 26 May, Nubian was bombed and had her stern blown off, with the loss of 7 of her crew killed, and another 12 wounded. Despite further attacks, she was able to return to Alexandria under escort, but departed there on 12 June under tow for extensive repairs in Bombay, which were not completed for another 18 months.

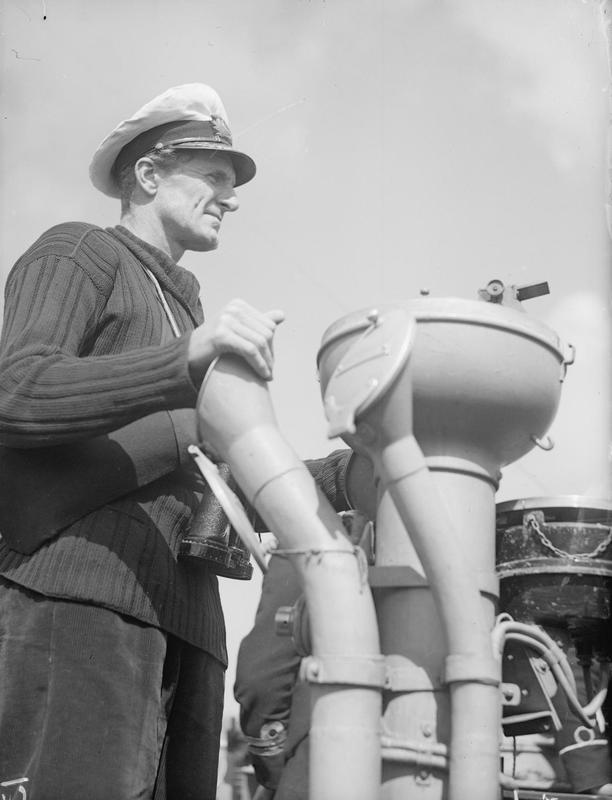
Commander Deric Holland-Martin on the bridge of the Nubian off the coast of Malta in 1943

Nubian returned to the Mediterranean and the 14th Destroyer Flotilla in November 1942, seeing action with them against the Italian torpedo boat Lupo convoy on 2 December and off Tripoli in company with Jervis on 20–21 December.

From January to May 1943 she participate in the Tunisian campaign, where Nubian along with other British destroyers sank the merchants D'Annunzio, Stromboli, Fauna and Campobasso. On 9 February, Nubian and Kelvin engaged three Italian schooners near the island of Kuriat, off Monastir, but the small vessels managed to sail away unscathed by throwing blazing drums of fuel to the sea which then became the target of the British guns. The warship was also involved with supporting the landings in Sicily, and at Salerno, before returning to Britain for reassignment to the Arctic. While in the Arctic she conducted convoy escort duty, during which she was involved in at least one direct attack on a U-boat, a cat and mouse hunt which lasted some days. She also tracked at least 11 other U-boats that twice attacked the convoy she was shadowing. During operations conducted in the Arctic, she dispatched back to Norway on two vital operations. These were a strike on the German submarine base at Trondheim Fjord, and a strike on the German battleship Tirpitz at Alton Fjord.

At the end of 1944, Nubian was refitted, ready to be dispatched to the Far East in March 1945 as part of the escort force of the 21st Aircraft Carrier Squadron, seeing action in support of the closing operations in Burma.

== Battle honours ==
- Norway 1940
- Calabria 1940
- Mediterranean 1940–43
- Libya 1940
- Matapan 1941
- Sfax 1941
- Greece 1941
- Crete 1941
- Malta Convoys 1941
- Sicily 1943
- Salerno 1943
- Arctic 1944
- Norway 1944
- Burma 1944-45

Two other ships, Orion and Jervis, also serving in the Mediterranean with Nubian, matched this record; it was exceeded only by the Queen Elizabeth-class battleship Warspite, a Jutland veteran and the Mediterranean Fleet flagship through much of the Second World War.
