= Italian ship Lampo =

Lampo was the name of at least three Italian ships, and may refer to:

- Italian destroyer Lampo (1899), a Lampo-class destroyer launched in 1899 and discarded in 1920.
- Italian destroyer Lampo (1931), a Folgore-class destroyer, launched in 1931 and sunk in 1943.
- Italian patrol boat Lampo (P 491), a patrol boat launched in 1960 and retired in 1985.
