= Result (schooner) =

Three-masted cargo schooner built in Carrickfergus in 1893

Coordinates: 54°39′21.07″N 5°48′20.58″W

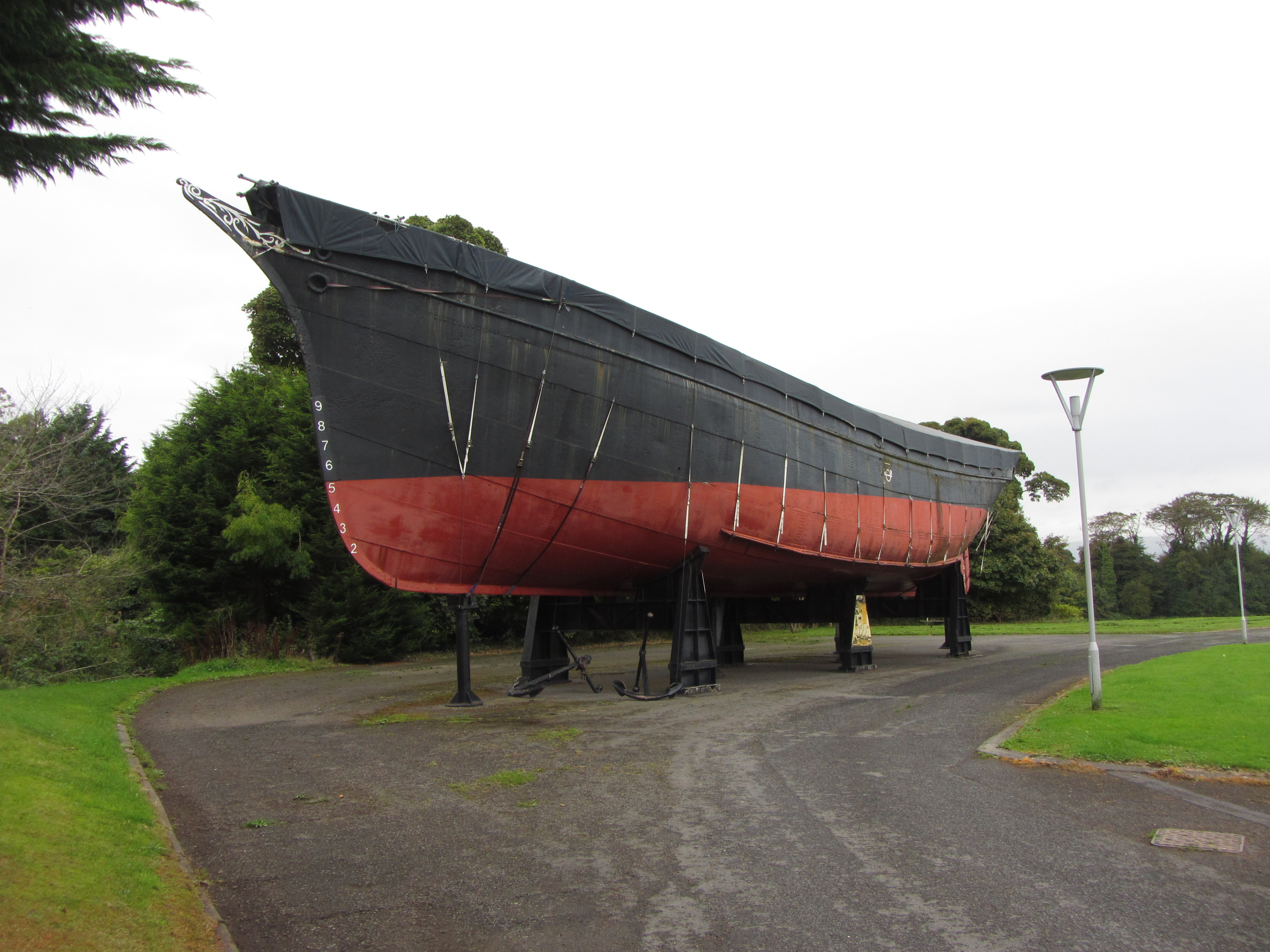
- Result at the Ulster Folk and Transport Museum

History

United Kingdom
- Name: Result
- Owner: Thomas Ashburner & Co. (1893-1909); Capts. Henry Clarke, Tom Welch & Peter Welch (1909-1967)
- Port of registry: Barrow (1893-1914); Barnstaple (1914-1967)
- Builder: Paul Rodgers & Co. and Robert Kent & Co., Carrickfergus, Northern Ireland
- Yard number: 39
- Laid down: 1892
- Launched: 6 January 1893
- In service: 1893
- Out of service: 1967
- Identification: Official number: 99937
- Fate: Sold to the Ulster Folk and Transport Museum, 1970
- Status: Museum ship

United Kingdom
- Name: HMS Result (Q23)
- Acquired: by requisition, January 1917
- Commissioned: February 1917
- Decommissioned: July 1917
- Fate: Returned to owners, August 1917

General characteristics
- Type: Cargo schooner / Q-ship
- Tonnage: 122 GRT; 88 NRT
- Length: 102 ft (31 m) o/a
- Beam: 21 ft 8 in (6.60 m)
- Depth: 7 ft 6 in (2.29 m)
- Propulsion: 1 × 45 bhp (34 kW) single cylinder Kromhaut engine (from 1914); 1 × 120 bhp (89 kW) engine (from 1946)
- Complement: 23 (in RN service)
- Armament: (in RN service); 2 × QF 12 pounder 18 cwt naval guns; 1 × 6-pounder gun; 2 × fixed 14 in (360 mm) torpedo tubes; Depth charges

Result is a three-masted cargo schooner built in Carrickfergus in 1893. She was a working ship until 1967, and served for a short time in the Royal Navy as a Q-ship during World War I. She currently rests on land at the Ulster Folk and Transport Museum, and in 1996 was added to the National Register of Historic Vessels.

== Ship history ==
The ship was ordered from the Paul Rodgers & Co. yard in Carrickfergus, Northern Ireland, by the shipping company Thomas Ashburner & Co., based in Barrow. The ship was laid down in early 1892, but financial problems forced Rodgers to sell his yard to Robert Kent & Co. of Ayr, before she was complete, and Kent & Co. finally launched the ship in January 1893. The design was a collaboration between Paul Rodgers, Richard Ashburner and Capt. Robert Wright, and in consequence she was named the "Result".

Result was operated by the Ashburner company until 1909, when she was sold for £1,100 to Capt. Henry Clarke of Braunton, North Devon. In March 1914 a 45 bhp single-cylinder Kromhout auxiliary engine was fitted.

In January 1917 Result was requisitioned by the Royal Navy to act as a Q-ship with the pennant number Q23. She was armed with two 12-pounder guns forward and aft of the mainmast, a 6-pounder gun forward, and two fixed 14-inch torpedo tubes aft. The crew of 23 were commanded by Lieutenant Philip Mack RN, and the second-in-command was Lt. George Muhlhauser RNR.

The usual procedure for U-boats attacking small merchant ships was to surface and fire a warning shot, then allow the crew to abandon ship before closing and sinking it with shellfire from her deck gun. The Q-ships would simulate the abandoning of the ship by a small "panic party", and allow the U-boat to approach before raising the White Ensign and opening fire with her concealed weapons.

On 15 March 1917, Result was on her first patrol, sailing off the south end of the Dogger Bank, under the flag of the neutral Netherlands, when she spotted the German submarine UC-45 on the surface astern about two miles off. The UC-45 approached to 2,000 yards before opening fire. The "panic party" of five men rowed away in a small boat, leaving the seemingly abandoned vessel to the Germans. However the submarine, wary of deception, closed to no more 1,000 yards, keeping up a steady and rather inaccurate fire. Result sustained some damage to her sails and rigging, and eventually Mack gave the order to attack, and the aft 12-pounder hit the submarine in the conning tower with its first shot. The 6-pounder also hit the submarine, but it then dived, and the 12-pounders second shot missed. Result then headed for the English coast, but that night encountered another German U-boat. Result fired a torpedo, which missed, and both vessels opened fire, to little effect, before the submarine dived. For his actions Lt. Mack received a mention in despatches.

On her next patrol Result was disguised as a Swedish vessel under the name Dag. At 4 a.m. on 5 April she spotted a U-boat on the surface near the Noord Hinder Light off Vlissingen. The submarine dived and circled the Result, who were unaware that they were being photographed. The submarine eventually resurfaced at about 6,000 yards and opened fire with her 100 mm (4 in) gun. A shell hit Result amidships, setting fire to the magazine and injuring two men. Result returned fire, but the submarine dived without being hit. She then began to shadow the Result, and Mack, fearing an attack by torpedo, dropped a depth charge. The submarine finally fled after several small naval craft approached.

Result had no further success in attracting submarines, and it was not until several months later that the Navy learned that she had been photographed and identified as a decoy by the Germans. In July 1917 the crew of Result were transferred to another Q-ship, and as the Navy could find no other use for her she was returned to her owners in August 1917.

After the war Result was employed transporting Welsh slate, sailing from Portmadoc to Antwerp and other ports, and then along the south coast of England. For most of this time she was jointly owned by Capt. Clarke and Capt. Tom Welch, also of Braunton, but shortly before the outbreak of World War II sole ownership passed to Capt. Welch. During the war she was employed in the Bristol Channel, transporting coal from ports in south Wales.

In 1946 she was refitted with a new 120 hp engine. In 1950 she was hired to take part in the filming of Outcast of the Islands, directed by Carol Reed, and starring Trevor Howard and Ralph Richardson. She was refitted for her part at Appledore, and filming took place around the Scilly Isles.

Result returned to her previous trade in January 1951 and, under the ownership of Capt. Peter Welch, was employed up until 1967, by which time she was the last vessel of her type still in operation. She was at Jersey being converted into a charter yacht when Capt. Welch died, and was laid up at Exeter before eventually being sold by Mrs. Welch to the Ulster Folk and Transport Museum. Result sailed to Belfast in late 1970 for some restoration work at the Harland & Wolff shipyard. In 1979 she was transported to the museum's site at Cultra where she remains on display.

== See also ==
- Mary B Mitchell
