= Battle of Cape Matapan =

1941 Allied naval victory over Italy

- Part of the Battle of the Mediterranean
- Map of the battle
| Date | 27–29 March 1941 |
| Location | Off Cape Matapan, Mediterranean Sea 35°21′00″N 22°00′00″E |
| Result | Allied victory |

Belligerents
| United Kingdom; Australia | Italy |

Commanders and leaders
| Andrew Cunningham | Angelo Iachino |

Strength
| 1 aircraft carrier 3 battleships 7 light cruisers 17 destroyers | 1 battleship 6 heavy cruisers 2 light cruisers 13 destroyers |

Casualties and losses
| 3 killed 1 aircraft destroyed | 2,331 killed 1,015 captured 3 heavy cruisers sunk 2 destroyers sunk |
- Location within Mediterranean

The Battle of Cape Matapan (Greek: Ναυμαχία του Ταινάρου) was a naval battle during the Second World War between the Allies, represented by the navies of the United Kingdom and Australia, and the Royal Italian Navy, from 27 to 29 March 1941. Cape Matapan is on the south-western coast of the Peloponnesian peninsula of Greece.

After the interception and decryption of Italian signals by the Government Code and Cypher School (GC&CS) at Bletchley Park (the decrypted intelligence codenamed Ultra), ships of the Royal Navy and Royal Australian Navy, under the command of Admiral Sir Andrew Cunningham, intercepted and sank or severely damaged several ships of the Italian Regia Marina under Squadron Vice-Admiral Angelo Iachino. The opening actions of the battle are also known in Italy as the Battle of Gaudo.

== Background ==
In late March 1941, as British ships of the Mediterranean Fleet covered troop movements to Greece, Mavis Batey, a cryptanalyst at Bletchley Park, made a breakthrough, reading the Italian naval Enigma for the first time. The first message, the cryptic "Today’s the day minus three," was followed three days later by a second message reporting the sailing of an Italian battle fleet comprising one battleship, six heavy and two light cruisers, plus destroyers to attack the merchant convoys supplying British forces. As always with Enigma, the intelligence breakthrough was concealed from the Italians by ensuring there was a plausible, visible reason for the Allies to have detected and intercepted their fleet. In this case, it was a carefully directed reconnaissance plane.

As a further deception, Admiral Cunningham made a surreptitious exit after dark from a golf club in Alexandria to avoid being seen boarding his flagship, the battleship HMS Warspite. He had made a point of arriving at the club the same afternoon with his suitcase as if for an overnight stay, and spent some time on the golf course within sight of the Japanese consul. An evening party on his flagship was advertised for that night but was never meant to take place.

At the same time, there was a failure of intelligence on the Axis side. The Italians had been incorrectly informed by the Germans that the British Mediterranean Fleet had only one operational battleship and no aircraft carriers. In fact the Royal Navy had three battleships, while the damaged British aircraft carrier Illustrious had been replaced by HMS Formidable.

== Prelude ==
=== Opposing forces ===
The Allied force was the British Mediterranean fleet, consisting of the aircraft carrier HMS Formidable and three Queen Elizabeth-class battleships, Barham, Valiant, and Warspite. The main fleet was accompanied by the 10th Destroyer Flotilla (HMS Greyhound and Griffin, and HMAS Stuart, commanded by Commander "Hec" Waller, RAN), and the 14th Destroyer Flotilla (HMS Jervis, Janus, Mohawk, and Nubian, commanded by Philip Mack); also present were HMS Hotspur and Havock. Force B, under Admiral Sir Henry Pridham-Wippell, Vice-Admiral Commanding, Light Forces and Second-in-Command Mediterranean Fleet, consisted of the British light cruisers HMS Ajax, Gloucester, and Orion, the Australian light cruiser HMAS Perth, and the British destroyers HMS Hasty, Hereward, and Ilex. The Australian HMAS Vendetta had returned to Alexandria. Allied warships attached to convoys were available: HMS Defender, Jaguar, and Juno waited in the Kithira Channel and HMS Decoy, Carlisle, Calcutta, and Bonaventure and HMAS Vampire were nearby.

The Italian fleet was led by Admiral Iachino's flagship, the modern battleship Vittorio Veneto, screened by destroyers Alpino, Bersagliere, Fuciliere, and Granatiere of the 13th Flotilla. The fleet also included most of the Italian heavy cruiser force: Zara, Fiume, and Pola, accompanied by four destroyers (Alfredo Oriani, Giosuè Carducci, Vincenzo Gioberti, and Vittorio Alfieri) of the 9th Flotilla; and the heavy cruisers Trieste, Trento, and Bolzano, accompanied by three destroyers (Ascari, Corazziere, and Carabiniere) of the 12th Flotilla. Joining them were the light cruisers Luigi di Savoia Duca degli Abruzzi and Giuseppe Garibaldi (8th division) and two destroyers of the 16th Flotilla (Emanuele Pessagno and Nicoloso da Recco) from Brindisi.

== Battle ==
On 27 March, Vice-Admiral Pridham-Wippell—with the cruisers Ajax, Gloucester, Orion and Perth and a number of destroyers—sailed from Greek waters for a position south of Crete. Admiral Cunningham with Formidable, Warspite, Barham and Valiant left Alexandria on the same day to meet the cruisers.

The Italian fleet was spotted by a Sunderland flying boat at 12:00, depriving Iachino of any advantage of surprise. The Italian admiral also learned that Formidable was at sea, thanks to the decryption team aboard Vittorio Veneto. Nevertheless, after some discussion, the Italian headquarters decided to go ahead with the operation, to show the Germans their will to fight and confidence in the higher speed of their warships.

=== Action off Gavdos ===
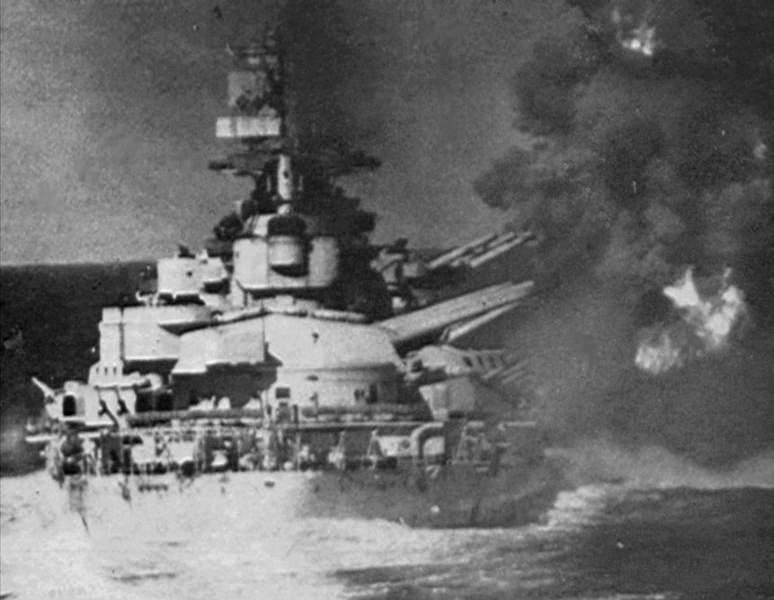
The battleship Vittorio Veneto firing upon the Allied cruisers during the action off Gavdos

On 28 March, an IMAM Ro.43 floatplane launched by Vittorio Veneto spotted the British cruiser squadron at 06:35. At 07:55, the Trento group encountered Admiral Pridham-Wippell's cruiser group south of the Greek island of Gavdos. The British squadron was heading to the south-east. Thinking they were attempting to run from their larger ships, the Italians gave chase, opening fire at 08:12 from 24,000 yd (22,000 m). The three heavy cruisers fired repeatedly until 08:55, with Trieste firing 132 armour-piercing rounds, Trento firing 204 armour-piercing and 10 explosive shells and Bolzano firing another 189 armour piercing shells, but the Italians experienced trouble with their rangefinding equipment and scored no significant hits. HMS Gloucester fired three salvos in return. These fell short but did cause the Italians to make a course change.

As they had not reduced the distance significantly after an hour of pursuit, the Italian cruisers broke off the chase, turning to the north-west on a course to rejoin Vittorio Veneto. The Allied ships changed course in turn, following the Italian cruisers at extreme range. Iachino allowed the British approach in the hope of luring them within the range of Vittorio Veneto's guns.

An officer on Orion's bridge remarked to a companion, "What's that battleship over there? I thought ours were miles away." The Italians eavesdropped on Orion's signal that she had sighted an unknown unit and was going to investigate. At 10:55, Vittorio Veneto joined the Italian cruisers and immediately opened fire on the shadowing Allied cruisers. She fired 94 rounds in 29 salvos from a distance of 25,000 yd (23,000 m), all well aimed, but again with an excessive dispersal of her salvos. (Another 11 rounds got jammed in the barrels.) The Allied cruisers, until then unaware of the presence of a battleship, withdrew, suffering slight damage from 381 mm (15.0 in) shell fragments. A series of photographs taken from HMS Gloucester showing Italian salvos falling amongst Allied warships was published by Life magazine on 16 June 1941.

=== Air attacks ===
Vittorio Veneto withdraws from the battle area after being torpedoed by RN aircraft.

Cunningham's force, which had been attempting to rendezvous with Pridham-Wippell, launched an attack with Fairey Albacore torpedo bombers from HMS Formidable at 09:38. They attacked Vittorio Veneto without direct effect, but the required manoeuvring made it difficult for the Italian ships to maintain their pursuit. The Italian ships fired 152, 100 and 90 mm guns and also 37, 20 and 13.2 mm guns when at close range, repelling the attack, while one of the two Junkers Ju 88s escorting the Italian fleet was shot down by a Fairey Fulmar. Iachino broke off the pursuit at 12:20, retiring towards his own air cover at Taranto.

A second aerial attack at 15:09 surprised the Italians; Lieutenant-Commander John Dalyell-Stead (DSO) was able to fly his Albacore to within 1,000m of Vittorio Veneto before releasing a torpedo which hit her outer port propeller and caused 4,000 long tons (4,100 t) of flooding. Dalyell-Stead and his crew were killed when their aircraft was shot down by anti-aircraft fire from the battleship. The ship stopped while the damage was repaired, but she was able to get under way again at 16:42, making 19 knots (35 km/h; 22 mph). Cunningham heard of the damage to Vittorio Veneto, and started a pursuit.

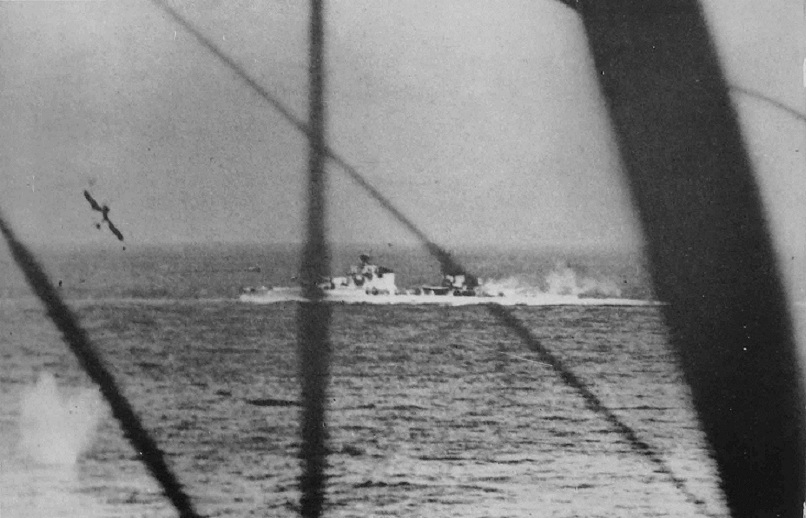
Bolzano under torpedo attack by Fairey Swordfish.

A third attack by six Albacores and two Fairey Swordfish of 826 and 828 Naval Air Squadrons from Formidable and two Swordfish of 815 squadron from Crete took place between 19:36 and 19:50. Admiral Iachino deployed his ships in three columns and used smoke, searchlights, and a heavy barrage to protect Vittorio Veneto. The tactics prevented further damage to the battleship, but one torpedo hit Pola, which had nearly stopped to avoid running into Fiume and could not take any evasive action. This blow knocked out five boilers and the main steam line, causing Pola to lose electric power and drift to a stop. The torpedo was apparently dropped by Lieutenant Grainger Williams. Williams was subsequently awarded the Distinguished Service Cross, primarily for the part he played in bringing about the ensuing naval engagement.

Unaware of Cunningham's pursuit, a squadron of cruisers and destroyers was ordered to return and help Pola. This squadron included Pola's sister ships, Zara and Fiume. The squadron did not start to return towards Pola until about an hour after the order had been given by Iachino, officially due to communication problems, while Vittorio Veneto and the other ships continued to Taranto.

=== Night action ===
At 20:15, Orion's radar picked up a ship six miles to port, apparently dead in the water; she was the crippled Pola. The bulk of the Allied forces detected the Italian squadron on radar shortly after 22:00, and were able to close without being detected. The Italian ships had no radar and could not detect British ships by means other than sight; Italian thinking did not envisage night actions and their main gun batteries were not prepared for action. At 22:20 they spotted the Allied squadron, but thought them to be Italian ships. The battleships Barham, Valiant, and Warspite were able to close to 3,800 yards (3,500 m) – point blank range for battleship guns – at which point they opened fire. The Allied searchlights (including those under the command of Midshipman Prince Philip of Greece and Denmark aboard Valiant) illuminated their enemy. The aircraft carrier Formidable also joined the main battleline, although only fired 1 salvo from her 4.5 inch guns before pulling back to safety. Some British gunners saw main turrets flying dozens of metres into the air from the Italian cruisers. Fiume and Zara were destroyed in minutes. Fiume sank at 23:30, while Zara was finished off by a torpedo from the destroyer HMS Jervis at 02:40 of 29 March.

Two Italian destroyers, Vittorio Alfieri (flagship of the flotilla commander, Captain Salvatore Toscano) and Giosuè Carducci, were sunk in the first five minutes. The other two, Gioberti and Oriani, managed to escape in a smoke screen, the former with heavy damage, after being chased and fired at by the British destroyers Griffin and Greyhound. Towing Pola to Alexandria as a prize was considered, but daylight was approaching, and it was thought that the danger of enemy air attack was too high. British boarding parties seized a number of much-needed Breda anti-aircraft machine guns. Pola's crew was taken off and she was sunk by torpedoes from the destroyers Jervis and Nubian shortly after 04:00. The only known Italian reaction after the shocking surprise was a fruitless torpedo charge by Oriani and Gioberti and the aimless fire of one of Zara's 40 mm guns in the direction of the British warships.

The Allied ships took on survivors but left the scene in the morning, fearing Axis air strikes. Admiral Cunningham ordered a signal to be made on the Merchant Marine emergency band. This signal was received by the Italian High Command. It informed them that, due to the risk of air strikes, the Allied ships had ceased their rescue operations and granted safe passage to a hospital ship for rescue purposes. The location of the remaining survivors was broadcast, and the Italian hospital ship Gradisca came to recover them. Allied casualties during the battle were a single torpedo bomber shot down by Vittorio Veneto's 90 mm (3.5-inch) anti-aircraft batteries, with the loss of the three-man crew. Italian losses were up to 2,303 sailors, most of them from Zara and Fiume. The Allies rescued 1,015 survivors, while the Italians saved another 160.

== Aftermath ==
=== Balance of naval power ===
The naval historian Vincent O'Hara described the Battle of Matapan as "Italy's greatest defeat at sea, subtracting from its order of battle a cruiser division, but the battle was hardly decisive." The British in the Mediterranean lost the heavy cruiser York and the new light cruiser Bonaventure in the same period (26–31 March 1941), but while the Royal Navy lost four heavy cruisers during the war (York, Exeter, Cornwall and Dorsetshire, the latter two in a single engagement), at Matapan the Regia Marina lost three in a night. That the Italians had sortied so far to the east established a potential threat that forced the British to keep their battleships ready to face another sortie during the operations off Greece and Crete.

After the defeat at Cape Matapan, the Italian Admiral Iachino wrote that the battle had

... the consequence of limiting for some time our operational activities, not for the serious moral effect of the losses, as the British believed, but because the operation revealed our inferiority in effective aero-naval cooperation and the backwardness of our night battle technology.

— Iachino

The Italian fleet did not venture into the Eastern Mediterranean again until the fall of Crete two months later and it did not come out in full force until the Battle of mid-June 1942. Despite his impressive victory, Admiral Cunningham was somewhat disappointed with the failure of the destroyers to make contact with Vittorio Veneto. The fact that the Italian battleship had escaped intact was, in the words of the British admiral, "much to be regretted".

=== Bletchley Park (GC&CS) ===
For reasons of secrecy, code breakers at the GC&CS were very rarely informed of the operational effects of their work, but their impact on the Battle of Cape Matapan was an exception. A few weeks after the battle, Admiral Cunningham visited Bletchley Park to congratulate the codebreaker Dilly Knox and his staff, with a positive impact on morale: Mavis Batey, one of the code breakers, remembers: "Our sense of elation knew no bounds when Cunningham himself came down in person to thank and congratulate us". Admiral John Godfrey, the Director of Naval Intelligence, stated: "Tell Dilly that we have won a great victory in the Mediterranean and it is entirely due to his girls".

=== Post war ===
There is still controversy in Italy regarding the orders given by the Italian Admiral Angelo Iachino to the Zara division to recover the Pola, when it was clear that an enemy battleship force was approaching rapidly from the opposite direction.

When Cunningham won at Matapan

By the grace of God and Dilly

He was the brains behind them all

And should ne'er be forgotten. Will he?

— [W.F. Clarke on Dilly Knox]

For decades after the end of the Second World War, the involvement of the GC&CS, as well as the code-breaking methods used, were kept secret. A number of controversial theories were published before more complete accounts emerged after records were eventually declassified in 1978. Only later, after Dilly's rodding method was demonstrated by Mavis Batey to the Admiral in charge of naval history, were Italian official records corrected. In 1966, H. Montgomery Hyde published a story alleging that an American spy, Betty Thorpe, had seduced Admiral Alberto Lais (the Italian naval attaché in Washington, D.C.), and that she had obtained a codebook used by the British to defeat the Italians at Matapan. Hyde was found guilty of libelling the dead, but evidence of GC&CS involvement was not made public at that time. In 1980, the BBC series Spy! included similar allegations about a spy called 'Cynthia' who obtained a codebook. In 1974, Frederick Winterbotham in The Ultra Secret falsely credited the decryption of Luftwaffe Enigma traffic.

== Order of battle ==
=== Italy ===

- Ammiraglio di squadra Angelo Iachino
  - One battleship: Vittorio Veneto (damaged)
  - Four destroyers (13a Squadriglia Cacciatorpediniere): Alpino, Bersagliere, Fuciliere, Granatiere
- Ammiraglio di divisione Antonio Legnani
  - Two light cruisers (8a Divisione Incrociatori): Duca degli Abruzzi, Giuseppe Garibaldi
  - Two destroyers (16a Squadriglia Cacciatorpediniere): Emanuele Pessagno, Nicoloso da Recco
- Ammiraglio di divisione Luigi Sansonetti
  - Three heavy cruisers (3a Divisione Incrociatori): Bolzano, Trento, Trieste
  - Three destroyers (12a Squadriglia Cacciatorpediniere): Ascari, Carabiniere, Corazziere
- Ammiraglio di divisione Carlo Cattaneo
  - Three heavy cruisers (1a Divisione Incrociatori): Fiume (sunk), Pola (sunk), Zara (sunk)
  - Four destroyers (9a Squadriglia Cacciatorpediniere): Vittorio Alfieri (sunk), Giosuè Carducci (sunk), Vincenzo Gioberti (damaged), Alfredo Oriani

=== Allies ===
Included: Force A, 14th Destroyer Flotilla, 10th Destroyer Flotilla (of Force C), Force B, 2nd Destroyer Flotilla, Force D

- Admiral Sir Andrew Cunningham
  - Three battleships: HMS Barham, Valiant, and Warspite
  - One aircraft carrier: HMS Formidable (1 aircraft lost, 3 dead)
  - Nine destroyers: HMS Greyhound, Griffin, Jervis, Janus, Mohawk, Nubian, Hotspur and Havock and HMAS Stuart
- Vice-Admiral Henry Pridham-Wippell
  - Four light cruisers: HMS Ajax, Gloucester and Orion and HMAS Perth
  - Three destroyers: HMS Hasty, Hereward and Ilex
- AG 9 convoy (from Alexandria to Greece)
  - Two light cruisers: HMS Calcutta and Carlisle
  - Three destroyers: HMS Defender, Jaguar and HMAS Vampire
- GA 8 convoy (from Greece to Alexandria)
  - One anti-aircraft cruiser: HMS Bonaventure
  - Two destroyers: HMS Decoy and Juno
  - One merchant ship: Thermopylæ (Norwegian)
