= Philip Mack =

Royal Navy admiral

Rear-Admiral Philip Mack DSO*
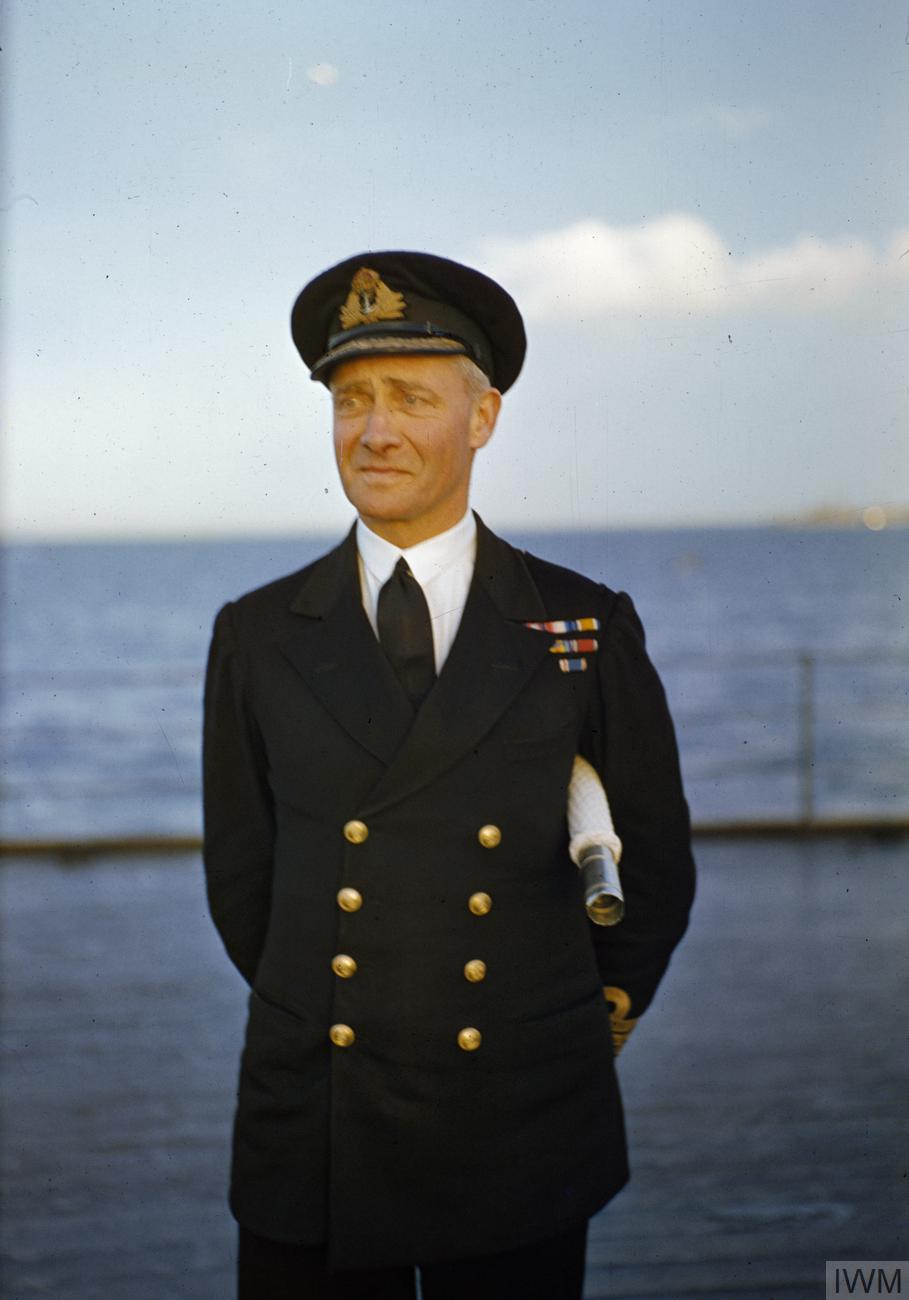
- Mack onboard HMS King George V in 1942
- Born: 6 October 1892; Paston Hall, Paston, Norfolk
- Died: 29 April 1943 (aged 50)
- Burial place: Saint Margaret's church, Paston, Norfolk
- Military career
- Allegiance: United Kingdom
- Branch: Royal Navy
- Service years: 1905–1943
- Rank: Rear-Admiral
- Commands: HMS Result; HMS Tay and Tyne; HMS Tumult; HMS Wishart; HMS Wryneck; HMS Jervis; HMS Janus; 7th Destroyer Flotilla; 14th Destroyer Flotilla; HMS King George V
- Conflicts: World War I; World War II; Mediterranean and Middle East theatre; Mediterranean War; Battle of Cape Matapan; Battle of the Tarigo Convoy
- Awards: Distinguished Service Order & bar; Mention in Despatches (1917 & 1942)

Rear-Admiral Philip John Mack DSO* (6 October 1892 – 29 April 1943) was an officer of the British Royal Navy.

== Biography ==
He was the eldest son of Major Philip Paston Mack (1854–1923) of the 12th Lancers, and Kate Lucy Pearce (1869–1955), of Paston Hall, Paston, Norfolk.

Mack joined the Navy on 15 September 1905, aged 13, as a naval cadet at the Osborne and Britannia Royal Naval Colleges. On 9 August 1910 he was posted to the battlecruiser Indomitable as a midshipman, transferring to the cruiser Amethyst on 15 July 1913, having been promoted to sub-lieutenant on 15 June.

Mack was promoted to lieutenant on 15 September 1914, and subsequently served during World War I aboard the torpedo-boat destroyer Tigress, the battleship Lord Nelson, and the former collier River Clyde, which had been requisitioned and refitted for use as a landing ship during the Gallipoli campaign from April 1915, and from which Mack was eventually invalided home. From January to April 1917 he commanded the Q-ship Result (Q 23), a 122-ton three-masted steel-hulled topsail schooner, in which he engaged and damaged the U-boat UC-45 on 15 February, and on 4 April engaged another U-boat near the Noord Hinder lightvessel off Vlissingen. Result was seriously damaged by gunfire from the submarine, and was eventually returned to her owners in August. Mack subsequently received a Mention in Despatches on 21 April 1917. He then commanded another Q-ship, the former cargo ship Tay and Tyne, later the RFA Industry.

Mack was promoted to lieutenant commander on 15 September 1922, and from late 1923 commanded the S-class destroyer Tumult, and then from October 1923 until early 1925 the destroyer Wishart in the Mediterranean Fleet. From December 1925 until mid-1927 he was the executive officer of the heavy cruiser Hawkins on the China Station, receiving promotion to commander on 30 June 1927. Between 9 April 1928 and 1 May 1930 he was the commander of the destroyer Wryneck and a Divisional Commander in the 1st Destroyer Flotilla of the Mediterranean Fleet. From July 1930 he served on the staff of the Operations Division at the Admiralty, returning to sea in July 1932 to serve as executive officer of the battleship Nelson in the Home Fleet until promoted to the rank of captain on 31 December 1934. After completing the Senior Officers' War Course at the War College at Greenwich, he was appointed a naval attaché at Buenos Aires in December 1935, remaining there until November 1938.

=== World War II ===
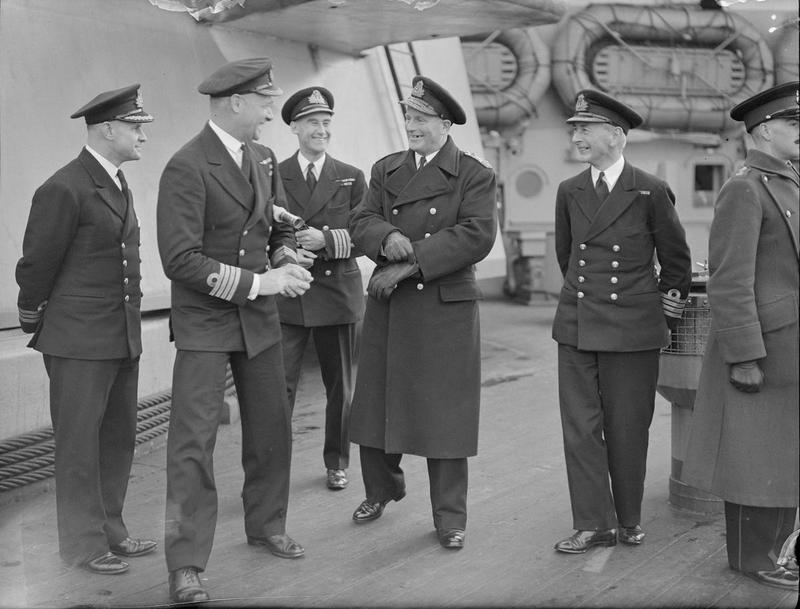
Rear Admiral I G Glennie, who relieved Rear Admiral R L Burnett in Command of Home Fleet destroyers, shown with officers of the Fleet Flagship, HMS KING GEORGE V, after calling in on the C-in-C Home Fleet. Left to right: Commander E F H C Rutherford, RN; Captain P J Mack, DSO, RN; Captain A E M B Cunningham-Grahm, RN; Rear Admiral I G Glennie; Captain F B Lloyd, OBE, RN.

Mack returned to England and on 20 March 1939 was appointed Captain (D) of the 7th Destroyer Flotilla of the Home Fleet, in the destroyer Jervis. For brief period between April and June 1940 he commanded Janus, while Jervis was under repair at the Swan Hunter yard in Newcastle, after a collision with the Swedish ship SS Tor near Longstone Lighthouse.

Mack then returned to Jervis, to serve as Captain (D) of the 14th Destroyer Flotilla in the Mediterranean Fleet, and was awarded the Distinguished Service Order on 11 July 1940. After leading his flotilla in the Battle of the Tarigo Convoy on 16 April 1941 he received a bar to his DSO on 1 August 1941, and for his part in the Battle of Cape Matapan in late March 1941 he received a second Mention in Despatches on 3 February 1942.

On 6 May 1942 he was appointed commander of the battleship King George V, and was promoted to rear admiral on 12 January 1943. Rear-Admiral Mack was killed in an air crash on 29 April 1943 and is buried in St. Margaret Churchyard, Paston.

== Personal life ==
In 1930 he married Elizabeth Dawson, daughter of Cecil Percy Dawson, of Shanghai, China.

His younger brothers Commander Richard Herbert Mack OBE (1896–1967) and Commander Edward Mack DSO DSC (1909–1985) also served in the Royal Navy during World War II.
