= HMS Jervis =

J-class destroyer

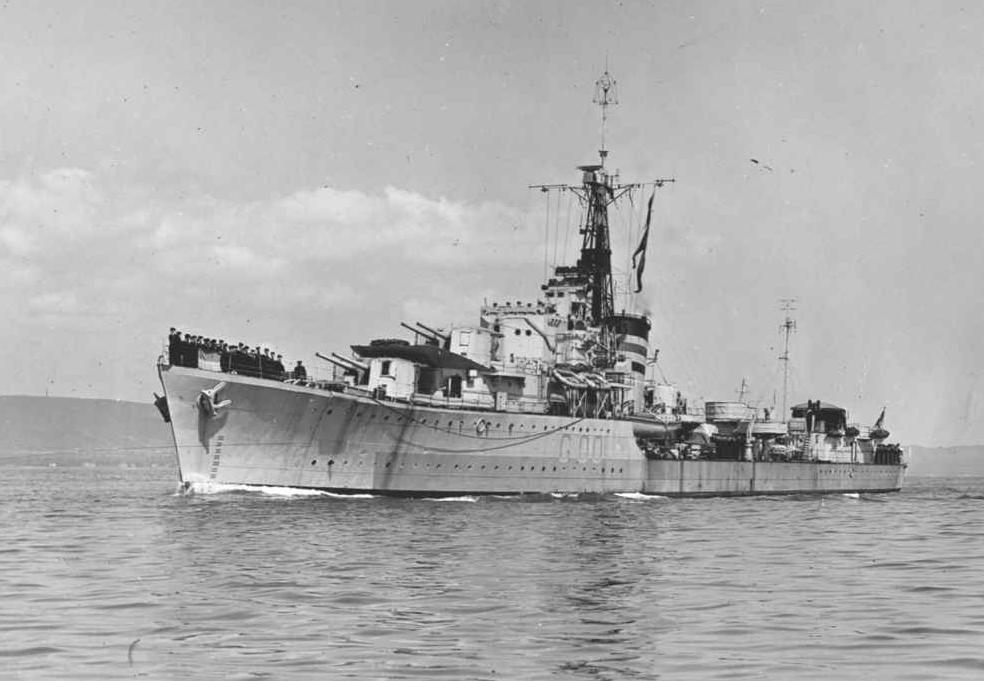
- Jervis in 1945

History

United Kingdom
- Name: Jervis
- Namesake: Admiral John Jervis
- Builder: Hawthorn Leslie and Company
- Laid down: 26 August 1937
- Launched: 9 September 1938
- Commissioned: 8 May 1939
- Decommissioned: May 1946
- Identification: Pennant number: F00 (1937–1940); G00 (1940–1946)
- Honours and awards: 13 battle honours (see below)
- Fate: Sold for scrap, 1954

General characteristics (as built)
- Class & type: J-class Flotilla leader
- Displacement: 1,690 long tons (1,720 t) (standard); 2,330 long tons (2,370 t) (deep load)
- Length: 356 ft 6 in (108.66 m) o/a
- Beam: 35 ft 9 in (10.90 m)
- Draught: 12 ft 6 in (3.81 m) (deep)
- Installed power: 2 × Admiralty 3-drum boilers; 44,000 shp (33,000 kW)
- Propulsion: 2 × shafts; 2 × geared steam turbines
- Speed: 36 knots (67 km/h; 41 mph)
- Range: 5,500 nmi (10,200 km; 6,300 mi) at 15 knots (28 km/h; 17 mph)
- Complement: 183 (218 for flotilla leaders)
- Sensors & processing systems: ASDIC
- Armament: 3 × twin 4.7-inch (120 mm) guns; 1 × quadruple 2 pdr (40 mm (1.6 in)) AA guns; 2 × quadruple 0.5 in (12.7 mm) machineguns; 2 × quintuple 21 in (533 mm) torpedo tubes; 1 × depth charge rack, 2 × throwers, 20 × depth charges

Service record
- Part of: 7th Destroyer Flotilla (1939–1940); 14th Destroyer Flotilla (1940–1945)
- Commanders: Captain Philip Mack (1939–1942); Captain A.L Poland (1942); Captain A.F Pugsley (January 1943– 22 June 1943); Captain J.S Crawford (22 June 1943– November 1943); Lt. Commander Roger P. Hill (1944)
- Operations: Battle of Cape Matapan (March 1941); Battle of the Tarigo Convoy (April 1941); Battle of Crete (May 1941); Second Battle of Sirte (March 1942); Operation Vigorous (June 1942); Operation Husky (July 1943); Operation Avalanche (September 1943); Dodecanese Campaign (September–November 1943); Operation Shingle (January 1944); Operation Neptune (June 1944)

HMS Jervis, was a J-class destroyer built for the Royal Navy in the late 1930s. She was named after Admiral John Jervis (1735–1823). She was laid down by R. and W. Hawthorn, Leslie and Company, Limited, at Hebburn-on-Tyne on 26 August 1937. The ship was launched on 9 September 1938 and commissioned on 8 May 1939, four months before the start of the Second World War.

Designed as a flotilla leader to the J-class destroyers, who were intended to make up the 7th Destroyer Flotilla, Jervis was the sister ship of, and identical to, Kelly, leader to the K class (forming the 8th Flotilla) and similar to Napier of the N class. However, despite an impressive war record (she earned 13 battle honours) she remains virtually unknown compared to her sister, Kelly.

== Service history ==
=== 1939 (Home Waters) ===
When war broke out in September 1939, Jervis was under the command of Captain Philip Mack, and was leader of the 7th Destroyer Flotilla (DF) based in the Humber. The first six months of hostilities was taken up with sweeps across the North Sea, in "appalling weather conditions" which saw the Flotilla suffer a succession of storm and collision damage. During this time Jervis captured three blockade runners, one on the second day of the war, and helped search for the merchant ship SS City of Flint. In March 1940 Jervis was involved in a collision with the Swedish freighter SS Tor, that put her in dock for the next three months for repairs.

=== 1940 (Mediterranean) ===
During this time Mack, as Captain (D) led the Flotilla from Janus, and in May 1940 sailed with her for the Mediterranean to take command of the 14th Destroyer Flotilla. Jervis' pennant number changed to G00 around this time In July, after working-up trials, she joined him in Malta, where he resumed command. For the next two years Jervis saw action in a constant round of operations; sweeps along the coast, bombarding shore targets for the Army, protecting convoys to Malta, and screening major fleet movements.

=== 1941 ===
In 1941 Jervis was involved in a number of fleet actions. In March she was at Battle of Cape Matapan. In the course of the battle she was involved in the destruction of the Italian cruiser Zara which had been crippled by heavy guns in attempting to recover the Italian cruiser Pola, which had been stricken by an aerial torpedo. Then Jervis came alongside Pola and boarded her, taking off the wounded before, with the destroyer Nubian, torpedoing and sinking Pola. In April she led the force that annihilated an Axis convoy at the action off Sfax. In May she was in the Battle of Crete, where many Royal Navy ships were lost, including her sister ship Kelly. During the summer Jervis ran supplies to the beleaguered port of Tobruk and in December led the destroyers at the First Battle of Sirte. On returning to Alexandria, she was damaged in an Italian human torpedo attack which left her in dock for six weeks. The same attack badly damaged the battleships Queen Elizabeth and Valiant. Her Chaplain, George Sherlock, was awarded the DSC for "outstanding zeal, patience, and cheerfulness and for setting an example of wholehearted devotion to duty."

=== 1942 ===
Released at the end of January, she resumed operations. In April she joined the Malta Strike Force, although without Mack who left Jervis in March due to ill-health and was replaced as captain of Jervis, and Captain (D), by A.L Poland. He would command her, and lead the 14th Destroyer Flotilla, for the next year. In March 1942, under Poland's leadership, she again led the destroyers at the Second Battle of Sirte.

=== 1943 ===
On the night of 1/2 June, an Italian convoy of two supply ships escorted by a destroyer and a torpedo boat, was intercepted in the Battle of the Messina Convoy by Jervis (commanded by Captain A.F Pugsley) and the Greek destroyer Vasilissa Olga. A Wellington bomber dropped flares and after a short battle lasting half an hour, the two Allied destroyers sank the Italian torpedo boat Castore.

Jervis also saw action during the landings in Sicily, Calabria, Salerno, and Anzio, as well as operations in the Adriatic. She supported both the Eighth Army and Yugoslav partisans. In the autumn of 1943, Jervis was in the Aegean supporting the ill-fated operation against the Dodecanese Islands. On 16/17 October with HMS Penn, sank the submarine chaser UJ-2109 at Kalymnos.

=== 1944 (Home Waters) ===
On 23 January 1944 Jervis had her bows blown off while in company with Janus, the other destroyer being sunk by a German Fritz X guided bomb. There were no casualties and the damaged destroyer made it to Naples under her own power where, on 28 January her commanding officer, Captain Henderson, took over command of the flotilla leader Grenville while the latter's captain, Lieutenant Commander Roger Hill became CO of the damaged Jervis. The damaged destroyer subsequently steamed to Gibraltar where a new bow was put on the vessel. Then returning to Britain, no longer a Flotilla leader, Jervis saw action at the Normandy landings in the closing stages of the war. She was decommissioned in September 1944, paying off at Chatham prior to a further, major re-fit.

=== 1945 and post-war ===
Re-commissioned in May 1945, Jervis saw further service in the Mediterranean, policing the aftermath of World War II. She paid off into the reserve at Chatham in May 1946, and was then laid-up in the Gareloch where she was used for training of local Sea Cadets. Placed on the Disposal List in October 1947, she was one of a number of ships used for explosives trials in Loch Striven during 1948.

== Fate ==
Jervis was handed over to the British Iron and Steel Corporation for demolition in January 1949 and allocated to Arnott Young, arriving at Troon, on the Firth of Clyde for breaking up in September.

== "Lucky Jervis" ==
Jervis had a reputation as a lucky ship (in contrast to her sister, Kelly, who seemed to have more than her share of bad luck). Despite a long and active career, in 5½ years of war and 13 major actions, not one of her crew was lost to enemy action, possibly a unique record. An example of her luck might be seen in her action at Anzio in January 1944. Supporting the landing with gunfire, Jervis and her sister ship, Janus, were attacked by enemy aircraft using Henschel Hs 293 glider bombs. Both were hit; Janus’ forward magazine exploded, sinking her with the loss of nearly 160 of her crew; Jervis’ bow was blown off, but the destroyer was able to steam at about eight knots back to safety in Naples. Astonishingly, not one of her crew was harmed in this incident, and she was able to rescue over 80 of Janus’ crew.

== Battle honours ==
Jervis was awarded 13 battle honours for her service during the Second World War.

- Mediterranean 1940–44
- Libya 1940–42
- Malta convoys 1941–42
- Matapan 1941
- Sfax 1941
- Crete 1941
- Sirte 1942
- Sicily 1943
- Salerno 1943
- Aegean 1943
- Adriatic 1944
- Anzio 1944
- Normandy 1944

Only Orion and Nubian, who served in the Mediterranean with Jervis matched this record; it was exceeded by HMS Warspite, the Mediterranean Fleet flagship, which saw service in both World Wars.

== See also ==
- Raid on Alexandria (1941)
