= 14th Destroyer Flotilla =

- Active: (1916-1919), (1940-1944)
- Country: United Kingdom
- Branch: Royal Navy
- Size: Flotilla
- Battle honours: Battle of Cape Matapan (27-29.03.1941); Second Battle of Sirte (16.04.1941); Battle of the Tarigo Convoy (22.03.1942)

Commanders
- First: Captain Charles D. Roper

The 14th Destroyer Flotilla, or Fourteenth Destroyer Flotilla, was a naval formation of the British Royal Navy from April 1916 to 11 February 1919 and again from 1 June 1940 to January 1944.

== History ==
=== World War One ===
The flotilla was first established in April 1916 and operated with the Grand Fleet until November 1918. It was disbanded on 11 February 1919.

=== Second World War ===
The flotilla was reformed 1 January 1940 allocated to the Mediterranean Fleet until 28 January 1943. It was part of Force C at the Battle of Cape Matapan, 27 to 29 March 1941. The Flotilla was engaged at Battle of the Tarigo Convoy on 16 April 1941. It took part in the Second Battle of Sirte, (22 March 1942). It was next transferred to the Levant Command then at Alexandria until 2 July 1943. Reassigned back to the Mediterranean Fleet 1 October 1943. It was next operating with Force H where it remained until January 1944 then was de-established.

== Operational deployments ==
| Assigned to | Dates | Notes |
|---|---|---|
| Grand Fleet | April 1916 to February 1919 | disbanded |
| Mediterranean Fleet | 1 June 1940 to 28 January 1943 | reformed |
| Levant Command | 29 January 1943 to 2 July 1943 | initially based at Alexandria |
| Mediterranean Fleet | 3 July to 1 October 1943 | |
| Force H | 1 October 1943 to January 1944 | disbanded |

== Administration ==
=== Captains (D) afloat 14th Destroyer Flotilla ===
Incomplete list of post holders included:

| | Rank | Name | Term | Notes |
|---|---|---|---|---|
Captain (D) afloat 14th Destroyer Flotilla
| 1 | Captain | Charles D. Roper | 6 July 1916 – 28 August 1916 | |
| 2 | Captain | Walter L. Allen | 30 July 1916 – 5 August 1916 | |
| 3 | Captain | Harry R. Godfrey | March 1917 – 11 February 1919 | later V.Adm. |
| 4 | Captain | Philip J. Mack | 14 July 1940 - 19 March 1942 | CO, HMS Jervis & Captain (D) 14th Destroyer Flotilla |
| 5 | Captain | Albert Lawrence Poland | 19 March 1942 - August 1942 | |

== Sources ==
- DiGiulian, Tony. "Orders of Battle - Battle of Cape Matapan - Battles of the Mediterranean - World War II - NavWeaps". www.navweaps.com.
- Grehan, John; Mace, Martin (2014). The War at Sea in the Mediterranean 1940-1944. Barnsley, England: Pen and Sword. ISBN 9781473837362.
- Harley, Simon; Lovell, Tony. (2018) "Fourteenth Destroyer Flotilla (Royal Navy) - The Dreadnought Project". www.dreadnoughtproject.org. Harley and Lovell, 29 May 2018. Retrieved 9 July 2018.
- Houterman, J.N. "Royal Navy (RN) Officers 1939-1945 - M". www.unithistories.com. Houterman and Kloppes.
- Titterton, G. A. (2002). The Royal Navy and the Mediterranean: November 1940-December 1941. London, England: Psychology Press. ISBN 9780714652054.
- Watson, Dr Graham. (2015) "Royal Navy Organisation and Ship Deployment, World War One 1914-1918". www.naval-history.net. Gordon Smith.
- Watson, Dr Graham. (2015) "Royal Navy Organisation in World War 2, 1939-1945". www.naval-history.net. Gordon Smith.
- Willmott, H. P. (2009). The Last Century of Sea Power, Volume 1: From Port Arthur to Chanak, 1894–1922. Bloomington, IN, USA: Indiana University Press. ISBN 0253003563.
