= HMS Janus (F53) =

J-class destroyer

Coordinates: 41°26′N 12°38′E

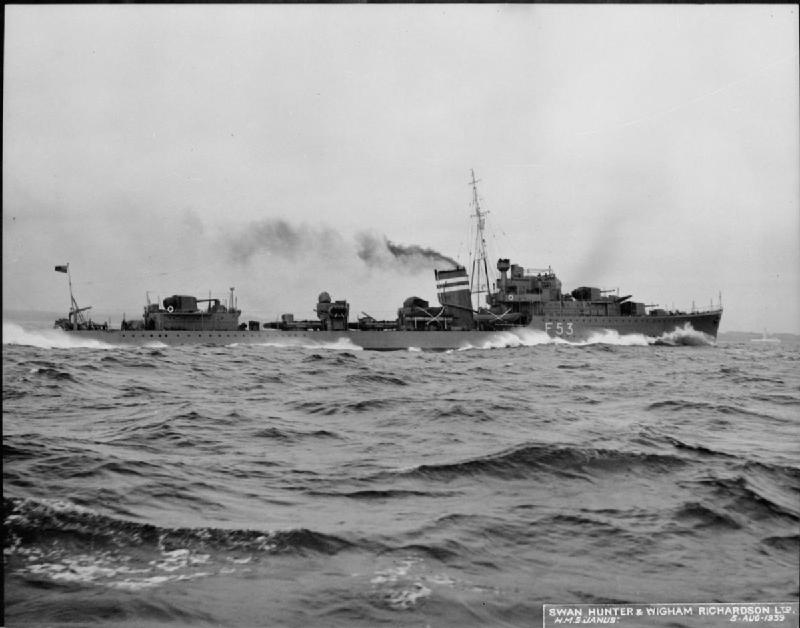
- Janus on sea trials in 1939

History

United Kingdom
- Name: HMS Janus
- Namesake: Roman god Janus
- Ordered: 25 March 1937
- Builder: Swan Hunter, Tyne and Wear, United Kingdom
- Laid down: 29 September 1937
- Launched: 10 November 1938
- Commissioned: 5 August 1939
- Identification: Pennant number: F53
- Fate: Sunk by a Fritz X bomb, 23 January 1944

General characteristics (as built)
- Class & type: J-class destroyer
- Displacement: 1,690 long tons (1,720 t) (standard); 2,330 long tons (2,370 t) (deep load)
- Length: 356 ft 6 in (108.66 m) o/a
- Beam: 35 ft 9 in (10.90 m)
- Draught: 12 ft 6 in (3.81 m) (deep)
- Installed power: 44,000 shp (33,000 kW); 2 × Admiralty 3-drum boilers
- Propulsion: 2 × shafts; 2 × geared steam turbines
- Speed: 36 knots (67 km/h; 41 mph)
- Range: 5,500 nmi (10,200 km; 6,300 mi) at 15 knots (28 km/h; 17 mph)
- Complement: 183 (218 for flotilla leaders)
- Sensors & processing systems: ASDIC
- Armament: 3 × twin 4.7 in (120 mm) guns; 1 × quadruple 2 pdr (40 mm (1.6 in) AA guns; 2 × quadruple 0.5 in (12.7 mm) anti-aircraft machineguns; 2 × quintuple 21 in (533 mm) torpedo tubes; 1 × rack, 2 × throwers for depth charges

HMS Janus, named after the Roman god, was a Javelin or J-class destroyer of the Royal Navy. She was ordered from the Swan Hunter & Wigham Richardson Limited at Wallsend-on-Tyne as part of the 1936 Build Programme and laid down on 29 September 1937, launched on 10 November 1938 and commissioned on 5 August 1939.

== Service history ==
=== North Sea and Mediterranean duties ===
Off Namsos, Norway, on 30 April 1940 the sloop Bittern was mistaken for a cruiser and was badly damaged by German Junkers Ju 87 dive bombers and had to be sunk by Janus. Janus served in the North Sea until May 1940 and had participated in over 20 convoy duties in that time. From May 1940 Janus began Mediterranean duties with the 14th Destroyer Flotilla in Alexandria. She participated in the Battle of Calabria in July 1940 and the Battle of Cape Matapan in March 1941, and in the action off Sfax in April 1941.

=== Fate ===
On 23 January 1944 Janus was struck by one Fritz X guided bomb dropped by a German He 111 torpedo bomber and sank off the Anzio beachhead in western Italy (according to another version, she was sunk by Henschel Hs 293 glider bomb or a conventional torpedo – see Fritz X article). It took a mere twenty minutes for Janus to sink. Of her crew only 80 survived, being rescued by HMS Laforey and smaller craft. It was recorded that during her last duty Janus had laid down nearly 500 salvos of 4.7-inch shells in the first two days of the landings in support of allied troops.

Janus's badge is still on display at the Selborne dry dock wall.
