= May 1941 =

Month of 1941

<<	May 1941					>>
Su	Mo	Tu	We	Th	Fr	Sa
				1	2	3
4	5	6	7	8	9	10
11	12	13	14	15	16	17
18	19	20	21	22	23	24
25	26	27	28	29	30	31

The following events occurred in May 1941:

== May 1, 1941 (Thursday) ==
- The Orson Welles-directed drama film Citizen Kane had its world premiere at the Palace Theatre in New York City.
- The week-long May Blitz of Liverpool began.
- Fighting in western Ethiopia between the Italian and Belgian Congolese colonial forces was halted for six weeks due to the rainy season.
- Gross-Rosen became an independent concentration camp.
- The British Government created the Ministry of War Transport and made Frederick Leathers its first head.
- The "Mad Dog" trial ended after twenty days when the jury found the Esposito brothers guilty of two counts of murder after just one minute of deliberation.
- German submarine U-568 was commissioned.
- A new breakfast cereal by General Mills named Cheerioats was introduced. Its name would be changed to Cheerios in 1945.
- USSR holds a military parade on Red Square in Moscow with German officials Ernst August Köstring and Hans Krebs invited as guests.
- Born: Magne Thomassen, speed skater, in Melhus, Norway

== May 2, 1941 (Friday) ==
- The Anglo-Iraqi War began, starting with airstrikes centred around RAF Habbaniya.
- The Romanian government established the National Center for Romanianization, which was mainly tasked with expropriating Jewish properties and distributing them to Romanians.
- The British destroyer HMS Jersey struck a mine at Malta's Grand Harbour and sank.

== May 3, 1941 (Saturday) ==
- Australian troops launched a counterattack at Tobruk, but it was repulsed by the Italians.
- The Province of Ljubljana was created when Italy annexed part of Slovenia including the city of Ljubljana.
- Whirlaway won the Kentucky Derby in a new Churchill Downs track record time of 2:01 2/5.
- German submarines U-205 and U-451 were commissioned.
- Born: Nona Gaprindashvili, chess player, in Zugdidi, Georgian SSR, Soviet Union

== May 4, 1941 (Sunday) ==
- The Battle of Amba Alagi began in East Africa.
- The third raid of the Belfast Blitz occurred overnight.
- British troops occupied the airport and docks of Basra.
- Adolf Hitler made an address to the Reichstag reviewing the Balkan campaign and declaring that the German Reich and its allies were superior to any conceivable coalition in the world.
- Born: Nickolas Ashford, R&B singer and one-half of Ashford & Simpson, in Fairfield, South Carolina (d. 2011)
- Died: William A. Welch, 72, American engineer and environmentalist

== May 5, 1941 (Monday) ==
- Haile Selassie re-entered the Ethiopian capital of Addis Ababa, exactly five years after it was occupied by Italian forces. May 5 is now celebrated in Ethiopia as Arbegnoch Qen, or Patriot's Day.
- The fourth and final raid of the Belfast Blitz took place overnight.
- Born: Alexander Ragulin, ice hockey player, in Moscow, USSR (d. 2004)

== May 6, 1941 (Tuesday) ==
- Iraqi troops withdrew from the plateau overlooking RAF Habbaniya after taking 1,000 casualties.
- Greenock Blitz: The Luftwaffe bombed the town of Greenock, Scotland for the first of two consecutive nights.
- A trade agreement was concluded between Japan and French Indochina.
- The Allies began Operation Tiger, a convoy maneuver from Gibraltar to Alexandria.
- Sanski Most Revolt: The Serbian population near Sanski Most in Axis-occupied Yugoslavia began an uprising against the repression of the Ustaše regime.
- Born: Ivica Osim, footballer and manager, in Sarajevo, Kingdom of Yugoslavia (d. 2022)
- Died: Shūzō Kuki, 53, Japanese scholar and philosopher

== May 7, 1941 (Wednesday) ==
- The Battle of South Shanxi began.
- Hull Blitz: German aircraft bombed the port city of Kingston upon Hull for the first of two consecutive nights.
- The British destroyer Hurricane was bombed and sunk during the Liverpool Blitz, but she would be repaired and returned to service in January 1942.
- The German weather ship München was captured near Iceland. Secret papers were found on board that improved the British understanding of the Enigma coding machines.
- Baseball star Hank Greenberg joined the U.S. Army.
- The Italian cargo steamship Pascoli, sailing from Italy, struck a mine south of Susak and sank; one crew member died.
- Born: Kinichi Hagimoto, comedian, in Tokyo, Japan
- Died: James George Frazer, 87, Scottish social anthropologist

== May 8, 1941 (Thursday) ==
- Action of 8 May 1941: The German commerce raider Pinguin was sunk by the British heavy cruiser HMS Cornwall in the Indian Ocean off the Seychelles.
- British and Transjordanian forces began the Assault on Rutbah Fort.
- The Sanski Most Revolt was suppressed on its third day.
- The Nottingham Blitz took place overnight.
- German submarine U-569 was commissioned.
- Born: Mahmoud Ahmed, singer, in Addis Ababa, Ethiopia

== May 9, 1941 (Friday) ==
- The Soviet Union declared that it would no longer recognize the diplomatic standing of Nazi-occupied Belgium, Norway and Yugoslavia.
- German submarine U-110 was captured in the Atlantic Ocean after being forced to surface by depth charges from British warships from convoy OB 318. The Royal Navy obtained the U-boat's code books and an entire Enigma machine.
- The Luftwaffe attempted to hit the Rolls-Royce aero engine factory in the East Midlands, but their bombs only managed to kill a few farm animals.
- The British cargo ship Empire Cloud was torpedoed and damaged on her maiden voyage by German submarine U-201 near Cape Farewell, Greenland with the loss of five crew. She would be towed, repaired and returned to service.
- Billie Holiday recorded the classic jazz song "God Bless the Child".
- Died: Fritz-Julius Lemp, 28, German U-boat commander (lost at sea during the capture of U-110)

== May 10, 1941 (Saturday) ==
- Deputy Führer Rudolf Hess flew a Messerschmitt Bf 110 to Scotland on a solo peace mission, parachuting into Eaglesham near his objective of Dungavel House after running out of fuel.
- The Luftwaffe mounted what would turn out to be the last major bombing raid on London, but one of the most devastating. Over 1,400 people were killed and 700 acres were set on fire, with the Houses of Parliament among the buildings damaged.
- The Strike of the 100,000 began in Nazi-occupied Belgium when workers went on strike for a wage increase.
- The cargo ship Empire Caribou from convoy OB 318 was torpedoed and sunk by German submarine U-556.
- The Italian auxiliary cruiser Ramb III was torpedoed and sunk at Benghazi Harbour by the British submarine HMS Triumph. The cruiser would be raised, repaired and returned to service.
- Whirlaway won the Preakness Stakes.
- Died: Cissy Fitzgerald, 68, English-American vaudeville performer

== May 11, 1941 (Sunday) ==
- The Assault on Rutbah Fort ended in Allied victory.
- Hitler met with Vichy Vice-Premier François Darlan at the Berghof. Hitler agreed to release French World War I veterans from POW camps (with the exception of officers and professional soldiers) in exchange for the Vichy government compromising its neutrality by allowing German planes to land in French Syria and to help supply the Afrika Korps from French Tunisia.
- British and Free French forces began Operation Josephine B with the objective of destroying an electrical transformer station in Pessac.
- Born: Eric Burdon, singer-songwriter, in Walker, Newcastle upon Tyne, England
- Died: Peggy Shannon, 34, American actress (heart attack)

== May 12, 1941 (Monday) ==
- The Nazi Party issued a press release on the subject of Rudolf Hess, claiming that he was "suffering from mental illness" and that the Führer had ordered the immediate arrest of those who helped Hess.
- Hitler abolished Rudolf Hess' post of Deputy Führer, transferred its duties to the new title of Chief of the Nazi Party Chancellery and appointed Martin Bormann to the job.
- British MPs met for the first time in their new temporary home, the House of Lords.
- Operation Tiger was completed successfully.
- The British gunboat HMS Ladybird was bombed and sunk at Tobruk by Luftwaffe aircraft.
- German submarine U-128 was commissioned.
- Died: Ruth Stonehouse, 48, American actress and film director

== May 13, 1941 (Tuesday) ==
- The Royal Air Force bombed Heligoland.
- British cargo ship SS Somersby was torpedoed and sunk in the Atlantic Ocean by German submarine U-111.
- OKW chief Wilhelm Keitel signed Barbarossa Decree.
- Vic Ghezzi won the PGA Championship.
- Born: Senta Berger, actress, in Vienna, Austria; Ritchie Valens, singer, songwriter and guitarist, in Pacoima, Los Angeles, California (d. 1959)
- Born: Jody Conradt, American women's basketball coach and University of Texas at Austin athletic director, in Goldthwaite, Texas, U.S.

== May 14, 1941 (Wednesday) ==
- Bulgaria annexed part of Greek Macedonia and Greek Thrace.
- The first mass round-up of Jews in Paris took place. More than 3,700 foreign Jews were arrested when they reported to a gymnasium for police examination of their status. They were sent to the internment camps of Pithiviers and Beaune-la-Rolande.
- German submarine U-82 was commissioned.
- The comic book superhero Plastic Man made his first appearance in Police Comics issue #1 (cover date August).
- Died: Maurice Bavaud, 25, Swiss citizen who attempted to assassinate Adolf Hitler in 1938 (executed by guillotine); Minnie Vautrin, 54, American missionary

== May 15, 1941 (Thursday) ==
- The British launched Operation Brevity, a limited offensive in the Egyptian and Libyan border area.
- The British attempted to keep the Nazis guessing as to what Rudolf Hess had told them by having Labour Minister Ernest Bevin say in the government's first official statement on the matter: "I do not believe that Hitler did not know that Hess was coming to England. From my point of view Hess is a murderer. He is no man I would ever negotiate with and I don't change even for diplomatic reasons. I am not going to be deceived."
- The Greek destroyer Leon was bombed and sunk in Souda Bay by Luftwaffe aircraft.
- Joe DiMaggio's 56-game hitting streak began inauspiciously with an RBI single off Eddie Smith in the bottom of the first inning, the New York Yankees' only run of the game as they lost to the Chicago White Sox 13–1.
- Born: Robert Kowalski, logician and computer scientist, in Bridgeport, Connecticut
- Died: Ulrich Grauert, 52, German Luftwaffe general (shot down near Saint-Omer)

== May 16, 1941 (Friday) ==
- Operation Brevity ended inconclusively.
- Karl Haushofer, a close friend of Rudolf Hess, was arrested by the Nazis.
- The British passenger ship Archangel was bombed and heavily damaged in the North Sea by Luftwaffe aircraft, killing 52 of the 475 aboard. The following day she was beached south of Newburgh, Aberdeenshire.

== May 17, 1941 (Saturday) ==
- In Albania, King Victor Emmanuel III of Italy and Albanian Prime Minister Shefqet Vërlaci survived an assassination attempt when 19-year old Albanian nationalist Vasil Laçi fired four shots at a car they were riding in. Laçi was arrested immediately and executed ten days later.
- Hitler issued Directive No. 29, Proposed Military Government of Greece.
- German submarine U-206 was commissioned.

== May 18, 1941 (Sunday) ==
- The Germans launched Operation Rheinübung, a sortie into the Atlantic to block Allied shipping to England.
- Prince Aimone, Duke of Aosta was designated King of Croatia in a ceremony at the Quirinal Palace in Rome. He accepted the title and took the regnal name of Tomislav II but would never actually rule in Croatia.
- The Strike of the 100,000 officially ended in Belgium after the German occupiers agreed to raise wages.
- Born: Miriam Margolyes, actress, in Oxford, England
- Died: Werner Sombart, 78, German economist and sociologist

== May 19, 1941 (Monday) ==
- The Battle of Amba Alagi ended in British victory when Prince Amedeo, Duke of Aosta formally surrendered.
- William Dobbie became Governor of Malta.
- The Viet Minh was formed.
- Born: Bobby Burgess, dancer and singer, in Long Beach, California; Nora Ephron, filmmaker, in New York City (d. 2012); Heinz Oberhummer, physicist and skeptic, in Bischofshofen, Austria (d. 2015)

== May 20, 1941 (Tuesday) ==
- The Battle of Crete began with an airborne invasion by the Germans.
- Japanese ambassador to Washington Kichisaburō Nomura sent confirmation to Tokyo that the Americans were reading some of their coded messages.
- Born: Goh Chok Tong, 2nd Prime Minister of Singapore, in Singapore

== May 21, 1941 (Wednesday) ==
- The British destroyer HMS Juno was bombed and sunk southeast of Crete by Italian aircraft.
- The American steamship SS Robin Moor was stopped in the tropical Atlantic by the German submarine U-69. The ship's crew and passengers were allowed to board lifeboats and then the Robin Moor was torpedoed and scuttled, creating an international incident between Germany and the United States.
- The Central Committee War Section met in Moscow. Joseph Stalin dismissed intelligence indicating a German attack on the Soviet Union was imminent, believing it was misinformation from the British trying to draw the Soviet Union into the war. When the head of Soviet intelligence argued with Stalin he was arrested and shot.
- German authorities ordered the United States to withdraw their representatives in Paris from the city by June 10.
- The Machita incident ended in southern Arizona when the elderly O'odham chief and medicine man Pia Machita was arrested for inciting his people to dodge the draft.
- A theatre strike began in Norway as a response to the revocation of working permits for six actors who refused to perform on Nazi-controlled radio.
- German submarine U-129 was commissioned.
- Born: Bobby Cox, baseball player and manager, in Tulsa, Oklahoma

== May 22, 1941 (Thursday) ==
- The British cruisers Fiji and Gloucester and the destroyer Greyhound were all bombed and sunk by the Luftwaffe around Crete.
- Hannah Arendt and her husband, Heinrich Blucher, along with many other refugees fleeing the gestapo and the death camps in Europe, arrive at Ellis Island in the United States aboard the SS Guine.
- The Allies captured Sodo in Ethiopia.
- Jews in Croatia were required to wear yellow badges.
- German submarines U-373, U-402 and U-571 were commissioned.
- Born: Menzies Campbell, politician, in Glasgow, Scotland (d. 2025)

== May 23, 1941 (Friday) ==
- The British destroyers Kashmir and Kelly were bombed and sunk by the Luftwaffe off Crete.
- King George II of Greece fled to Egypt.
- Vichy Vice-Premier François Darlan made a radio broadcast to the French people denying that he was ever asked to hand over the French Navy or any colonial territory during his recent conversations with Hitler. "France freely is choosing the road she is taking," Darlan stated. "On her depends her present and her future. She will have the peace which she makes herself. She will have the place in the organization of Europe which she will have made for herself."
- Hitler issued Directive No. 30, Support of anti-British Forces in Iraq.
- World heavyweight boxing champion Joe Louis retained his title with a win over Buddy Baer by disqualification in the seventh round at Griffith Stadium in Washington.

== May 24, 1941 (Saturday) ==
- The Battle of the Denmark Strait was fought. The German battleship Bismarck and heavy cruiser Prinz Eugen sank the British battlecruiser HMS Hood.
- The Italian converted troopship Conte Rosso was sunk off the coast of Sicily by the British submarine HMS Upholder, killing 1,300.
- Jan Smuts was made a field marshal of the British Empire.
- The results of a Gallup poll were published asking Americans, "Do you think President Roosevelt has gone too far in his policies of helping Britain, or not far enough?" 59% said about right, 21% said too far and 20% said not far enough.
- German submarines U-433 and U-752 were commissioned.
- Born: Bob Dylan, singer and songwriter, in Duluth, Minnesota
- Died: Lancelot Holland, British admiral (killed in the Battle of the Denmark Strait)

== May 25, 1941 (Sunday) ==
- British and Commonwealth troops counterattacked at Galatos.
- The British sloop Grimsby was bombed and sunk by Italian aircraft north of Tobruk.
- Girondins ASP defeated SC Fives 2–0 in the Coupe de France Final.
- German submarine U-653 was commissioned.

== May 26, 1941 (Monday) ==
- The last battle of the battleship Bismarck began in the Atlantic Ocean. That morning a British Catalina reconnaissance aircraft spotted the Bismarck. Starting at dusk, ships and aircraft of the Royal Navy and Royal Air Force attacked the battleship with torpedoes. A hit from a Fairey Swordfish torpedo bomber jammed the Bismarck's rudder, leaving her unable to steer and extremely vulnerable. Credit for launching the critical torpedo has previously been given to John Moffatt, but many historians now credit it to Kenneth Pattisson.
- The Germans launched Operation Skorpion, a counter-attack at Halfaya Pass.
- The U.S. Supreme Court decided United States v. Classic.

== May 27, 1941 (Tuesday) ==
- After taking more damage, the crippled Bismarck was severely damaged from overwhelming Royal Navy shelling and torpedoes from the battleships HMS King George V and HMS Rodney and the Heavy Cruiser HMS Dorsetshire; still afloat despite the enemy bombardment, the Bismarck was scuttled by his own crew.
- The Battle of South Shanxi ended in Japanese victory.
- In the Battle of 42nd Street, the Allies temporarily halted the German advance in Crete.
- Operation Skorpion ended with the Germans recapturing Halfaya Pass.
- Archibald Wavell sent a message to Churchill explaining that Crete was "no longer tenable" and that troops must be withdrawn. The Chiefs of Staff agreed and ordered evacuation.
- President Roosevelt gave a fireside chat announcing an unlimited national emergency.
- Born: Teppo Hauta-aho, double bassist and composer, in Helsinki, Finland (d. 2021)
- Died: Vasil Laçi, 19, Albanian patriot who attempted to assassinate the king of Italy and the prime minister of Albania (executed); Günther Lütjens, 52, German admiral (killed in the sinking of the Bismarck)

== May 28, 1941 (Wednesday) ==
- The Allies began to evacuate Crete.
- The British destroyer Mashona was bombed and sunk by the Luftwaffe off the coast of Galway.
- Nazi Germany and Vichy France signed the Paris Protocols, granting the Germans military facilities in French colonies in exchange for the French receiving a reduction in the occupation costs they were obligated to pay Germany as well as the release of French prisoners of war. The agreement would never be ratified.
- Died: Dudley Joel, 37, British businessman and Member of Parliament (killed in action when the steam merchant Registan was bombed and sunk off Cape Cornwall)

== May 29, 1941 (Thursday) ==
- The Germans captured Chania.
- The Allied garrison at Heraklion was evacuated.
- The British destroyer HMS Hereward was bombed and sunk by the Luftwaffe in the Kasos Strait.
- The British destroyer HMS Imperial was scuttled in the Mediterranean northeast of Bardia after being bombed and heavily damaged by Italian aircraft.
- German submarines U-132, U-452 and U-572 were commissioned.
- Born: Bob Simon, television correspondent, in the Bronx, New York (d. 2015)

== May 30, 1941 (Friday) ==
- British forces reached the outskirts of Baghdad.
- The Second Amendment of the Constitution of Ireland was signed into law.
- Floyd Davis and Mauri Rose won the Indianapolis 500. This was the last time in Indianapolis 500 history that one winning car would carry two different drivers. The race would not be held again until 1946.
- The service comedy film In the Navy starring Abbott and Costello was released.
- Died: Prajadhipok, 47, King of Siam from 1925 to 1935

== May 31, 1941 (Saturday) ==
- An armistice was signed in the Anglo-Iraqi War.
- Expropriation of Jewish property began in Belgium.
- German submarine U-502 was commissioned.
- Born: Louis Ignarro, pharmacologist and Nobel laureate, in Brooklyn, New York
