= Giuseppe Di Bartolo =

WW II Italian naval officer

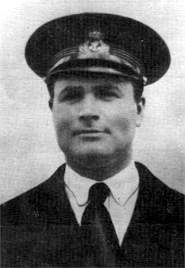
- Born: 5 September 1900; Palermo, Sicily, Italy
- Died: 20 January 1943 (aged 42); Mediterranean Sea
- Military career
- Allegiance: Kingdom of Italy
- Branch: Regia Marina
- Service years: 1940–1943
- Rank: Tenente di Vascello (Lieutenant)
- Commands: 7th Minesweeper Squadron; 25th Minesweeper Flotilla
- Conflicts: World War I; World War II; Battle off Zuwarah
- Awards: Gold Medal of Military Valor (posthumous)

Giuseppe Di Bartolo (5 September 1900 – 20 January 1943) was an Italian naval officer during World War II.

== Biography ==
Di Bartolo was born in Palermo in 1900, and graduated as a sea captain at the Palermo Nautical Institute at age 17. World War I was ongoing at the time, and Di Bartolo immediately embarked as deck officer on Italian merchant ships; on 18 July 1918 his ship, the steamer Adria, was torpedoed and sunk off Tunisia by the German submarine UB 50. For his behaviour during the sinking, he was given a commendation by the Ministry of the Navy.

After the end of World War I, Di Bartolo continued his career as a civilian sea captain, initially with the Navigazione Generale Italiana, then with the Società Italiana di Servizi Marittimi (SITMAR) and finally with Tirrenia di Navigazione. In April 1940, two months before Italy's entry into World War II, Di Bartolo became "complementary officer" of the Regia Marina (ufficiale di complemento, roughly comparable to an officer in the Royal Naval Reserve) with the rank of Lieutenant.

In July 1940, after Italy had entered the war, Di Bartolo was called up for service and given command of the 7th Minesweeper Flotilla, based in Porto Empedocle and part of the 4th Minesweeper Group. In April 1942, Di Bartolo was given command of the 25th Minesweeper Flotilla, based in Tripoli, Libya.

On 19 January 1943, a few days before Tripoli's fall to the Allies, the flotilla received order to evacuate Tripoli and reach Sicily. At 18:00 on that day, Di Bartolo left the Libyan port flying his flag on the minesweeper RD 36, leading a group of eleven minesweepers and small auxiliary vessels. About 20 miles east of Zuwarah, the flotilla was intercepted by the British destroyers Kelvin and Javelin. RD 36, whose size was about one tenth of the attacking destroyers' and whose only armament were a 76 mm gun and two 6,5 mm machine guns, headed towards the destroyers and opened fire on them, in an attempt to buy time for the other ships to retreat towards the coast. Massively outgunned, RD 36 was hit multiple times and sank; Di Bartolo perished with his ship and the entire crew. During the following hours, Kelvin and Javelin proceeded to hunt down and sink all the other vessels of the flotilla. For his sacrifice in the attempt to defend his flotilla against a fairly superior enemy, Di Bartolo was posthumously awarded a Gold Medal of Military Valor.
