= Italian minesweeper RD 36 =

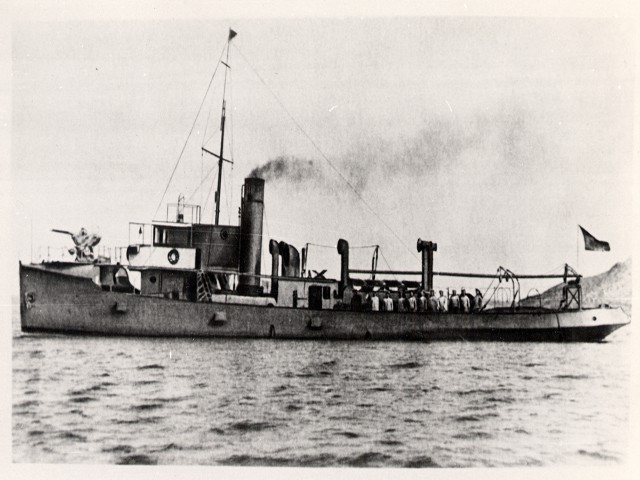
- RD 36 underway

History

Kingdom of Italy
- Name: RD 36
- Builder: Cantiere Navale di Castellammare di Stabia, Castellammare di Stabia
- Laid down: 27 March 1919
- Launched: 11 August 1919
- Commissioned: 6 November 1919
- Fate: Sunk in battle, 19 January 1943

General characteristics
- Class & type: RD 31-class minesweeper
- Displacement: 207 tonnes (204 long tons)
- Length: 35.35 m (116 ft 0 in)
- Beam: 5.8 m (19 ft 0 in)
- Draught: 1.54 m (5 ft 1 in) standard; 2.2 m (7 ft 3 in) full load
- Speed: 13 knots (24 km/h; 15 mph)
- Complement: 21
- Armament: 1 × 76 mm (3 in) gun; 2 × single 6.5 mm (0 in) machine guns
- Notes: Recipient of the Gold Medal of Military Valor "to the flag"

RD 36 was a minesweeper built for the Regia Marina in 1919 and later transferred to the Regia Guardia di Finanza. She saw action during World War II and, for the action that led to her sinking, she became one of the three Italian warships to be awarded the Gold Medal of Military Valor "to the flag" (the other two being the armoured cruiser San Giorgio and the submarine Scirè).

== History ==
Built in Castellammare di Stabia, the ship was launched in August 1919 and commissioned in the Regia Marina in November of the same year, but was later transferred to the naval branch of the Guardia di Finanza (GdF). On 19 August 1939, RD 36 was mobilized and assigned to the 11th Squadron of the 7th Minesweeping Flotilla, based in Porto Empedocle, Sicily.

During World War II, RD 36 carried out 317 minesweeping and transport missions (besides minesweeping, she was also used in the transport of men and materials to the Aegadian Islands), spending 2,776 hours at sea.

At 6:30 on 21 August 1941, during a minesweeping mission off Pozzallo together with the auxiliary minesweeper R 189 Santa Gilla, RD 36 was strafed by Allied planes and severely damaged; her commander, GdF Brigadier Francesco Mazzei, and two crewmen were killed, but the ship was able to return to the harbor.

On 4 September 1942, RD 36 was assigned to the 40th Minesweeping Flotilla and transferred to Tripoli, where she carried out minesweeping, anti-submarine and escort missions until the fall of the city, in January 1943.

At 18:00 on 19 January 1943, a few days before Tripoli's fall to the Allies, RD 36 (commanded by GdF Warrant Officer Aldo Oltramonti and carrying on board the flotilla commander, Lieutenant Giuseppe Di Bartolo) left Tripoli together with ten other minesweepers and small auxiliary vessels, in an attempt to reach Sicily. About 20 miles east of Zuwarah, the flotilla was intercepted by the British destroyers HMS Kelvin and HMS Javelin. RD 36, whose size was about one tenth of the attacking destroyers' and whose only armament were a 76 mm gun and two 6.5 mm machine guns, headed towards the destroyers and opened fire on them, in an attempt to buy time for the other ships to retreat towards the coast. Massively outgunned, RD 36 was hit multiple times and went down with all hands. During the following hours, Kelvin and Javelin proceeded to hunt down and sink all the other vessels of the flotilla.

For the action against overwhelming odds, RD 36 was awarded the Gold Medal of Military Valor "to the flag". Lieutenant Di Bartolo was also posthumously awarded the Gold Medal of Military Valor.

== See also ==
- Battle off Zuwarah
