= April 1941 =

Month of 1941

<<	April 1941					>>
Su	Mo	Tu	We	Th	Fr	Sa
		1	2	3	4	5
6	7	8	9	10	11	12
13	14	15	16	17	18	19
20	21	22	23	24	25	26
27	28	29	30

The following events occurred in April 1941:

== April 1, 1941 (Tuesday) ==
- The Battle of Keren in East Africa ended in Allied victory.
- The British withdrew from Brega.
- The Iraqi coup d'état overthrew the regime of Regent 'Abd al-Ilah and installed a pro-Nazi government with Rashid Ali al-Gaylani as Prime Minister.
- The Royal Air Force dropped the first 4,000-pound blockbuster bombs of the war, by Vickers Wellington medium bombers in a raid over Emden.
- The United States and Mexico signed an agreement in Washington allowing the reciprocal use of airfields and air space for the civil and military aircraft of both countries.
- Ford Motor Company workers at the River Rouge plant in Michigan went on strike in protest of the firing of several union members.

== April 2, 1941 (Wednesday) ==
- German and Italian forces pushed the British out of Ajdabiya.
- During one of his radio broadcasts, the anonymous pro-Nazi commentator derisively nicknamed Lord Haw-Haw confirmed his identity as William Joyce.
- Born: Dr. Demento, disc jockey and novelty record collector, in Minneapolis, Minnesota

== April 3, 1941 (Thursday) ==
- British troops captured Asmara, the capital of Eritrea.
- Hitler issued Directive No. 26, Co-operation with our Allies in the Balkans.
- László Bárdossy became Prime Minister of Hungary after Pál Teleki's suicide.
- German submarines U-564 and U-652 were commissioned.
- Born: Eric Braeden, actor, in Bredenbek, Germany; Jorma Hynninen, baritone, in Leppävirta, Finland; Philippé Wynne, soul and funk singer, in Detroit, Michigan (d. 1984)
- Died: Pál Teleki, 61, Prime Minister of Hungary (suicide)

== April 4, 1941 (Friday) ==
- The naval battle known as the action of 4 April 1941 was fought in the mid-Atlantic Ocean. The German commerce raider Thor sank the British auxiliary cruiser Voltaire.
- The Germans and Italians took Benghazi.
- Hitler issued Directive No. 27, Plan of Attack on Greece.
- The Greek torpedo boat Proussa was sunk by Italian aircraft off Corfu.
- Born: Bill Tarmey, actor, singer and author, in Ardwick, Manchester, England (d. 2012)

== April 5, 1941 (Saturday) ==
- Henry Maitland Wilson officially took command of the British "W" Force in Greece.
- German submarine U-76 was depth charged and sunk in the North Atlantic by British warships.
- Operation Savanna ended with the main Allied objective having failed.
- German submarine U-431 was commissioned.
- The drama film The Great Lie starring Bette Davis, George Brent and Mary Astor premiered in Littleton, New Hampshire as a benefit for a local hospital, one week before opening nationwide.
- Died: Parvin E'tesami, 34, Iranian poet; Nigel Gresley, 64, British steam locomotive engineer; Franciszek Kleeberg, 53, Polish general

== April 6, 1941 (Sunday) ==
- At 1:30 a.m. in Moscow, the Soviet Union and the new government of Yugoslavia signed a treaty of friendship and non-aggression. The treaty was backdated to April 5, possibly in anticipation of a German attack and the Russians wanting to avoid any impression that the agreement was signed while Yugoslavia was at war.
- The German-led Battle of Greece began at dawn when the XL Panzer Corps crossed the Greek border.
- The Battle of the Metaxas Line began.
- The German-led invasion of Yugoslavia began at 7 a.m. with a Luftwaffe assault, the opening stage of Operation Retribution.
- The Allies captured the Ethiopian capital of Addis Ababa.
- German battleship Gneisenau was heavily damaged by a Bristol Beaufort torpedo bomber while moored in Brest, France.
- The British cargo ship Clan Fraser was bombed by the Luftwaffe and sunk at Piraeus.
- Craig Wood won the Masters Tournament.
- Born: Gheorghe Zamfir, pan flute musician, in Găești, Romania
- Died: Kenneth Campbell, 23, Scottish pilot and posthumous Victoria Cross recipient (killed in the attack on the Gneisenau); Agenore Frangipani, 64, Italian general and Governor of Addis Ababa (suicide)

== April 7, 1941 (Monday) ==
- Axis troops retook Derna, Libya.
- The Luftwaffe sank 12 ships in an attack on the Greek port of Piraeus.
- On Budget Day in the United Kingdom, Chancellor of the Exchequer Kingsley Wood presented an innovative plan modeled after Keynesian economics that used taxation and forced savings to attack an estimated £500 million "inflation gap". Wood increased taxes by £250 million and projected a deficit of £2.304 billion, almost identical to the previous year's deficit of £2.475 billion. British newspaper editorials generally found the wartime sacrifices asked for in the budget to be reasonable and the stock exchange also took the news of the budget well. For the first time in British history, a majority of the population was liable to income tax.
- Britain severed diplomatic relations with Hungary, saying it had "become a base of operations against the Allies."
- The first night of the Belfast Blitz began.
- British general Richard O'Connor was captured by a German reconnaissance patrol in North Africa.
- The results of a Gallup poll were published asking Americans, "Which of these two things do you think it is more important for the United States to try to do — to keep out of the war ourselves, or to help England win, even at the risk of getting into the war?" 67% said help England, a 7 percent increase since the same question was polled three months previously.

== April 8, 1941 (Tuesday) ==
- British forces captured the crucial port city of Massawa and completed the conquest of Italian Eritrea.
- Axis troops captured Mechili, Libya.
- President Roosevelt sent Peter II of Yugoslavia a message promising that "the United States will speedily furnish all material assistance possible in accordance with its existing statutes. I send Your Majesty my most earnest hopes for a successful resistance to this criminal assault upon the independence and integrity of your country."
- Born: Peggy Lennon, singer (The Lennon Sisters), in Los Angeles, California

== April 9, 1941 (Wednesday) ==
- On the night of April 9 British airmen made the heaviest attack on Berlin which the city had so far suffered. The damage was done in the Government quarter and civilian casualties amounted to more than 2000.
- The Battle of Shanggao ended in Chinese victory.
- The Battle of the Metaxas Line ended in German victory.
- The Germans captured Thessaloniki.
- Greenland in World War II: The U.S. and Danish governments signed an agreement in which the Americans took over the defense of Greenland in exchange for the right to build air and naval bases there. The U.S. established a protectorate over Greenland the following day.
- Winston Churchill made a lengthy speech before the House of Commons reviewing the course of the war. He said in conclusion: "Once we have gained the Battle of the Atlantic and are sure of the constant flow of American supplies which are being prepared for us, then, however far Hitler may go or whatever new millions and scores of millions he may lap in misery, we who are armed with the sword of retributive justice shall be on his track."
- American battleship USS North Carolina was commissioned.
- Born: Kay Adams, country singer, in Knox City, Texas

== April 10, 1941 (Thursday) ==
- The Germans captured Zagreb and the Independent State of Croatia was proclaimed.
- The Siege of Tobruk began.
- German battleship Gneisenau was hit again in an RAF raid on Brest.
- German submarines U-401 and U-565 were commissioned.
- The trial of Anthony and William Esposito began in New York City. The brothers faced two counts of murder for the January 14 slaying of a police officer and a holdup victim. The case was a sensation in the New York media, who dubbed the defendants the "Mad Dog" brothers because they entered an insanity defense and displayed wild behavior such as walking in and out of the courtroom like apes, howling and gnawing on their own fingers.

== April 11, 1941 (Friday) ==
- Hungary joined the invasion of Yugoslavia. The Hungarian occupation of Yugoslav territories began.
- Battle of Vevi: British, Australian and New Zealand troops engaged the Germans in Greece for the first time south of Vevi.
- The Ford strike in Michigan ended after ten days with both sides agreeing to make concessions.
- The comedy film Road to Zanzibar, the second in the popular Road to ... film series starring Bing Crosby and Bob Hope, was released.
- Born: Shirley Stelfox, actress, in Dukinfield, Cheshire, England (d. 2015)

== April 12, 1941 (Saturday) ==
- The Germans captured Belgrade.
- The Battle of Vevi ended in German victory.
- In North Africa, the Germans captured Fort Capuzzo and Bardia.
- The Yugoslav monitors Morava, Sava and Vardar were scuttled to prevent capture.
- The Boston Bruins beat the Detroit Red Wings 3–1 to win the Stanley Cup in a four-game sweep.
- Born: Bobby Moore, footballer, in Barking, Essex, England (d. 1993)

== April 13, 1941 (Sunday) ==
- The Battle of Ptolemaida was fought, resulting in German victory.
- The Battle of Kleisoura Pass began.
- Soviet–Japanese Neutrality Pact: Japan and the Soviet Union signed a five-year Treaty of Neutrality, pledging to remain neutral in the event of one country being attacked by a third party. The pact also saw the Soviet Union recognize du jure Manchukuo for the first time.
- The British armed merchant cruiser Rajputana was torpedoed and sunk in the North Atlantic by German submarine U-108.
- Pope Pius XII broadcast an Easter address asking listeners to pray for an early peace. He directed a message to the occupying powers as well, saying, "let your conscience guide you in dealing justly, humanely and providently with the peoples of occupied territories. Do not impose upon them burdens which you in similar circumstances have felt or would feel to be unjust." The pope also called for an end to attacks against civilian targets.
- Born: Michael Stuart Brown, geneticist and Nobel laureate, in Brooklyn, New York
- Died: Annie Jump Cannon, 77, American astronomer

== April 14, 1941 (Monday) ==
- The Battle of Kleisoura Pass ended in German victory.
- Peter II of Yugoslavia fled to Athens as the German troops continued to advance.
- Born: Pete Rose, baseball player, in Cincinnati, Ohio (d. 2024)
- Died: John Edmondson, 26, Australian recipient of the Victoria Cross (killed in action at Tobruk)

== April 15, 1941 (Tuesday) ==
- Sarajevo surrendered to the Germans.
- Belfast Blitz: 200 Luftwaffe bombers attacked Belfast, Northern Ireland.
- In western Ethiopia, Italian colonial forces and Belgian Congolese troops clashed at Bortai Brook near Gambela.
- The Colima earthquake occurred in the State of Michoacán, Mexico. 90 people were reported dead.
- Born: Baby Lloyd Stallworth, member of The Famous Flames soul and R&B vocal group, in Tampa, Florida (d. 2002)

== April 16, 1941 (Wednesday) ==
- The Battle of the Tarigo Convoy was fought off the Kerkennah Islands near Tunisia. The British destroyer HMS Mohawk was sunk but the Italians lost two destroyers and five cargo ships.
- Armistice negotiations began between the Yugoslavians and the Germans.
- The British aircraft carrier HMS Furious was damaged in another day of German bombing during the Belfast Blitz.
- The entire 1st Battalion of the Italian 62nd Regiment was captured in a failed attack on Tobruk.
- Died: Josiah Stamp, 1st Baron Stamp, 60, English industrialist, economist and civil servant

== April 17, 1941 (Thursday) ==
- Yugoslavia formally surrendered to the Axis.
- The Yugoslav destroyer Zagreb was scuttled to prevent capture.
- German submarine U-566 was commissioned.
- Died: Sergej Mašera, 28, Yugoslav Navy officer; Milan Spasić, 31, Yugoslav Navy officer; Al Bowlly, famed British musician, 43. Killed by a Luftwaffe parachute mine that detonated outside his flat.

== April 18, 1941 (Friday) ==
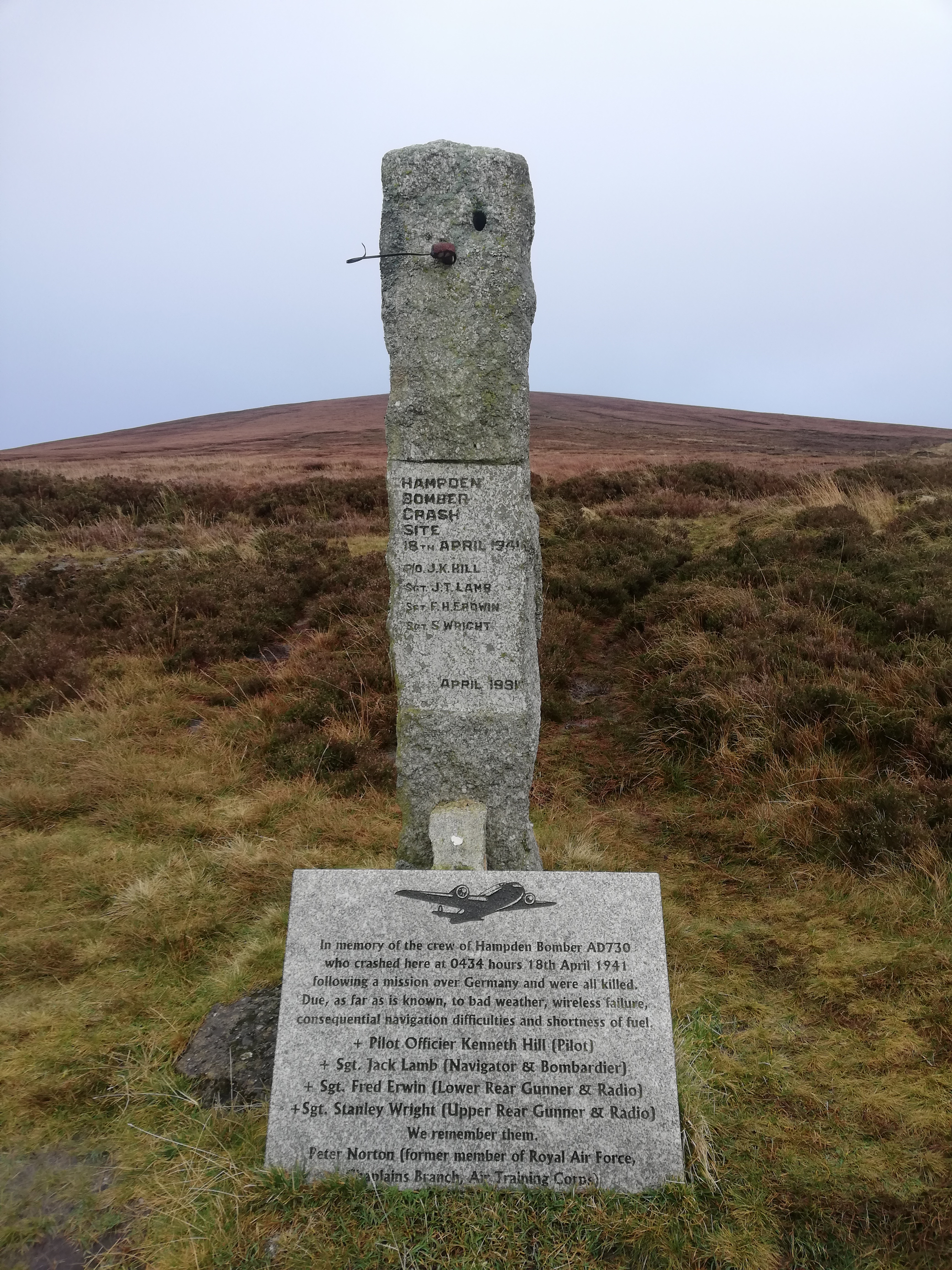
Memorial for a Royal Air Force Hampden bomber that crashed in the Wicklow Mountains, Ireland on 18 April 1941, with 4 deaths.

- The German 6th Mountain Division reached Mount Olympus.
- Athens was placed under martial law after Greek Prime Minister Alexandros Koryzis committed suicide.
- Vichy France announced its withdrawal from the League of Nations.
- Angler POW escape: 80 prisoners attempted to escape from the Angler POW camp near Neys Provincial Park in Ontario, Canada. Most were quickly apprehended except for two who managed to get all the way to Medicine Hat, Alberta by train before they were recaptured.
- The Messerschmitt Me 262 prototype had its first test flight, although only with a piston engine at first.
- Born: Michael D. Higgins, 9th President of Ireland, in Limerick, Ireland
- Died: Alexandros Koryzis, 55 or 56, Prime Minister of Greece (suicide)

== April 19, 1941 (Saturday) ==
- The Germans captured Larissa.
- The amphibious landing of British Commandos at Bardia known as the Bardia raid began.
- A nighttime German air-raid on London killed 13 firefighters, the largest single loss of firefighters in British history.
- The Bertolt Brecht play Mother Courage and Her Children had its world premiere at the Schauspielhaus Zürich in Switzerland.
- German submarine U-372 was commissioned.
- Les Pawson won the Boston Marathon.
- Steve Stanko posted the World's first official 1000 pound total at the Mid-Atlantic Championships in York Pennsylvania. He achieved this by posting a 310-pound clean and Press, a 310-pound snatch, and a 380-pound Clean and Jerk.

== April 20, 1941 (Sunday) ==
- Greek General Georgios Tsolakoglou, determined to deny the Italians the satisfaction of a victory he believed they had not earned, surrendered the Greek III Army Corps to the Germans.
- The air battle over Athens known as the Battle of Athens occurred.
- The Bardia raid ended in British victory.
- The British cargo liner Empire Endurance was torpedoed and sunk west of Rockall by the German submarine U-73.
- Luftwaffe aircraft bombed and sank the Greek passenger ship Ithaki in Souda Bay and the Greek destroyer Psara in the Saronic Gulf.
- The Greek destroyer Vasilefs Georgios was scuttled in the Salamis Naval Base to prevent capture. The Germans later raised it and put it into service as Hermes.
- Born: Ryan O'Neal, actor, in Los Angeles, California (d. 2023)
- Died: Pat Pattle, 26, South African fighter ace (killed in the Battle of Athens)

== April 21, 1941 (Monday) ==
- Georgios Tsolakoglou disobeyed orders from Greek high command and signed surrender papers to Sepp Dietrich in Larissa so the Greek army would not have to surrender to the Italians.
- The Royal Navy bombarded Tripoli, damaging the Italian torpedo boat Partenope and six freighters.
- Emmanouil Tsouderos became Prime Minister of Greece.
- The Greek destroyer Thyella was bombed and sunk by the Luftwaffe off Vouliagmeni.
- The writer Rex Stout made a speech in New York City in which he attacked the isolationist activism of Charles Lindbergh, saying, "I wish I could look you in the eye, Colonel Lindbergh, when I tell you that you simply don't know what it's all about ... A desperate war is being fought, and the winners of the war will win the oceans. No matter what we do, we shall be either one of the winners, or one of the losers; no shivering neutral will get a bite of anything but crow when the shooting stops. It would therefore seem to be plain imbecility not to go in with Britain and win."

== April 22, 1941 (Tuesday) ==
- The British captured Camboicia Pass in Ethiopia and took 1,200 Italians prisoner.
- The Luftwaffe bombed and sunk the Greek destroyer Hydra and the cargo ship Frinton.
- In the Plymouth Blitz, the communal air-raid shelter at Portland Square took a direct hit which killed 72 people.
- The Territory of the Military Commander in Serbia was established.

== April 23, 1941 (Wednesday) ==
- At Mussolini's insistence, a second Greek surrender document was signed up in Thessaloniki that included the Italians.
- King George II of Greece and the Greek government fled to Crete.
- The Greek battleship Kilkis and barracks ship Lemnos were bombed and sunk in Salamis Naval Base by the Luftwaffe.
- The results of a Gallup poll were published asking Americans, "If it appears certain that Britain will be defeated unless we use part of our navy to protect ships going to Britain, would you favor or oppose such convoys?" 71% expressed favor, 21% were opposed and 8% expressed no opinion.
- Born: Paavo Lipponen, Prime Minister of Finland, in Turtola, Finland; Ed Stewart, broadcaster, in Exmouth, Devon, England (d. 2016)

== April 24, 1941 (Thursday) ==
- The Battle of Thermopylae began.
- German submarines U-127 and U-567 were commissioned.
- Born: Richard Holbrooke, diplomat, in New York City (d. 2010); John Williams, classical guitarist, in Melbourne, Australia
- Died: Karin Boye, 40, Swedish poet and novelist

== April 25, 1941 (Friday) ==
- The Battle of Thermopylae ended in German victory, although the Allies fought a successful delaying action.
- Hitler issued Directive No. 28, Invasion of Crete.
- During a press conference, U.S. President Franklin D. Roosevelt seemed to compare Charles Lindbergh to Clement Vallandigham and the Copperheads of the American Civil War. Without using Lindbergh's name, Roosevelt said, "There are people in this country ... [who] say out of one side of the mouth, 'No, I don't like it, I don't like dictatorship,' and then out of the other side of the mouth, 'Well, it's going to beat democracy, it's going to defeat democracy, therefore I might just as well accept it.' Now, I don't call that good Americanism ... Well, Vallandigham, as you know, was an appeaser. He wanted to make peace from 1863 on because the North 'couldn't win.' Once upon a time there was a place called Valley Forge and there were an awful lot of appeasers that pleaded with Washington to quit, because he 'couldn't win.' Just because he 'couldn't win.' See what Tom Paine said at that time in favor of Washington keeping on fighting!"
- The British submarine Usk was lost in the Mediterranean, probably to a naval mine, on or sometime after this date.

== April 26, 1941 (Saturday) ==
- The Battle of the Corinth Canal was fought, resulting in German victory.
- South African 1st Brigade captured Dessie in northern Ethiopia and took 4,000 Italians prisoner.
- Soviet General Georgy Zhukov ordered a creeping mobilization of the Red Army.
- German submarine U-432 was commissioned.

== April 27, 1941 (Sunday) ==
- German troops marched into Athens.
- Slamat disaster: The Dutch troopship Slamat and the British destroyers Diamond and Wryneck were sunk in air attacks by Stuka dive bombers.
- Winston Churchill made a radio broadcast reporting on the war situation. "When I spoke to you early in February many people believed the Nazi boastings that the invasion of Britain was about to begin. Now it has not begun yet, and with every week that passes we grow stronger on the sea, in the air and in the number, quality, training and equipment of the great armies that now guard our island," Churchill said. Returning to the line in that February speech asking for the "tools" to "finish the job," Churchill said that "that is what it now seems the Americans are going to do. And that is why I feel a very strong conviction that though the Battle of the Atlantic will be long and hard and its issue is by no means yet determined, it has entered upon a more grim but at the same time a far more favourable phase."
- General Friedrich Paulus was dispatched to North Africa to exert some control from High Command over Erwin Rommel, who had been disregarding most orders from Berlin.
- Heinrich Himmler inspected Mauthausen concentration camp.
- Born: Lee Roy Jordan, American football player, in Excel, Alabama (d. 2025)

== April 28, 1941 (Monday) ==
- The Italians began occupying the Ionian and Aegean Islands.
- Free French troops advanced into pro-Vichy French Somaliland.
- German submarine U-65 was depth charged and sunk in the North Atlantic by the British destroyer HMS Douglas.
- Charles Lindbergh announced in a letter that he was resigning as a member of the Army Air Corps Reserve due to President Roosevelt's implied criticism of him. The U.S. War Department accepted his resignation the following day.
- Another Gallup poll result was released asking Americans, "If you were asked to vote today on the question of the United States entering the war against Germany and Italy, how would you vote — to go into the war, or to stay out of the war?" 81% said stay out, a 7 percent decrease since the same question was polled in January. Another question asked, "If it appeared certain that there was no other way to defeat Germany and Italy except for the United States to go to war against them, would you be in favor of the United States going to war?" 68% said yes, 24% said no, and 8% expressed no opinion.
- Born: Ann-Margret, actress, singer and dancer, in Valsjöbyn, Jämtland County, Sweden; Karl Barry Sharpless, chemist and Nobel laureate, in Philadelphia, Pennsylvania; Iryna Zhylenko, poet, in Kiev, Ukrainian SSR, Soviet Union (d. 2013)

== April 29, 1941 (Tuesday) ==
- Allied resistance ceased on the Greek mainland when 8,000 British, New Zealand, Australian, Greek and Yugoslavian troops surrendered at Kalamata.
- The British passenger ship City of Nagpur was torpedoed and sunk in the Atlantic Ocean by the German submarine U-75.
- German submarine U-84 was commissioned.
- Died: Bob McCowan, 66, Australian rugby union player

== April 30, 1941 (Wednesday) ==
- Georgios Tsolakoglou became the leader of the collaborationist Hellenic State.
- Hitler set the launch date of Operation Barbarossa to June 22.
- The Serbian puppet government known as the Commissioner Government was formed.
- The troop transport Nerissa was torpedoed and sunk by German submarine U-552. Nerissa was the only transport carrying Canadian troops to be lost during the war.
- The Boston Evening Transcript ceased publication after 111 years.
- German submarine U-501 was commissioned.
- Died: Edwin S. Porter, 71, American filmmaker
