= HMS Juno (F46) =

Destroyer of the Royal Navy

Coordinates: 34°35′N 26°34′E

- HMS Juno (F46)

History

United Kingdom
- Name: HMS Juno
- Builder: Fairfield Shipbuilding and Engineering Company
- Laid down: 5 October 1937
- Launched: 8 December 1938
- Commissioned: 25 August 1939
- Identification: Pennant number: F46
- Fate: Sunk by Italian aircraft, 21 May 1941

General characteristics (as built)
- Class & type: J-class destroyer
- Displacement: 1,690 long tons (1,720 t) (standard); 2,330 long tons (2,370 t) (deep load)
- Length: 356 ft 6 in (108.66 m) o/a
- Beam: 35 ft 9 in (10.90 m)
- Draught: 12 ft 6 in (3.81 m) (deep)
- Installed power: 44,000 shp (33,000 kW); 2 × Admiralty 3-drum boilers
- Propulsion: 2 × shafts; 2 × geared steam turbines
- Speed: 36 knots (67 km/h; 41 mph)
- Range: 5,500 nmi (10,200 km; 6,300 mi) at 15 knots (28 km/h; 17 mph)
- Complement: 183 (218 for flotilla leaders)
- Sensors & processing systems: ASDIC
- Armament: 3 × twin 4.7 in (120 mm) guns; 1 × quadruple 2 pdr (40 mm (1.6 in) AA guns; 2 × quadruple 0.5 in (12.7 mm) anti-aircraft machineguns; 2 × quintuple 21 in (533 mm) torpedo tubes; 1 × rack, 2 × throwers for depth charges

HMS Juno was a J-class destroyer of the Royal Navy laid down by the Fairfield Shipbuilding and Engineering Company, Limited, at Govan in Scotland on 5 October 1937, launched on 8 December 1938 and commissioned on 25 August 1939. Juno participated in the Battle of Calabria in July 1940 and the Battle of Cape Matapan in March 1941.

== Construction ==
The eight ships of the J class were ordered on 25 March 1937, and Juno was laid down with the name Jamaica at Fairfield's Govan shipyard on 5 October 1937. The ship was renamed Juno in September 1938 and was launched on 8 December 1938. The ship was completed on 25 August 1939, and was commissioned with the pennant number F46.

Juno was 339 feet 6 inches (103.48 m) long between perpendiculars and 356 feet 6 inches (108.66 m) overall, with a beam of 35 feet 8 inches (10.87 m) and a draught of 9 feet (2.7 m). Displacement was 1,690 long tons (1,720 t) standard and 2,330 long tons (2,370 t) deep load. Two Admiralty three-drum boilers fed steam at 300 pounds per square inch (2,100 kPa) and 620 °F (327 °C) to Parsons to two sets of Parsons single-reduction geared-steam turbines, rated at 40,000 shaft horsepower (30,000 kW). This gave a design speed of 36 knots (67 km/h; 41 mph) at trials displacement and 32 knots (59 km/h; 37 mph) at full load.

As completed, Juno had a main gun armament of six 4.7 in (120 mm) QF Mark XII guns in three twin mountings, two forward and one aft. These guns could only elevate to an angle of 40 degrees, and so were of limited use in the anti-aircraft role, while the aft mount was arranged so that it could fire forwards over the ship's superstructure to maximise the forward firing firepower, but was therefore incapable of firing directly aft. A short range anti-aircraft armament of a four-barrelled 2-pounder "pom-pom" anti-aircraft mount and eight .50 in machine guns in two quadruple mounts was fitted, while torpedo armament consisted of ten 21-inch (533 mm) torpedo tubes in two quintuple mounts. Anti-submarine armament consisted of two depth charge throwers and a single rack, with 20 depth charges carried, while the Two-Speed Destroyer Sweep (TSDS) minesweeping gear could also be carried.

=== Modifications ===
Early in the war, the aft 4.7-inch mount was modified to allow it to fire directly aft, while in mid-1941, the aft set of torpedo tubes was replaced by a single 4 inch (102 mm) Mk V anti-aircraft gun (although this gun was not provided with appropriate fire control and was therefore of limited use). Close-in armament was improved by replacing the .50 in machine guns with 4 single Oerlikon 20 mm cannon.

== Service ==
The initial work-up of the ship and her crew was interrupted by the German invasion of Poland on 1 September 1939, and on 6 September 1939, Juno and sister ships Janus and Jackal escorted the Norwegian steamer SS Batavia, carrying the staff of the British embassy in Berlin across the North Sea from Rotterdam to the Tongue lightship in the Thames estuary. She then resumed training and work up activities based at Devonport for the remainder of September, joining the 7th Destroyer Flotilla based on the Humber and operating off the east coast of Britain, with duties including patrols and escorting convoys. On the night of 6/7 December 1939, Juno and Jersey were on patrol off Cromer when they encountered two German destroyers, Hans Lody and Erich Giese, returning from a minelaying sortie. Juno and Jersey did not spot the two German ships, which launched 7 torpedoes, one of which hit Jersey. Juno in response, searched for a submarine, which was believed to have fired the torpedo, allowing the German destroyers to escape unchallenged. When it was realised that there was no submarine, Juno took Jersey under tow, taking the damaged destroyer to Immingham.

Juno continued in service with the 7th Flotilla until March 1940, with her service interrupted by a refit at Kingston upon Hull from 5 February to 2 March 1940 and by repairs to her feedwater tanks from 9 to 20 March. On 5 April 1940, Juno left Methil together with the destroyers Javelin, Janus and Grenade as escort to the Norway-bound convoy ON.25. The convoy met up with the covering cruisers Manchester and Southampton on 7 April, but later that day, reports of German heavy warships at sea caused the convoy to return to Britain. The reported German ships were, in fact, part of the German fleet taking part in the German invasion of Norway. Juno operated with the Home Fleet through April 1940 in operations to oppose the invasion. On 17 April, Juno, together with Janus, Kipling and Hereward, escorted the cruiser Suffolk as the cruiser shelled the airfield at Sola, Norway. The force came under heavy air attack, and Suffolk was hit by a bomb and badly damaged. On 23 April, Juno left Scapa Flow as part of the escort for the aircraft carriers Ark Royal and Glorious as the carriers provided air cover for landings at Åndalsnes and Namsos, the force returning to Scapa on 3 May.

On 18 May, Juno joined the 14th Destroyer Flotilla with the Mediterranean Fleet. In June, the flotilla participated in sweeps for Italian convoys, and in escorting Allied evacuation convoys MF1 and MS1 from Malta. In July, it carried out a bombardment of Bardia, Libya and participated in the Battle of Calabria. Juno spent the remainder of 1940 escorting convoys to Malta, bombarding Italian shore positions, and accompanying fleet movements including Operation Collar. In January 1941, Juno participated in Operation Excess, and in March took part in the Battle of Cape Matapan.

=== Fate ===
In May 1941 Juno was part of Force C commanded by Rear Admiral Edward King. With German invasion of Crete being imminent, Force C was ordered to patrol the northern and eastern approaches to the island. On May 20, 1941, Force C proceeded through Kasos Strait, but was quickly detected by the Italian aircraft. At 07:30 on May 21, 1941 2 Italian SM-79 bombers on a reconnaissance mission spotted two cruisers and 4 destroyers of Force C moving at 24 knots in the direction of Rhodos. An attack commenced at 9:50 involved 5 CANT Z.1007bis, 6 SM-84 and 3 SM-79 of Regia Aeronautica, and 17 Ju-87 of III.StG.2 and continued on until approximately 13:50. Force C antiaircraft fire was able to successfully disrupt the majority of the attacks. However, at 12:49 a group of five Italian CANT Z.1007bis aircraft from 210a Squadriglie led by Lt. Mario Morassutti, attacked the formation with 10 250 and 15 100 kg bombs. Juno was hit by 2 100 kg bombs striking the boiler and engine rooms and the aft magazines. The ship capsized and sank within 2 minutes with a loss of 116 men and 104 survivors.
