= HMS Jackal (F22) =

Destroyer of the Royal Navy

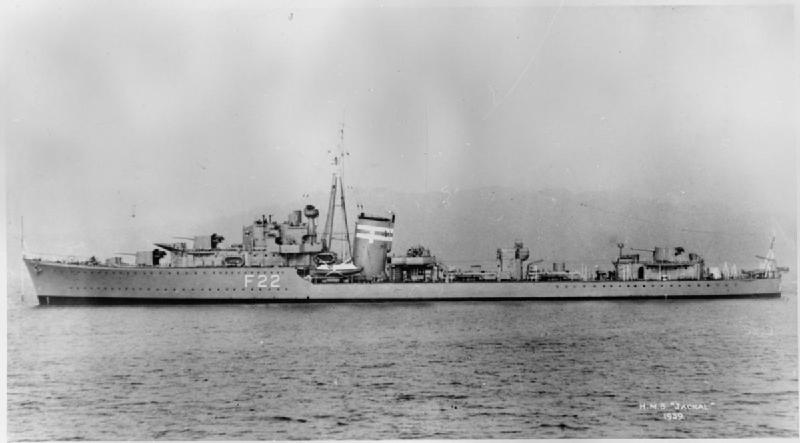
- HMS Jackal in May 1939

History

United Kingdom
- Name: Jackal
- Builder: John Brown & Company, Clydebank
- Laid down: 24 September 1937
- Launched: 25 October 1938
- Commissioned: 13 April 1939
- Identification: Pennant number: F22
- Fate: Damaged by the Luftwaffe's Lehrgeschwader 1 and scuttled at 36°30′N 26°30′E

General characteristics (as built)
- Class & type: J-class destroyer
- Displacement: 1,690 long tons (1,720 t) (standard); 2,330 long tons (2,370 t) (deep load)
- Length: 356 ft 6 in (108.66 m) o/a
- Beam: 35 ft 9 in (10.90 m)
- Draught: 12 ft 6 in (3.81 m) (deep)
- Installed power: 44,000 shp (33,000 kW); 2 × Admiralty 3-drum boilers
- Propulsion: 2 × shafts; 2 × geared steam turbines
- Speed: 36 knots (67 km/h; 41 mph)
- Range: 5,500 nmi (10,200 km; 6,300 mi) at 15 knots (28 km/h; 17 mph)
- Complement: 183 (218 for flotilla leaders)
- Sensors & processing systems: ASDIC
- Armament: 3 × twin 4.7 in (120 mm) guns; 1 × quadruple 2 pdr (40 mm (1.6 in) AA guns; 2 × quadruple 0.5 in (12.7 mm) anti-aircraft machineguns; 2 × quintuple 21 in (533 mm) torpedo tubes; 1 × rack, 2 × throwers for depth charges

HMS Jackal was a J-class destroyer of the Royal Navy. Completed in 1939, Jackal served in the Norwegian campaign and the Dunkirk evacuation before being deployed to the Mediterranean in 1941. Jackal took part in the Battle of Crete, and was scuttled after being heavily damaged by German bombers on 12 May 1942.

== Construction and design ==
HMS Jackal was ordered, along with the rest of the J class, on 25 May 1937, and was laid down by John Brown and Company, Limited, at Clydebank in Scotland on 24 September 1937, launched on 25 October 1938 and commissioned on 13 April 1939, the first of the J class to be completed.

As completed, Jackal had a main gun armament of six 4.7 in (120 mm) QF Mark XII guns in three twin mountings, two forward and one aft. These guns could only elevate to an angle of 40 degrees, and so were of limited use in the anti-aircraft role, while the aft mount was arranged so that it could fire forwards over the ship's superstructure to maximise the forward firing firepower, but was therefore incapable of firing directly aft. A short range anti-aircraft armament of a four-barrelled 2 pounder "pom-pom" anti-aircraft mount and eight .50 in machine guns in two quadruple mounts was fitted, while torpedo armament consisted of ten 21 inches (533 mm) torpedo tubes in two quintuple mounts.

In an attempt to strengthen its anti-aircraft armament, one of Jackal's banks of torpedo tubes was removed in favour of a single 4 inch Mk V anti-aircraft gun, while four Oerlikon 20 mm cannon replaced the .50 in machine guns.

== Operational history ==
=== Home Fleet ===
After commissioning and workup, Jackal joined the 7th Destroyer Flotilla, part of the Royal Navy's Home Fleet. On the outbreak of the Second World War, the 7th Flotilla moved to the Humber, Duties included carrying out anti-submarine patrols and convoy escort missions in the North Sea, English Channel and the Western Approaches. On 6 September 1939, Jackal and sister ships Janus and Juno escorted the Norwegian steamer SS Batavia, carrying the staff of the British embassy in Berlin across the North Sea from Rotterdam to the Tongue lightship in the Thames estuary. Jackal collided with Janus at Kirkwall in Orkney on 14 October 1939, and after repair operated off the east coast of Britain for the next few months. On 28 February 1940, Jackal was badly damaged in a collision with the Swedish merchant ship Storfors (which was sunk), and was under repair at Blyth Shipbuilding Company, Northumberland until April 1940.

When repaired, Jackal was deployed in support of Allied forces in the Norwegian campaign, escorting troopships and carrying out shore bombardments, before being transferred to Harwich, as part of the Nore Command, carrying out convoy escort and patrol operations. In July 1940, Jackal took part in the Dunkirk evacuation, patrolling to protect the evacuation ships. Following Dunkirk, Jackal returned to the routine of convoy escort and patrols. On 11 October Jackal, together with the battleship HMS Revenge and the destroyers Javelin, Jaguar, Jupiter, Kelvin, Kipling and Kashmir, shelled Cherbourg harbour. On 29 November 1940, Jackal, Javelin, Jupiter, Jersey and Kashmir were deployed to try to intercept a sortie by the German destroyers Karl Galster, Hans Lody and Richard Beitzen that resulted in Jackal's sister ship Javelin, commanded by Lord Louis Mountbatten, being torpedoed and badly damaged.

=== Mediterranean Fleet ===
In April 1941, Jackal was transferred to the Mediterranean Fleet. In May 1941 Jackal formed part of the escort for Operation Tiger, a convoy carrying tanks from Gibraltar to Alexandria, before being detached to shell Benghazi together with Kelly, Kelvin, Kashmir and Kipling on the night of 10/11 May, with Jackal being near missed (at a distance of 20 yd (18 m)) by a bomb that failed to explode on 11 May. On 20 May, Germany launched an airborne invasion of Crete, and Jackal sailed the next day for the region to intercept German attempts to carry out landings by sea. On 23 May, Jackal, Kelly, Kelvin, Kashmir and Kipling were deployed to search for and attack German invasion forces, but were attacked by German dive bombers, with Kelly and Kashmir being sunk. Jackal evacuated troops from Heraklion and Sphakia on 28 and 31 May, with Allied forces on Crete surrendering on 1 July.

Jackal was next deployed in support of Operation Exporter, the Allied invasion of Vichy French controlled Syria and Lebanon. On 9 June, Jackal and Janus engaged the Vichy French destroyers Valmy and Guépard when the French ships attacked Australian ground forces. Both Jackal and Janus were hit by shells from the French ships, with Janus sustaining serious damage although Jackal sustained no casualties, before the French ships retired to port. On 4 July Jackal took part in bombardment operations off the coast of Syria.

In August 1941, the Royal Navy was tasked with the replacement of Australian and Indian troops in besieged Tobruk with fresh troops, with the operation being carried out on moonless nights by destroyers and fast minelayers. On the evening of 21 August, Jackal, Kandahar and Griffin were carrying out a run when their fighter cover of Curtiss Tomahawks of No. 2 Squadron SAAF and Hawker Hurricanes of No. 1 Squadron SAAF were attacked by German Messerschmitt Bf 110 fighters, with one of each side's aircraft being shot down and the pilot of the shot down Tomahawk being picked up by one of the destroyers. Jackal formed part of the escort of the battleship HMS Barham when the German submarine U-331 torpedoed and sank Barham on 25 November 1941, with Jackal helping to rescue survivors and unsuccessfully attempting to attack U-331. On 1 December 1941, Jackal, Jervis, Jaguar and Kipling were ordered to intercept three Italian destroyers that were reported to be off Derna, Libya. The British destroyers failed to locate the Italian ships, and were attacked by three Italian SM.79 torpedo bombers. Jackal was hit on the stern by a torpedo, and was badly damaged, with her steering gear wrecked and her judder jammed. Two of the torpedo bombers were damaged by defensive fire from the destroyers, with one having to force land. and was under repair at Alexandria until April 1942.

=== Loss ===
On 10 May 1942, the 14th Destroyer Flotilla, consisting of Jackal, Jervis, Kipling and Lively set out from Alexandria to intercept an Italian convoy sailing from Italy to Benghazi. The flotilla was sighted by German reconnaissance aircraft on the afternoon of 11 May, and in accordance with orders, as surprise had been lost, the destroyer flotilla abandoned the attack and reversed course. A first wave of German bombers, eight Junkers Ju 88s of I/Lehrgeschwader 1 (I/LG 1) based at Heraklion on Crete, arrived at about 16:31 hrs, sinking HMS Lively with 3 direct hits. A second wave of nine Ju 88s and four Heinkel He 111s of II/LG 1 from Eleusis, Greece, attacked between 18:09 and 18:33, but caused no damage. A third wave, consisting of ten Ju 88s from I/LG 1, attacked at about 20:00 hrs. Kipling was quickly sunk by the attacks, while Jackal was severely damaged by the bomber flown by Gerhard Brenner, with one direct hit and three near misses. Jackal was taken under tow by Jervis, but was suffering from an extensive fire and progressive flooding, and the ship was abandoned on the morning of 12 May and scuttled by Jervis by torpedoing. Nine officers and men from Jackal were killed, while total losses from the three destroyers were 77 killed.
