= Action off Zuwarah =

- Part of the Battle of the Mediterranean of World War II
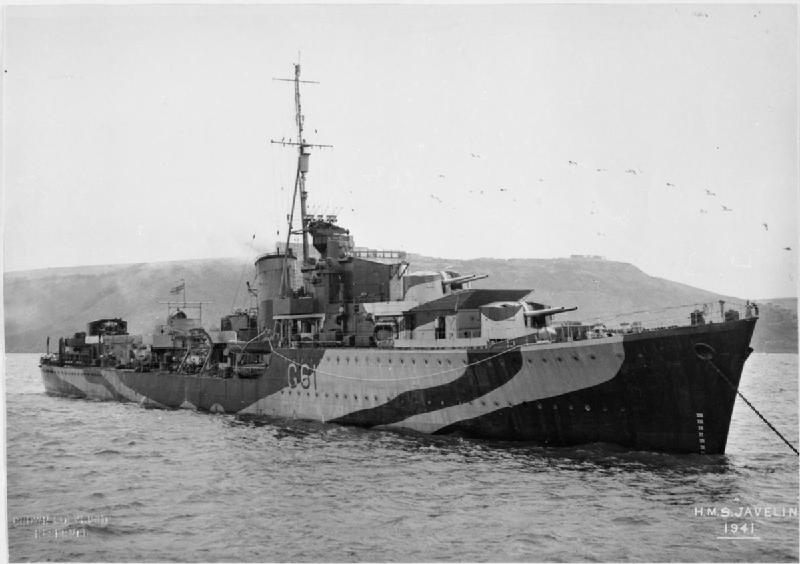
- HMS Javelin (1941)
Date	19/20 January 1943
Location	Off Zuwarah, Mediterranean Sea 32°56′N 12°05′E
Result	British victory

Belligerents
United Kingdom	Italy

Commanders and leaders
Michael Townsend	Giuseppe Di Bartolo †

Strength
2 destroyers	6 minesweepers 1 trawler 1 patrol boat 1 pump boat

Casualties and losses
7 wounded	180 killed 6 minesweepers sunk 1 trawler sunk 1 patrol boat sunk 1 pump boat sunk

The Action off Zuwarah (19/20 January 1943) was a night encounter during the Second World War. The battle took place in Libyan waters between the Royal Navy and the Regia Marina. An Italian flotilla of small minesweepers and auxiliary vessels evacuating Tripoli was destroyed by two British destroyers.

== Background ==
On 15 January 1943, the destroyers HMS Kelvin and HMS Nubian, blockading the port of Tripoli in Libya, had forced the torpedo boat Perseo to retire damaged and then sunk the 4,537 GRT D'Annunzio, a merchant ship trying to escape from Tripoli, on 15 January. On the night of 19/20 January, the British destroyers Kelvin and Javelin patrolled off Zuwarah, about 55 nmi (102 km; 63 mi) west of Tripoli, to cut off the escape of the last Italian ships from Tripoli.

== Prelude ==
The Type 271 radar on Javelin detected ships heading west towards the Tunisian coast, from the direction of Tripoli. The ships were the Tripoli minesweeping flotilla (Lieutenant Giuseppe Di Bartolo), which had been ordered to leave the city for Tunisia and then to Italy, to avoid capture. The flotilla was made up of four small minesweeping tugs (RD 31, RD 36, RD 37 and RD 39, of which RD 36 and 37 had Italian Guardia di Finanza crews; the naval trawler Scorfano, the largest ship in the convoy, the small tanker Irma; the auxiliary minesweepers DM 12 Guglielmo Marconi (a requisitioned brigantine); R 26 Angelo Musco and R 224 Cinzia (two former fishing vessels); the auxiliary patrol vessel V 66 Astrea (a motor sailing vessel) and the pump boat S. Barbara (towed by Scorfano).

== Action ==
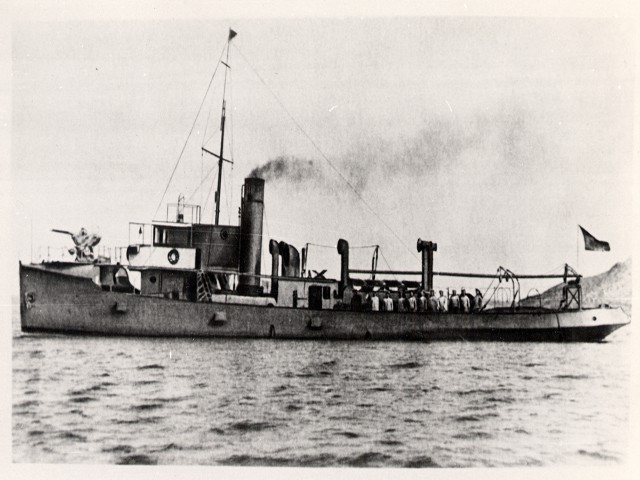
Photograph of the Italian minesweeper RD 36

Javelin and Kelvin moved to intercept the Italian ships, fired star shells to illuminate them and then mistook the vessels for an Italian convoy. The Italians were able neither to fight back (the RD minesweepers being armed with a 76 mm gun and two 6.5 mm machine-guns each, while the other ships carried only machine guns) nor to escape, being slower than the destroyers. RD 36, the flotilla leader, tried to cover the retreat of the other ships but was soon sunk with all hands. The other vessels, fleeing towards the coast to allow their crews to escape, were picked off one-by-one. RD 37 and Scorfano were sunk with no survivors; Marconi was set on fire but all of her crew escaped before she sank and Irma was finished off with a torpedo.

== Aftermath ==
=== Analysis ===
By the morning of 20 January, the flotilla had been annihilated. Kelvin had expended 300 rounds of 4.7-inch ammunition and Javelin 500 rounds. Javelin and Kelvin quickly headed for Malta, where they arrived safely the next day. RD 36 and its crew were awarded the Gold Medal of Military Valour for the action against overwhelming odds.

=== Casualties ===
The Italians suffered 180 fatal casualties and the survivors either swam ashore or were picked up by Italian vessels the next day.

== Orders of battle ==
=== British destroyers ===
British anti-shipping patrol
Name	Flag	Type	Notes
HMS Kelvin	Royal Navy	K-class destroyer	Fired 300 4.7-inch shells, returned to Malta
HMS Nubian	Royal Navy	Tribal-class destroyer	Fired 500 4.7-inch shells, returned to Malta

=== Italian convoy ===
Italian evacuation convoy
Name	Flag	Type	Notes
RD 31	Kingdom of Italy	RD 31-class minesweeper	Guardia di Finanza, sunk
RD 36	Kingdom of Italy	RD 31-class minesweeper	Guardia di Finanza flag Giuseppe Di Bartolo, sunk
RD 37	Kingdom of Italy	RD 31-class minesweeper	Guardia di Finanza, sunk
RD 39	Kingdom of Italy	RD 31-class minesweeper	Guardia di Finanza, sunk
Scorfano	Kingdom of Italy	Naval trawler	Towed Santa Barbara, sunk
R 224 Cinzia	Kingdom of Italy	Auxiliary minesweeper	71 GRT, sunk
DM 12 Guglielmo Marconi	Kingdom of Italy	Auxiliary minesweeper	Brigantine, 304 GRT, sunk
R 26 Angelo Musco	Kingdom of Italy	Auxiliary minesweeper	69 GRT, sunk
Irma	Merchant Navy	Tanker	305 GRT, sunk
V 66 Astrea	Merchant Navy	Tanker	136 GRT, sunk
Santa Barbara	Merchant Navy	Barge	Towed by Scorfano, sunk
