= Greek torpedo boat Pergamos =

History

Austria-Hungary
- Name: 95 F
- Builder: Ganz & Danubius
- Laid down: January 19, 1915
- Launched: March 8, 1916
- Commissioned: June 17, 1916
- Out of service: 1919
- Fate: Assigned to the Kingdom of Greece

Greece
- Commissioned: 1919
- Decommissioned: April 25, 1941
- Fate: Scuttled at Salamis Island during German invasion of Greece

General characteristics
- Displacement: 243 tons standard
- Length: 57.76 m (189.5 ft)
- Beam: 5.8 m (19 ft)
- Draft: 1.5 m (4.9 ft)
- Propulsion: 2 Yarrow water-tube boilers; 2 AEG-Curtis steam turbines; 2 shafts; 5,000 / 6,000 shp
- Speed: 31 knots (57 km/h) maximum (32 knots (59 km/h) after 1925)
- Complement: 41
- Armament: 2 × Skoda 66 mm (2.6 in) / 30-cal guns; 1 × 8 mm anti-aircraft machine gun added in 1914; 4 × 450 mm torpedo tubes (2 × 2)

The Greek torpedo boat Pergamos (Greek: TA Πέργαμος) served in the Royal Hellenic Navy from 1919–1941. Originally the ship was the Austro-Hungarian 250t-class "F"-group torpedo boat SMS Tb 95-F. She was named for the ancient Greek city of Pergamon (today known as Bergama) located in Anatolia; the city was part of the territory awarded at the end of World War I in the Treaty of Sèvres to Greece for being on the Allied side.

The ship, along with two sister ships of Fiume-class torpedo boats Panormos and Proussa was transferred to Greece as a war reparation from the Central Powers in 1919.

== Service in the Austro-Hungarian navy ==
In the build-up to the First World War, Austria-Hungary ordered four 250–tonne boats to be built at the Ganz & Co.– Danubius shipyard in 1912/13. The Navy asked for several improvements compared with the Trieste–class boats. Negotiations broke down in early December because of exaggerated prices requested by Danubius and were only resumed when pressured by the Hungarian Minister of Commerce. Danubius lowered its price by 10%. Finally Ganz & Co. – Danubius got orders for 16 torpedoboats in 1913, despite the fact that original plans had called for the Naval Arsenal Pola to build the Tb 86 to Tb 100 series. These ‘Fiume–boats’ were commissioned under the numbers Tb 82 F to Tb 97 F between August, 1914 and August, 1916. They differed from their Trieste sister–ships having two funnels and an extended forecastle.

== Service in the Hellenic navy ==
Pergamos served in the Hellenic navy from 1919 until she was sunk during the German invasion of Greece on April 25, 1941. She was at the naval base at Salamis Island when she was scuttled.

== See also ==
- History of the Hellenic Navy
