= Greek torpedo boat Panormos =

History

Greece
- Laid down: November 30, 1914
- Launched: September 29, 1915
- Acquired: 1919 as war reparation from Austria-Hungary
- Commissioned: 1919
- Decommissioned: March, 1928
- Fate: Sank off Cape Tourlos, Aegina 1928

General characteristics
- Displacement: 243 tons standard
- Length: 57.76 m (189.5 ft)
- Beam: 5.8 m (19 ft)
- Draft: 1.5 m (4.9 ft)
- Propulsion: 2 Yarrow water-tube boilers; 2 AEG-Curtis steam turbines; 2 shafts; 5,000 / 6,000 shp
- Speed: 31 knots (57 km/h) maximum (32 knots (59 km/h) after 1925)
- Complement: 41
- Armament: 2 × Skoda 66 mm (2.6 in) / 30-cal guns; 1 × 8 mm anti-aircraft machine gun added in 1914; 4 × 450 mm torpedo tubes (2 × 2)

The torpedo boat Panormos (Greek: TA Πανόρμος) served in the Royal Hellenic Navy from 1919–1928. Originally the ship was the Austro-Hungarian Fiume-class torpedo boat SMS Tb 92-F. She was named for the city of Panormos (today known as Bandırma) located on the Sea of Marmara; the city was part of the territory awarded to Greece for joining the side of the allied in the Treaty of Sèvres at the end of World War I.

The ship, along with two sister ships of the Fiume-class torpedo boats Pergamos and Proussa was transferred to Greece as a war reparation from the Central Powers in 1919 and were named after cities in Asia Minor.

== Service in the Austro-Hungarian navy ==
In the build-up to the First World War, Austria-Hungary ordered four 250–tonne boats to be built at the Ganz & Co.– Danubius shipyard in 1912/13. The Navy asked for several improvements compared with the Trieste class boats. Negotiations broke down in early December because of exaggerated prices requested by Danubius and were only resumed when pressured by the Hungarian Minister of Commerce. Danubius lowered its price by 10%. Finally Ganz & Co. – Danubius got orders for 16 torpedoboats in 1913, despite the fact that original plans had called for the Naval Arsenal at Pola to build the Tb 86 to Tb 100 series. These ‘Fiume–boats’ were commissioned under the numbers Tb 82 F to Tb 97 F between August, 1914 and August, 1916. They differed from their Trieste sister–ships having two funnels and an extended forecastle.

== Service in the Greek navy ==
Panormos served in the Greek navy from 1919 during the Greco-Turkish War (1919–1922) and thereafter until she was sunk off Cape Tourlos, Aegina in March, 1928.

== See also ==
- History of the Hellenic Navy
