= March 1941 =

Month of 1941

<<	March 1941					>>
Su	Mo	Tu	We	Th	Fr	Sa
						1
2	3	4	5	6	7	8
9	10	11	12	13	14	15
16	17	18	19	20	21	22
23	24	25	26	27	28	29
30	31

The following events occurred in March 1941:

== March 1, 1941 (Saturday) ==
- The Battle of South Henan ended in Chinese victory.
- Bulgaria signed the Tripartite Pact joining the Axis powers as German troops marched from Romania into Bulgaria.
- Heinrich Himmler inspected the Auschwitz concentration camp and ordered it to be expanded to hold 30,000 prisoners.
- Free French forces completed the Capture of Kufra.
- The United States Senate voted unanimously to establish a special committee to find and correct problems in American war production. This bipartisan committee became known as the Truman Committee, named for its head Harry S. Truman.
- The book Germany Must Perish! by Theodore N. Kaufman was published in the United States. Nazi propaganda would use this book to support the claim that Jews were plotting against Germany.
- Born: Joo Hyun, actor, in Korea
- Died: Ruby Laffoon, 72, 43rd Governor of Kentucky

== March 2, 1941 (Sunday) ==
- German troops reached the border of Greece.
- Turkey closed the Dardanelles to all ships without Turkish permits and pilots.
- Parliamentary elections were held in Chile. The Radical Party emerged as the country's largest party.

== March 3, 1941 (Monday) ==
- Turkey canceled its non-aggression pact with Bulgaria after only two weeks.
- An earthquake in the Greek city of Larissa left 10,000 homeless.
- U.S. President Franklin D. Roosevelt signed an order freezing all Bulgarian assets in the United States.
- A famous image of a weeping Frenchman (Jérôme Barzotti) was published in this week's issue of Life magazine. The photograph is a still from film footage shot in Marseille during a procession of French regimental flags on their way to Africa to preserve them from surrender.
- German submarine U-125 was commissioned.
- The U.S. Supreme Court decided Railroad Commission v. Pullman Co.

== March 4, 1941 (Tuesday) ==
- Operation Claymore: British Commandos conducted a raid on the Nazi-occupied Lofoten Islands in Norway. They achieved their objective of destroying fish oil factories and some 3,600 tons of oil and glycerine, and also captured German code information.
- Regent Prince Paul of Yugoslavia met with Adolf Hitler at Berchtesgaden. Paul set his conditions for Yugoslavia to join the Axis, including that Salonika be ceded to Yugoslavia after the war. Hitler agreed to all conditions except that the terms of the agreement be published.
- Argentina defeated Chile 1–0 to win the South American Championship of football.
- The Boston Bruins took 83 shots on goal during a 3–2 win over the Chicago Black Hawks. Two NHL single-game records were set that still stand: number of shots on goal by one team, and number of saves by a goaltender (Sam LoPresti with 80).
- Born: Adrian Lyne, film director, in Peterborough, Northamptonshire, England
- Died: Nigel Cullen, 23, Australian fighter ace (shot down near Himarë, Albania)

== March 5, 1941 (Wednesday) ==
- Britain severed diplomatic relations with Bulgaria.
- The Panamanian government gave the United States permission to extend American air defenses beyond the limits of the Panama Canal.
- A referendum on the policies of Ion Antonescu was held in Romania. The vote was recorded as 99.9% in favour.
- Hitler issued Directive No. 24, Co-operation with Japan.
- The anthology drama radio series Author's Playhouse premiered on the NBC Blue Network.

== March 6, 1941 (Thursday) ==
- Ethiopia's Patriots led by Haile Selassie captured Bure.
- Winston Churchill issued the Battle of the Atlantic directive, creating a committee to oversee the logistics of that theatre.
- The United States ordered the Italian consulates in Detroit and Newark closed in retaliation for the closings of February 15.
- German submarine U-560 was commissioned.
- Died: Gutzon Borglum, 73, Danish-American artist and sculptor best known for creating the Mount Rushmore memorial

== March 7, 1941 (Friday) ==
- Operation Lustre: The first British soldiers from North Africa arrived in Greece.
- German submarine U-47 went missing west of Ireland. The sub's fate remains unknown.
- Died: Günther Prien, 33, German U-boat ace (went missing aboard U-47)

== March 8, 1941 (Saturday) ==
- The United States Senate passed the Lend-Lease bill by a vote of 60–31.
- Philadelphia Phillies pitcher Hugh Mulcahy became the first major league baseball player to be conscripted in the Selective Service draft. He served in the Pacific Theater, winning the Bronze Star in the Leyte campaign.
- German submarine U-204 was commissioned.
- The mystery film Footsteps in the Dark starring Errol Flynn and Brenda Marshall was released.
- Died: Sherwood Anderson, 64, American writer

== March 9, 1941 (Sunday) ==
- The Italian Spring Offensive began in the Greco-Italian War. Benito Mussolini, in a radio address from Albania, announced that he was personally commanding the offensive.
- German aircraft bombed London and damaged Buckingham Palace. The Café de Paris nightclub was also heavily damaged and did not re-open until after the war.
- Born:
  - Ernesto Miranda, criminal, in Phoenix, Arizona (d. 1976)
  - Delphine Medjo, Cameroonian politician, in Douala (d. 2016)

== March 10, 1941 (Monday) ==
- Belgian Congolese troops entered Ethiopia from the west and captured the Italian garrison town of Asosa by surprise.
- A nighttime German bombing raid on Portsmouth sank a minesweeping trawler and damaged three destroyers, a training ship and four other minesweeping trawlers.
- Japanese rear admiral Takijirō Ōnishi gave Isoroku Yamamoto a draft of the Pearl Harbor attack plan.
- Beer was rationed in Vichy France due to a shortage of barley and hops. Starting March 15, beer could not be sold on Saturdays or Tuesdays.
- Born: Arifin C. Noer, Indonesian film and theater director and scenario writer (d. 1995)
- Died: William Eagleson Gordon, 74, Scottish recipient of the Victoria Cross

== March 11, 1941 (Tuesday) ==
- President Roosevelt enacted H.R. 1776, the Lend-Lease Act.
- Thailand in World War II: Vichy French and Thai delegates negotiated a treaty in which Thailand regained territory west of the Mekong River.
- German bombing during the Manchester Blitz severely damaged the Old Trafford football stadium.
- Bronko Nagurski defeated Ray Steele to reclaim the National Wrestling Association World Heavyweight Championship.
- Born: Shelly Zegart, American quilt historian, in Pittsburgh

== March 12, 1941 (Wednesday) ==
- President Roosevelt asked Congress for $7 billion in Lend-Lease aid.
- Born: Erkki Salmenhaara, composer and musicologist, in Helsinki, Finland (d. 2002)

== March 13, 1941 (Thursday) ==
- Clydebank Blitz: The Luftwaffe bombed the Scottish shipbuilding town of Clydebank for the first of two nights.
- 15 members of the Dutch resistance were executed by firing squad in Scheveningen.
- German submarines U-79 and U-561 were commissioned.

== March 14, 1941 (Friday) ==
- The Battle of Shanggao began.
- The largest bombing raid of the Leeds Blitz took place.
- The cargo ship Western Chief was torpedoed and sunk in the North Atlantic by the Italian submarine Emo.
- Born: Wolfgang Petersen, film director and screenwriter, in Emden, Germany (d. 2022)
- Died: C. R. M. F. Cruttwell, 53, British historian and academic

== March 15, 1941 (Saturday) ==
- The American journalist Richard C. Hottelet was arrested by the Gestapo in Berlin on suspicion of spying.
- At the White House Correspondents' Dinner, President Roosevelt made a speech promising aid to the British and their allies "until total victory has been won."
- The Allies began Operation Savanna, with the goal of landing Free French paratroops into German-occupied France to ambush and kill as many pilots of the Kampfgeschwader 100 as possible.
- German submarine U-371 was commissioned.
- "The Song of the Volga Boatmen" by Glenn Miller and His Orchestra hit #1 on the Billboard singles charts.
- Born: Mike Love, musician and co-founder of The Beach Boys, in Los Angeles, California
- Died: Alexej von Jawlensky, 77, Russian expressionist painter

== March 16, 1941 (Sunday) ==
- The Italian Spring Offensive ended in complete failure for the Italians.
- British forces landed at Berbera.
- A fire broke out on the docked German ocean liner SS Bremen, causing such extensive damage that the ship would be scrapped. Initially thought to be the work of raiders, the arsonist was later said to have been a cabin boy avenging a punishment.
- Hitler gave a Heldengedenktag speech at the Berlin Zeughaus, reviewing Germany's battlefield performance over the past twelve months and declaring that England would be defeated.
- Born: Robert Guéï, 3rd President of Ivory Coast, in Kabakouma, Man, French West Africa (d. 2002); Chuck Woolery, game show host, in Ashland, Kentucky (d. 2024)

== March 17, 1941 (Monday) ==
- 162 planes of the Luftwaffe bombed the Avonmouth district of Bristol.
- German submarine U-100 was depth charged and sunk by British warships when it attacked the convoy HX 112.
- German submarine U-99 was scuttled southeast of Iceland after being severely damaged by the British destroyers Walker and Vanoc. This was the first successful use of radar by surface units against U-boats, a factor in the ending of Germany's First Happy Time.
- The National Gallery of Art in Washington, D.C. was opened by President Roosevelt.
- Born: Paul Kantner, rock guitarist, singer and co-founder of Jefferson Airplane, in San Francisco, California (d. 2016)
- Died: Joachim Schepke, 29, German U-boat commander (died in the sinking of U-100); Nicolae Titulescu, 59, Romanian diplomat

== March 18, 1941 (Tuesday) ==
- The Luftwaffe bombed Liverpool and Birkenhead.
- Erwin Rommel departed North Africa for a meeting with Adolf Hitler.
- The British armed boarding vessel Rosaura struck a naval mine off Tobruk and sank.
- Born: Wilson Pickett, singer and songwriter, in Prattville, Alabama (d. 2006)

== March 19, 1941 (Wednesday) ==
- Hitler gave Yugoslavia an ultimatum to join the Axis within five days or face invasion.
- Rommel met with Hitler, Walther von Brauchitsch and Franz Halder. Rommel was told he could expect no reinforcements in Libya until May when he would receive the 15th Panzer Division.
- Died: Nikolai Semenovich Kurnakov, 80, Russian chemist

== March 20, 1941 (Thursday) ==
- British troops took Hargeisa.
- The Yugoslavian cabinet voted 16–3 to accept Hitler's proposals and join the Tripartite Pact.
- U.S. Under Secretary of State Sumner Welles warned the Soviet ambassador to Washington Konstantin Umansky that the United States had information confirming Germany's intention to attack the Soviet Union.
- German submarine U-562 was commissioned.
- Born: Kenji Kimihara, long-distance runner, in Kitakyushu, Japan

== March 21, 1941 (Friday) ==
- The Siege of Giarabub ended in Allied victory.
- Hungarian Foreign Minister László Bárdossy met with Hitler and Joachim von Ribbentrop in Munich to discuss the Balkan situation.
- Joe Louis defeated Abe Simon by technical knockout in the thirteenth round in Philadelphia to retain the world heavyweight boxing title.

== March 22, 1941 (Saturday) ==
- British troops overran the Italians in Babille Pass.
- Vichy French President Philippe Pétain signed a bill to construct a trans-Saharan railway, which was to be built by prisoners of war and Jews.
- German submarines U-126 and U-202 were commissioned.

== March 23, 1941 (Sunday) ==
- The German submarine U-551 was depth charged and sunk in the North Atlantic by the British anti-submarine trawler HMT Visenda.
- Born: Jim Trelease, educator and author, in Orange, New Jersey (d. 2022)
- Died: Tadeusz Tański, 49, Polish automobile designer (murdered at Auschwitz concentration camp)

== March 24, 1941 (Monday) ==
- German forces retook El Agheila.
- The U.S. Senate passed the president's $7 billion war-aid appropriation bill.
- The dramatic play Native Son by Paul Green and Richard Wright premiered at the St. James Theatre on Broadway.

== March 25, 1941 (Tuesday) ==
- Yugoslavian Prime Minister Dragiša Cvetković signed the Tripartite Pact in Vienna.
- Italo Gariboldi replaced Rodolfo Graziani as Governor-General of Italian Libya.
- The British ocean liner Britannia was sunk off the coast of Brazil by the German auxiliary cruiser Thor.
- The British cable ship CS Faraday was sunk by a Heinkel He 111 in the Bristol Channel.

== March 26, 1941 (Wednesday) ==
- British and South African forces captured Harar.
- The Italian Navy carried out the successful Raid on Souda Bay in Crete.
- Mass demonstrations and riots occurred throughout Yugoslavia in protest of the Tripartite Pact.
- 12 people were killed in food riots in Damascus and Aleppo, Syria. Martial law was declared in the region.
- Born: Richard Dawkins, ethologist, evolutionary biologist and writer, in Nairobi, British Kenya

== March 27, 1941 (Thursday) ==
- The Yugoslav coup d'état occurred. Dušan Simović and other Serb nationalist officers in the Royal Yugoslav Air Force overthrew Yugoslavia's pro-Axis government and intended to back out of the Tripartite Pact. When Hitler learned of the coup he issued Directive No. 25 ordering an invasion of Yugoslavia.
- The Battle of Cape Matapan began off the southwest coast of Greece.
- Ion Antonescu signed an anti-Jewish law providing for the segregation of Romania's Jews and expropriation of their urban property.
- Aboard the presidential yacht USS Potomac, President Roosevelt signed the $7 billion wartime appropriation bill.
- German Foreign Minister Joachim von Ribbentrop met his Japanese counterpart Yōsuke Matsuoka in Berlin.
- Japanese spy Takeo Yoshikawa arrived in Pearl Harbor. Yoshikawa noticed that battleships were berthed in pairs and that the in-shore ship was protected from torpedo attacks by the outboard one.
- German submarine U-563 was commissioned.

== March 28, 1941 (Friday) ==
- 17-year old Peter II of Yugoslavia, considered by the new government to be of age to take the throne, took the oath of King of Yugoslavia in Belgrade as crowds cheered.
- Hitler awarded Hanna Reitsch the Iron Cross Second Class, making her the first woman of the war to receive the medal.
- The research group of Glenn T. Seaborg of the University of California, Berkeley demonstrated that plutonium was fissionable and could be used as a weapon.
- Born: Philip Fang, simultaneous interpreter and United Nations official, in British Hong Kong (d. 2013); Jim Turner, American football placekicker, in Martinez, California (d. 2023)
- Died: Kavasji Jamshedji Petigara, 63, first Indian to become Deputy Commissioner of the Mumbai Police; Virginia Woolf, 59, English writer (suicide by drowning)

== March 29, 1941 (Saturday) ==
- British and South African forces took Dire Dawa.
- The Battle of Cape Matapan ended in Allied victory. The heavy cruisers Pola and Zara were among the five Italian warships sunk.
- Philippe Pétain created a General Commissariat for Jewish Affairs.
- Wisconsin defeated Washington State 39–34 in the championship game of the NCAA Men's Division I Basketball Tournament.
- "Amapola (Pretty Little Poppy)" by Jimmy Dorsey and His Orchestra topped the Billboard singles charts.
- Born: Joseph Hooton Taylor, Jr., astrophysicist and Nobel laureate, in Philadelphia, Pennsylvania

== March 30, 1941 (Sunday) ==
- Hitler held a conference with his generals in which he said that the upcoming war with Russia would be a race war in which communist commissars and Jews would be exterminated by SS Einsatzgruppen following behind the advancing armies. Hitler expected the Soviet Union to be defeated in a matter of weeks and declared, "We have only to kick in the door and the whole rotten structure will come crashing down."
- The British liner Umona was torpedoed and sunk off Freetown, Sierra Leone by the German submarine U-124.
- Born: Wasim Sajjad, President of Pakistan, in Jalandhar, Punjab, British India; Graeme Edge, English musician (The Moody Blues), in Rocester, Staffordshire (d. 2021)

== March 31, 1941 (Monday) ==
- 109 RAF bombers attacked the German warships Scharnhorst and Gneisenau in Brest, France, but were unable to score any hits.
- Erwin Rommel's forces attacked Ajdabiya and expelled the 2nd Armoured Division.
- Crown Prince and Regent of Iraq 'Abd al-Ilah fled to Jordan after learning of a plot to assassinate him.
- Germany and Yugoslavia severed diplomatic relations.
- Martin Harlinghausen was appointed chief of the newly created Fliegerführer Atlantik.
- The British light cruiser HMS Bonaventure was torpedoed and sunk south of Crete by the Italian submarine Ambra.
- German submarine U-331 was commissioned.
- The U.S. Supreme Court decided Cox v. New Hampshire.
- Born: Bonvi, comic book artist, in Emilia-Romagna, Italy (d. 1995); Graeme Edge, drummer, songwriter and member of The Moody Blues, in Rocester, Staffordshire, England (d. 2021)
