= HMS Kelly =

British ship

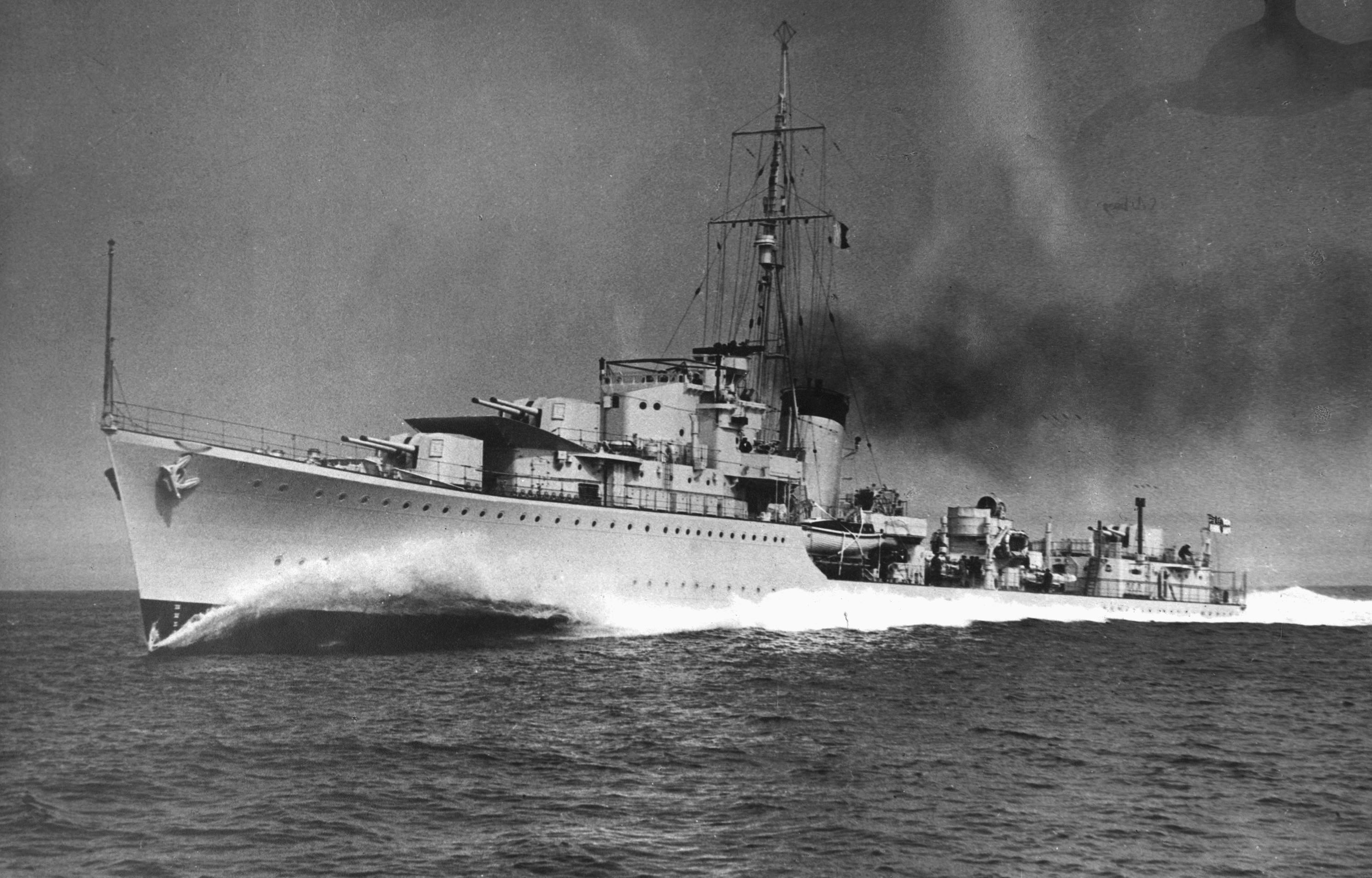
- HMS Kelly

History

United Kingdom
- Namesake: Admiral of the Fleet Sir John Kelly
- Ordered: 24 March 1937
- Builder: R&W Hawthorn, Leslie & Co. Ltd, Hebburn
- Yard number: 615
- Laid down: 26 August 1937
- Launched: 25 October 1938
- Commissioned: 23 August 1939
- Home port: HMNB Portsmouth
- Motto: Keep on instead of Hold on
- Fate: Sunk by Luftwaffe bombardment 23 May 1941, position 34°40′N 24°10′E

General characteristics
- Class & type: K-class destroyer
- Displacement: 1,760 tons; 2,400 tons full load
- Length: 339½ ft p/p; 356½ ft o/a
- Beam: 35¾ ft
- Draught: 9 ft (2.7 m) ; 12 ft (3.7 m) deep
- Propulsion: 2 Admiralty 3-drum water-tube boilers (300 psi, 620 °F), Parsons geared steam turbines on 2 shafts, 40,000 shp
- Speed: 36 knots (67 km/h) light; 32 knots (59 km/h) deep
- Range: 484 tons bunkerage, 5,500 nmi (10,200 km) at 15 knots (28 km/h), 1,050 nmi (1,940 km) at 32 knots (59 km/h)
- Complement: 218
- Armament: 3 × twin 4.7 in (120 mm) guns; 1 × quadruple 2 pdr (40 mm (1.6 in) AA guns; 2 × quadruple 0.5 in (12.7 mm) anti-aircraft machineguns; 2 × quintuple 21 in (533 mm) torpedo tubes; 1 × rack, 2 × throwers for depth charges

HMS Kelly (pennant number F01) was a K-class destroyer of the British Royal Navy, and flotilla leader of her class. She served through the early years of the Second World War; in Home Waters, off Norway and in the Mediterranean. Throughout her service, Kelly was commanded by Lord Louis Mountbatten, as commander (Captain (D)) of the 5th Destroyer Flotilla. She was lost in action in 1941 during the Battle of Crete.

Kelly was built by Hawthorn Leslie and Company at Hebburn on the River Tyne. She was laid down on 26 August 1937, launched on 25 October 1938 and commissioned on 23 August 1939, just 11 days before commencement of hostilities. She was named after Admiral of the Fleet Sir John Kelly.

== Service ==
=== Home Waters (1939) ===
On the outbreak of the Second World War in September 1939, the Duke and Duchess of Windsor were brought from France, where they were living, back to Britain on board HMS Kelly.

On the afternoon of 14 December 1939, the tanker Atheltemplar struck a mine laid by German destroyers off the Tyne Estuary. Kelly and the Tribal-class destroyer HMS Mohawk were dispatched as escorts for the rescue tugs Great Emperor, Joffre and Langton. During the operation, Kelly also struck a mine and sustained damage to her hull. While Mohawk put a party aboard Atheltemplar, and Joffre and Langton took the tanker under tow, Kelly herself was taken in tow by Great Emperor and returned to the Tyne. Reaching the Tyne just before midnight, Kelly was assisted upriver by the tugs Robert Redhead and Washington. She was towed to Hawthorn Leslie's yard for repairs, which took just a little over three months.

This was the second of Kelly's misfortunes, having just returned to active service after a month in dry dock following storm damage. Repairs were completed on 28 February 1940, and Kelly returned to the fray. Astonishingly, she was involved in a collision with HMS Gurkha just two days later on 2 March, necessitating a further 8 weeks in dry dock, this time on the Thames. She was released on 27 April, in time to assist with the evacuation of allied forces from Namsos.

=== Norwegian campaign (1940) ===
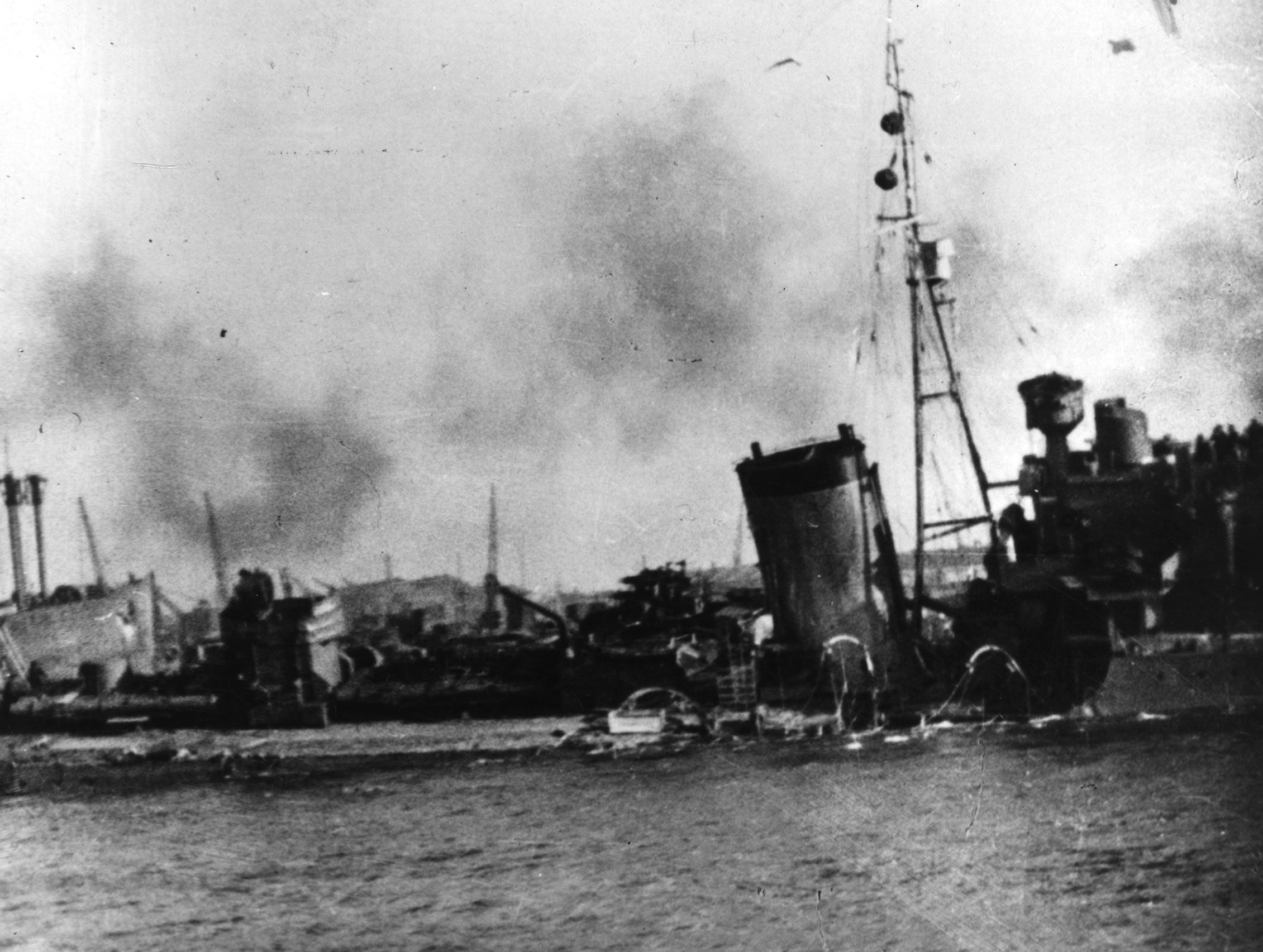
HMS Kelly returns to the Tyne after the torpedoing

On the night 9 May/10 May 1940, during the Battle of Norway, Kelly was torpedoed amidships by the German E-boat S 31, under command of Oberleutnant zur See Hermann Opdenhoff (for which action Oblt.z.S. Opdenhoff was awarded the Knight's Cross). Severely damaged, she was taken under tow by the tug Great Emperor and for four days she was attacked by E-boats and bombers as she struggled back to port at three knots. The Navy Controller wrote that she survived "not only by the good seamanship of the officers and men but also on account of the excellent workmanship which ensured the watertightness of the other compartments. A single defective rivet might have finished her." She was repaired and returned to service.

On return to Hebburn shipyard, she was de-commissioned before undergoing extensive repairs; she was not fit for active service until December 1940. Her bad luck had seen her on active service for less than two weeks over the previous 14 months.

During this period her captain, Louis Mountbatten, as Captain (D), was forced to lead his flotilla from temporary placement in other ships of the flotilla; for a time he led from HMS Javelin, until she too succumbed to damage.

Kelly re-joined 5th Flotilla after re-commissioning in December 1940; after working-up trials and some service in the Channel, she and 5th Flotilla sailed for the Mediterranean, arriving at Malta in April 1941.

=== Mediterranean (1941) ===
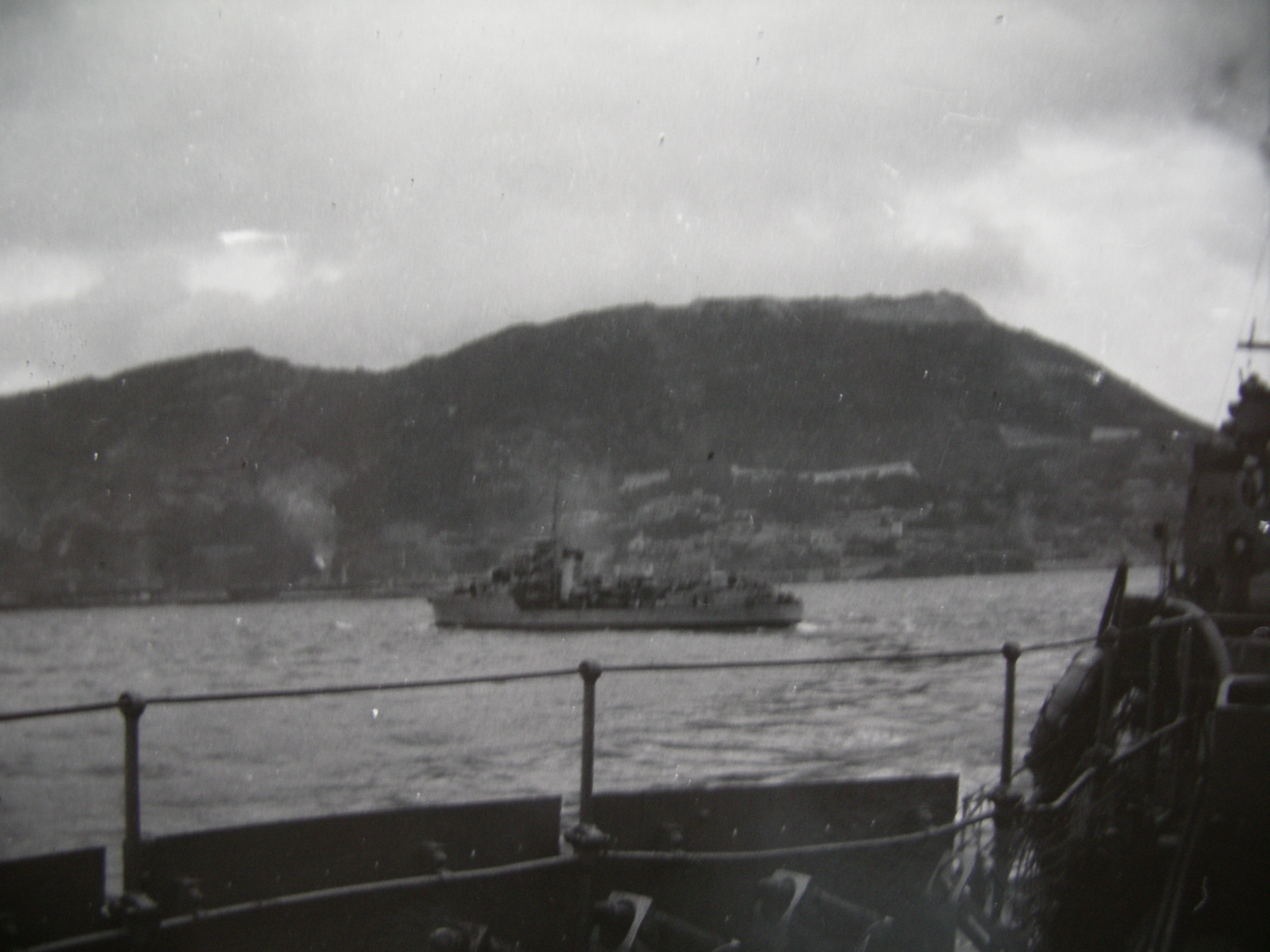
HMS Kelly at Gibraltar, April 1940

In April 1941 she joined HM ships Abdiel, Dido, Jackal, Jersey, Kashmir, Kelvin and Kipling at Gibraltar to form Force S, an escort for reinforcements to the Mediterranean Fleet (Operation Salient). She arrived in Malta on the 28th and was deployed with her flotilla to join Force K for attacks on Axis shipping to North Africa.

On 8 May, following the loss of HMS Jersey to a mine and the subsequent clearance of her wreck, the flotilla left Malta and joined Ajax, Dido, Orion and Perth to escort supply convoys to Egypt and Greece (Operation Tiger). On 10 May she led the destroyers to bombard Benghazi before returning to Malta. On 21 May she was despatched to Crete with Kashmir and Kipling and began patrols north of the island the next day.

On 23 May, during the evacuation of Crete, she was bombed and sunk, with half her crew killed. Kelly did succeed in shooting down three of the attacking Stukas, while another was badly damaged and crashed upon returning to base. The survivors were deeply affected by the loss of their ship; Mountbatten shared their loss and tried to console the ship's company by reminding them all that "we didn't leave the Kelly – the Kelly left us!"

== Legacy ==
The 1942 film In Which We Serve starring Noël Coward and John Mills and telling the story of "HMS Torrin", is based on the career of Kelly. The HMS Kelly Association hosts reunions and commemorations. Notable supporters of the association have included Charles III and Sir John Mills. In Hebburn, the town in South Tyneside where HMS Kelly was built, there remains a public house by the name of "The Kelly" while the local Tyne & Wear metro station features artwork depicting the ship herself.

== Battle Honours ==
- Atlantic (1939)
- Norway (1940)
- Mediterranean (1941)
- Crete (1941)

== Bibliography ==
- Colledge, J. J.; Warlow, Ben (2006) [1969]. Ships of the Royal Navy: The Complete Record of All Fighting Ships of the Royal Navy from the 15th Century to the Present (3rd Rev ed.). London: Chatham Publishing. ISBN 978-1-86176-281-8. OCLC 67375475.
- English, John (2001). Afridi to Nizam: British Fleet Destroyers 1937–43. Gravesend, Kent: World Ship Society. ISBN 0-905617-64-9.
- Friedman, Norman (2006). British Destroyers & Frigates: The Second World War and After. Annapolis, Maryland: Naval Institute Press. ISBN 1-86176-137-6.
- Haarr, Geirr H. (2010). The Battle for Norway: April–June 1940. Annapolis, MD: Naval Institute Press. ISBN 978-1-59114-051-1.
- Haarr, Geirr H. (2009). The German Invasion of Norway, April 1940. Annapolis, Maryland: Naval Institute Press. ISBN 978-1-59114-310-9.
- Langtree, Charles (2002). The Kelly's: British J, K, and N Class Destroyers of World War II. Annapolis, Maryland: Naval Institute Press. ISBN 1-55750-422-9.
- Lenton, H. T. (1998). British & Empire Warships of the Second World War. Annapolis, Maryland: Naval Institute Press. ISBN 1-55750-048-7.
- March, Edgar J. (1966). British Destroyers: A History of Development, 1892–1953; Drawn by Admiralty Permission From Official Records & Returns, Ships' Covers & Building Plans. London: Seeley Service. OCLC 164893555.
- Rohwer, Jürgen (2005). Chronology of the War at Sea 1939–1945: The Naval History of World War Two (Third Revised ed.). Annapolis, Maryland: Naval Institute Press. ISBN 1-59114-119-2.
- Whitley, M. J. (1988). Destroyers of World War 2. Annapolis, Maryland: Naval Institute Press. ISBN 0-87021-326-1.
