= HMS Jersey (F72) =

J-class destroyer of the Royal Navy

Coordinates: 35°54′N 14°31.4′E

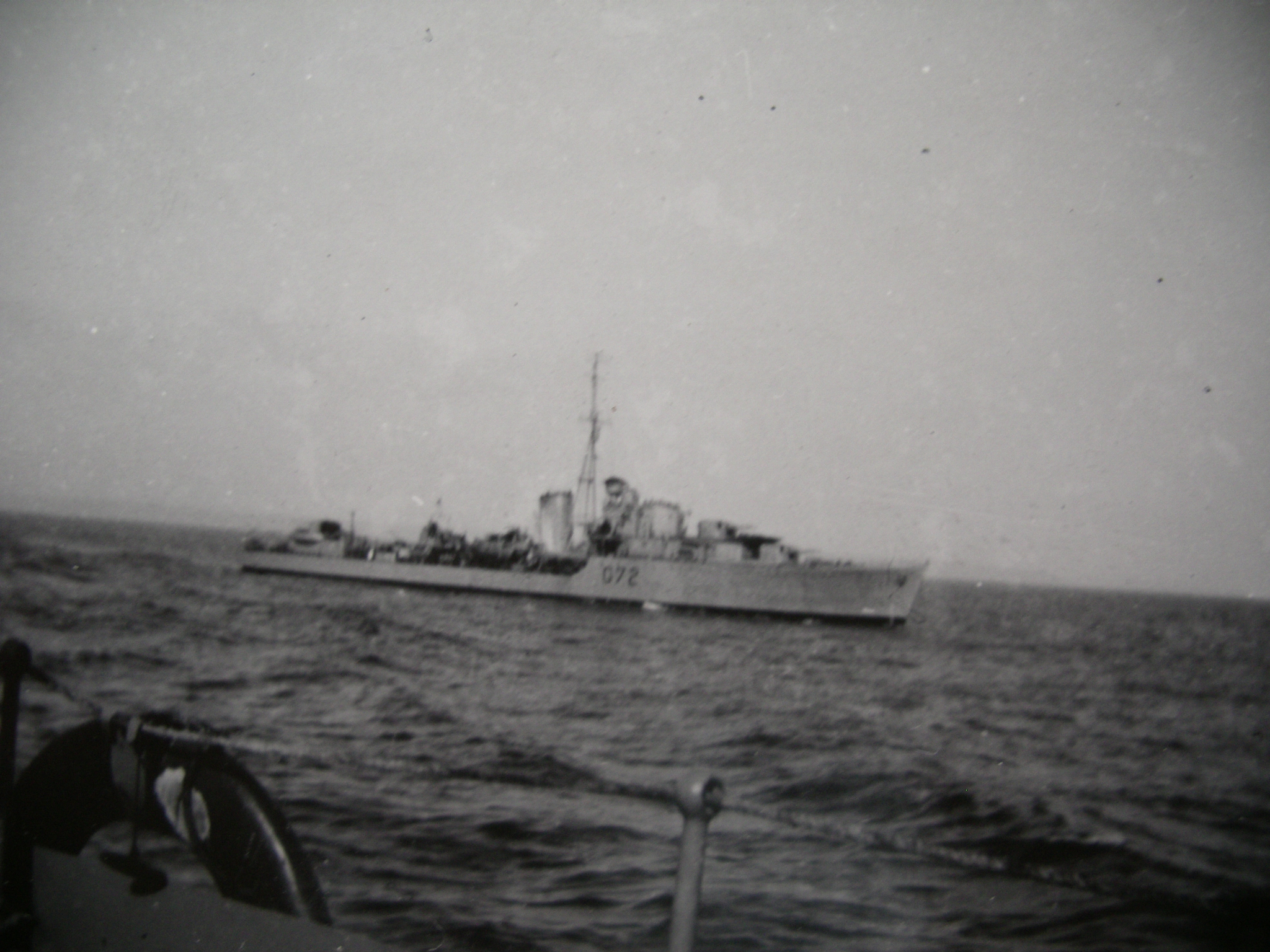
- Jersey after pennant change

History

United Kingdom
- Name: Jersey
- Namesake: Jersey
- Builder: J. Samuel White and Company
- Laid down: 20 September 1937
- Launched: 26 September 1938
- Commissioned: 28 April 1939
- Identification: Pennant number: F72
- Fate: Sunk, 2 May 1941

General characteristics (as built)
- Class & type: J-class destroyer
- Displacement: 1,690 long tons (1,720 t) (standard); 2,330 long tons (2,370 t) (deep load)
- Length: 356 ft 6 in (108.66 m) o/a
- Beam: 35 ft 9 in (10.90 m)
- Draught: 12 ft 6 in (3.81 m) (deep)
- Installed power: 44,000 shp (33,000 kW); 2 × Admiralty 3-drum boilers
- Propulsion: 2 × shafts; 2 × geared steam turbines
- Speed: 36 knots (67 km/h; 41 mph)
- Range: 5,500 nmi (10,200 km; 6,300 mi) at 15 knots (28 km/h; 17 mph)
- Complement: 183 (218 for flotilla leaders)
- Sensors & processing systems: ASDIC
- Armament: 3 × twin 4.7 in (120 mm) guns; 1 × quadruple 2 pdr (40 mm (1.6 in) AA guns; 2 × quadruple 0.5 in (12.7 mm) anti-aircraft machineguns; 2 × quintuple 21 in (533 mm) torpedo tubes; 1 × rack, 2 × throwers for depth charges

HMS Jersey was a J-class destroyer of the Royal Navy.

== Construction and career ==
On 25 March 1937, the British Admiralty placed orders for the eight destroyers of the J class, including one ship, Jersey to be built by J. Samuel White and Company at Cowes on the Isle of Wight. Jersey was laid down on 20 September 1937 and launched on 26 September 1938. Jersey was commissioned on 28 April 1939.

Following commissioning, Jersey worked up at Portland through to July 1939. On 12 August 1939, Jersey joined the Seventh Destroyer Flotilla of the Home Fleet, based at Scapa Flow in the Orkney Islands.

=== 7 December 1939 ===
Jersey was torpedoed off Haisborough Sands by the German destroyer Z12 Erich Giese, which was returning unseen from laying a minefield. Ten of the ship's company were killed and extensive damage caused. The ship's hull was repaired at the Henry Robb shipyard in Leith in around 25 days, but she had to return 24 hours after relaunch when the propeller became entangled in the defence nets around the harbour mouth. She was eventually relaunched safely on 30 December 1939.

Following further damage in 1940 Jersey was towed to the Humber for repairs and did not return to her flotilla until 28 October 1940.

=== 2 May 1941 ===
Jersey struck an Italian aircraft-dropped mine off Malta's Grand Harbour and sank next to the Grand Harbour breakwater. Thirty-five crew members were killed.

When Jersey sank it blocked the entrance to Malta's Grand Harbour, meaning movements into and out of the harbour were impossible for several days. The destroyers Kelly, Kelvin and Jackal were left marooned in the harbour until the wreck was cleared. Some of the ships that rescued the surviving crew had to take passage to Gibraltar. On 5 May the wreck broke into two sections. It was only after 1946 that the after section was cleared from the entrance, in a series of controlled demolitions carried out between 1946 and 1949. Further salvage and clearance work was done in 1968 to make the harbour safe for large vessels.

== About the wreck ==
- Ship sunk at: Valletta, Malta
- Position: 35° 54'N, 14° 30'E
- Depth (m.): 19 max. / 15.8 min.
- Orientation: 175°
