= Greek torpedo boat Proussa =

History

Greece
- Laid down: November 11, 1914
- Launched: March 8, 1916
- Acquired: 1919 as war reparation from Austria-Hungary
- Commissioned: 1919
- Decommissioned: April 4, 1941
- Fate: Sunk during World War II off Corfu

General characteristics
- Class & type: 250t-class torpedo boat
- Displacement: 243 tons standard
- Length: 57.76 m (189.5 ft)
- Beam: 5.8 m (19 ft)
- Draft: 1.5 m (4.9 ft)
- Propulsion: 2 Yarrow water-tube boilers; 2 AEG-Curtis steam turbines; 2 shafts; 5,000 / 6,000 shp
- Speed: 31 knots (57 km/h) maximum (32 knots (59 km/h) after 1925)
- Complement: 41
- Armament: 2 × Skoda 66 mm (2.6 in) / 30-cal guns; 1 × 8 mm anti-aircraft machine gun added in 1914; 4 × 450 mm torpedo tubes (2 × 2)

The Greek torpedo boat Proussa (Greek: TA Προύσσα) served in the Royal Hellenic Navy from 1919–1941. Originally the ship was the Austro-Hungarian Fiume-class torpedo boat SMS Tb 94-F. She was named for the ancient Greek city of Proussa (today known as Bursa) located in Anatolia; the city was part of the territory awarded to Greece for joining the side of the allied in the Treaty of Sèvres at the end of World War I.

The ship, along with two sister ships of Fiume-class torpedo boats Panormos and Pergamos was transferred to Greece as a war reparation from the Central Powers in 1919.

== Service in the Austro-Hungarian navy ==
In the build-up to the First World War, Austria-Hungary ordered four 250–tonne boats to be built at the Ganz & Co.– Danubius shipyard in 1912/13. The Navy asked for several improvements compared with the Trieste–class boats. Negotiations broke down in early December because of exaggerated prices requested by Danubius and were only resumed when pressured by the Hungarian Minister of Commerce. Danubius lowered its price by 10%. Finally Ganz & Co. – Danubius got orders for 16 torpedoboats in 1913, despite the fact that original plans had called for the Naval Arsenal Pola to build the Tb 86 to Tb 100 series. These ‘Fiume–boats’ were commissioned under the numbers Tb 82 F to Tb 97 F between August, 1914 and August, 1916. They differed from their Trieste sister–ships having two funnels and an extended forecastle.

== Service in the Hellenic navy ==
Proussa served in the Hellenic navy from 1919 until she was sunk by Italian Ju 87s at Corfu on April 4, 1941.

== See also ==
- History of the Hellenic Navy
