= Assault on Rutbah Fort (1941) =

- Part of the Anglo-Iraqi War
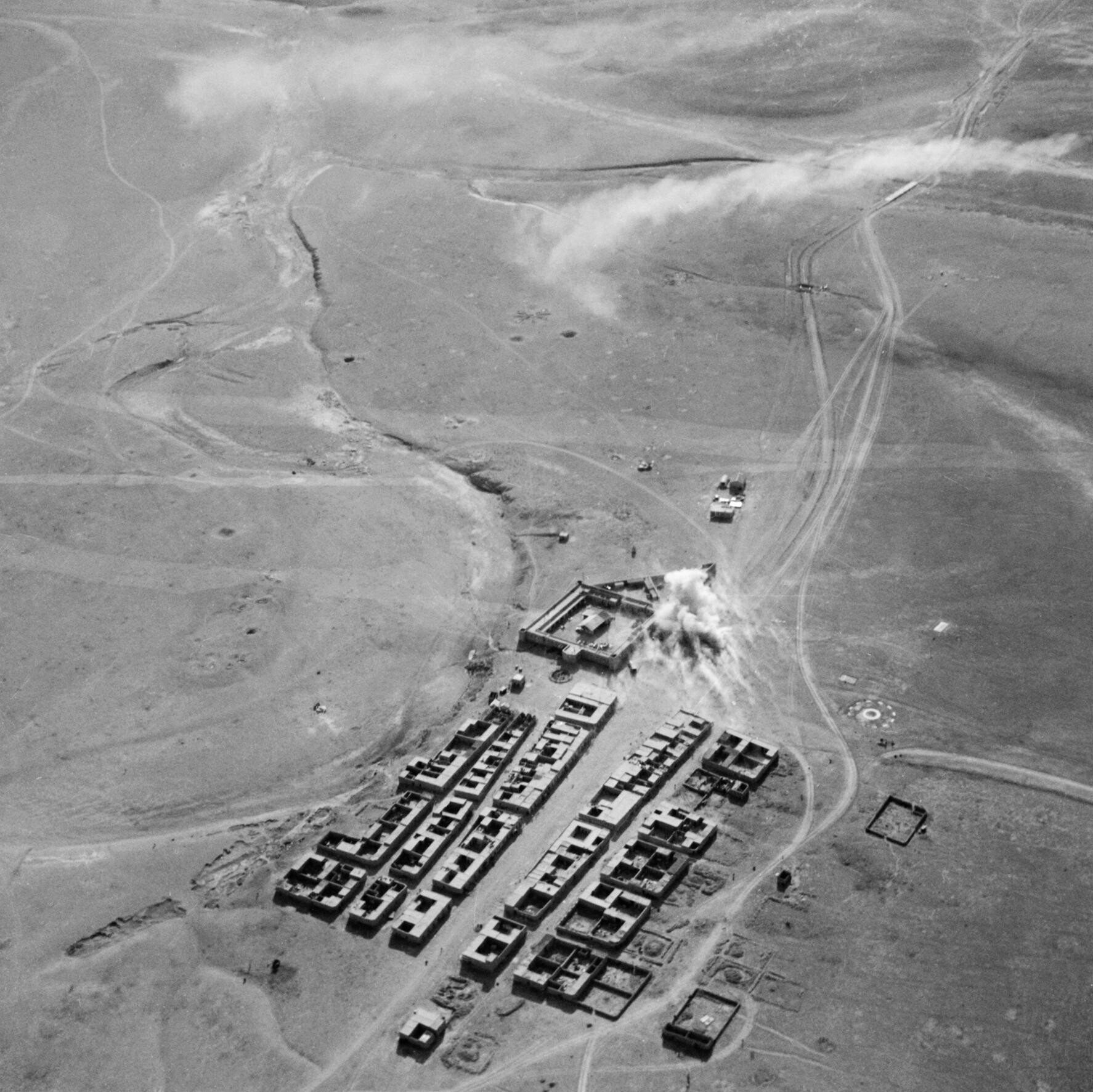
- An aerial photograph of the assault on Rutbah Fort
Date	8–11 May 1941
Location	Ar-Rutbah, Iraq 33.038277°N 40.286957°E
Result	British-Jordanian Victory

Belligerents
(Jordan) Transjordan; United Kingdom	Kingdom of Iraq

Commanders and leaders
(Jordan) Glubb Pasha (United Kingdom) Michael Casano	(Kingdom of Iraq) Fawzi al-Qawuqji

Units involved
Arab Legion; No. 2 Armoured Car Company RAF	al-Qawuqji's men Iraqi Desert Police

Strength
	100 policemen; 40 trucks
- Location within Iraq Assault on Rutbah Fort (1941) (Syria-Iraq-Lebanon)

The Assault on Rutbah Fort was fought during the Anglo-Iraqi War between British and Transjordanian forces and Iraqi forces loyal to Rashid Ali.

== Background ==
On 1 May 1941, forces loyal to Rashid Ali occupied the fort at Rutbah. An advanced party from Habforce was dispatched to combat them.

== Conflict ==
On 8 May 1941, a column of the Arab Legion, under Glubb Pasha, reached the fort at Rutbah. They picketed the ground surrounding the fort, to wait for the impending Royal Air Force bombardment. The fort was defended by approximately 100 policemen, the majority of which were Iraqi Desert Police. The H4-based Blenheims of No. 203 Squadron RAF arrived and bombed the fort, and thinking that the fort had surrendered, left. The fort did not surrender and the RAF returned twice that day to bomb the fort without success.

The next day, the RAF continued to bomb the fort at intermittent intervals. One plane sustained such heavy small-arms fire that it crashed on the way back to the airfield, killing the pilot. That evening, 40 trucks armed with machine guns arrived at the fort to reinforce the garrison. Half of the trucks were irregulars under the command of Fawzi al-Qawuqji and the other half were Iraqi Desert Police. Glubb decided to withdraw his soldiers back to H3 to await the reinforcement of the main column.

The Arab Legion arrived back at H3 on the morning of 10 May, and found No. 2 Armoured Car Company RAF under Squadron Leader Michael Casano waiting there. The squadron had been sent up ahead of the main column to assist the Arab Legion in taking Rutbah. Casano took his armoured cars to Rutbah whilst the Arab Legion replenished their supplies at H3. Casano's armoured cars fought an action against al-Qawuqji's trucks for most of the rest of the day, and although the result was not decisive the trucks retired to the east under the cover of dark to leave the garrison to its fate. That night the RAF succeeded in a night bombing, with several bombs landing inside the fort.

Following the withdrawal of al-Qawuqji's trucks and the successful bombing by the RAF, the garrison withdrew from the fort under the cover of dark. In the morning on the day of the 11 May, the Arab Legion column arrived and garrisoned the fort whilst Casson's armoured cars continued to fight remnants of the Iraqi Desert Police's forces. During the day, James Joseph Kingstone, the commander of Kingcol, along with some of his staff and a protective troop of the Blues and Royals and Life Guards, departed H3 for the fort at Rutbah. Leaving his protective troop at the edge of the town, Kingstone and Somerset de Chair, his assistant, proceeded on to the fort and met with Glubb Pasha.

== Aftermath ==
A film of the conflict was produced by British Pathé and published on 9 June 1941 as 'The War In Iraq'.

== Notes ==
=== Secondary Sources ===
- de Chair, Somerset (1943). The Golden Carpet (Second ed.). London: Faber and Faber.
- Glubb, John Bagot (1948). The Story of the Arab Legion. London: Hodder & Stoughton.
