= HMS Kelvin =

Destroyer of the Royal Navy

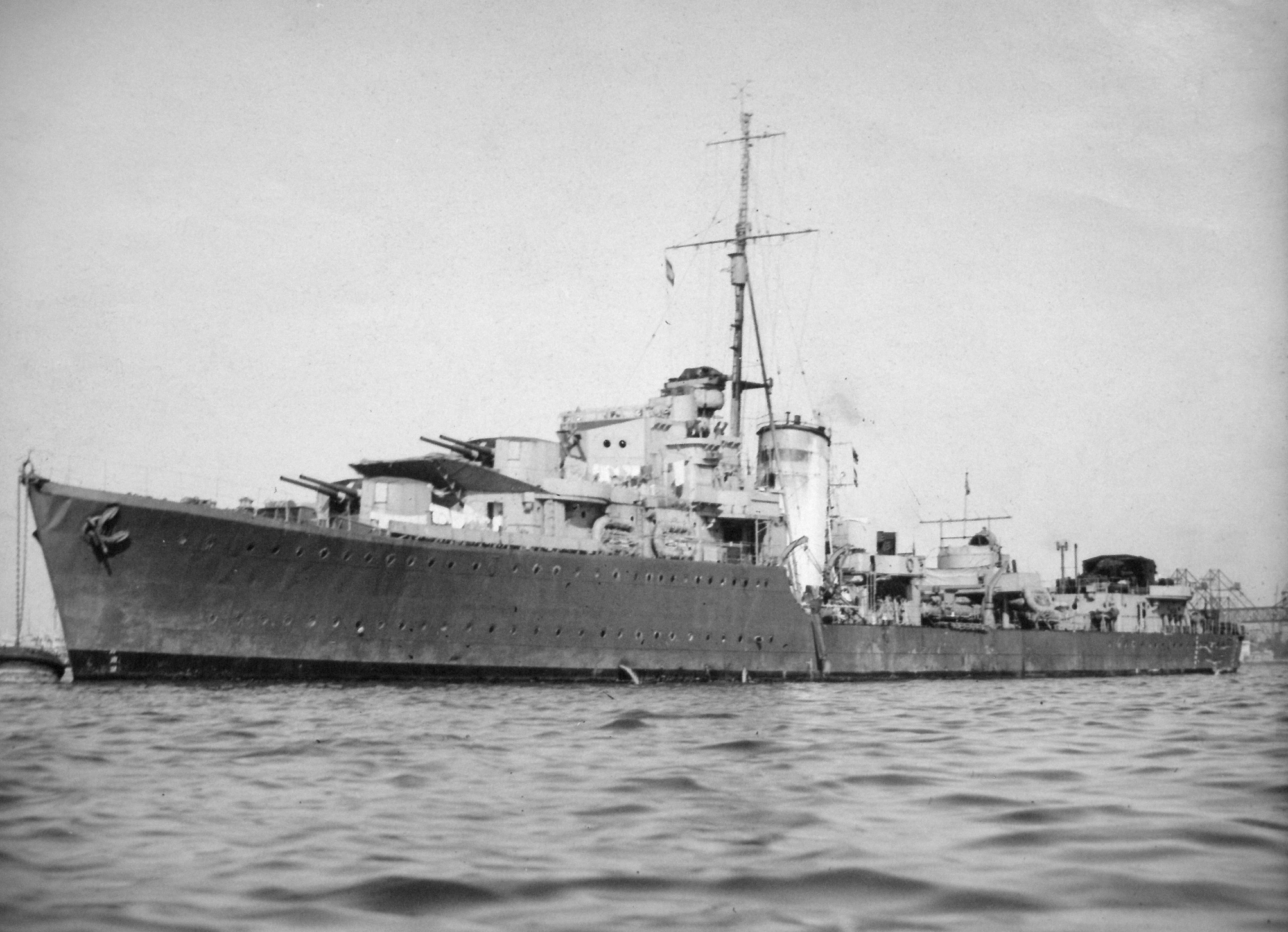
- HMS Kelvin

History

United Kingdom
- Name: HMS Kelvin
- Builder: Fairfield Shipbuilding and Engineering Company
- Laid down: 5 October 1937
- Launched: 19 January 1939
- Commissioned: 27 November 1939
- Identification: Pennant number: F37
- Fate: Sold for scrap, 6 April 1949

General characteristics (as built)
- Class & type: K-class destroyer
- Displacement: 1,690 long tons (1,720 t) (standard); 2,330 long tons (2,370 t) (deep load)
- Length: 356 ft 6 in (108.66 m) o/a
- Beam: 35 ft 9 in (10.90 m)
- Draught: 12 ft 6 in (3.81 m) (deep)
- Installed power: 44,000 shp (33,000 kW); 2 × Admiralty 3-drum boilers
- Propulsion: 2 × shafts; 2 × geared steam turbines
- Speed: 36 knots (67 km/h; 41 mph)
- Range: 5,500 nmi (10,200 km; 6,300 mi) at 15 knots (28 km/h; 17 mph)
- Complement: 183 (218 for flotilla leaders)
- Sensors & processing systems: ASDIC
- Armament: 3 × twin 4.7 in (120 mm) guns; 1 × quadruple 2 pdr (40 mm (1.6 in) AA guns; 2 × quadruple 0.5 in (12.7 mm) anti-aircraft machineguns; 2 × quintuple 21 in (533 mm) torpedo tubes; 1 × rack, 2 × throwers for depth charges

HMS Kelvin was a K-class destroyer of the Royal Navy laid down by the Fairfield Shipbuilding and Engineering Company, Limited, at Govan in Scotland on 5 October 1937, launched on 19 January 1939 and commissioned on 27 November 1939 with the pennant number F37.

== Service history ==
Kelvin fought in several theatres during the Second World War. In September 1940, as part of the 5th Destroyer Flotilla she scuttled HMS Ivanhoe, which had struck a mine off Texel during the Texel Disaster. In October, she was part of the escort for the battleship HMS Revenge when she shelled Cherbourg.

Under Admiral James Somerville, she was involved at the action off Cape Spartivento on 27 November 1940, and for the next two years she was busy in the Mediterranean Sea, being involved in many engagements.

In May 1941, she bombarded Benghazi in company with the destroyers Jackal, Kashmir, Kelly and Kipling before heading to Crete on 20 May 1941. She survived the withdrawal with comparatively light casualties, but required repairs and was sent to Bombay during which time her crew had sufficient time to tour India as far north as the Khyber Pass. By March 1942 she was back in the Mediterranean escorting convoy MW10 which took part in the Second Battle of Sirte. Later in the year she was involved in diversionary attacks in support of Operation Pedestal and bombarded Rhodes.

Winston Churchill on Kelvin, June 1944

On 16 April 1942, Kelvin landed troops from the 11th Battalion of the Royal Marines at Koufonisi near Crete to destroy a W/T station (Operation Lighter). In December, in company with Janus, Javelin and Jervis, she sank the Italian torpedo boat Lupo off Kerkennah Bank, Tunisia.

In January 1943, she bombarded Zuwara and in company with Nubian was responsible for sinking a variety of Italian supply ships and minesweepers. Then along with Javelin, Kelvin destroyed an Italian convoy on the night of 19 January 1943. Several members of her crew were decorated for their part in destroying enemy ships and aircraft in the Mediterranean.

She returned to the UK for refit in Chatham in July 1943, recommissioning in March 1944. In June 1944 she carried Winston Churchill and various other dignitaries across the English Channel during Operation Overlord. She returned to the Mediterranean and took part in operations to liberate the Dodecanese. She bombarded Tilos and landed a party of Special Boat Service troops in November 1944.

== Post-war fate ==
Unlike many of the other J-, K- and N-class destroyers, Kelvin survived the war and was sold for scrap on 6 April 1949 and broken up at Troon in Scotland.

== Battle honours ==
- Atlantic (1940)
- Spartivento (1940)
- Crete (1941)
- Mediterranean (1941–43)
- Sirte (1942)
- Malta Convoys (1942)
- Normandy (1944)
- Aegean (1944)
