= HMS Javelin =

Destroyer of the Royal Navy

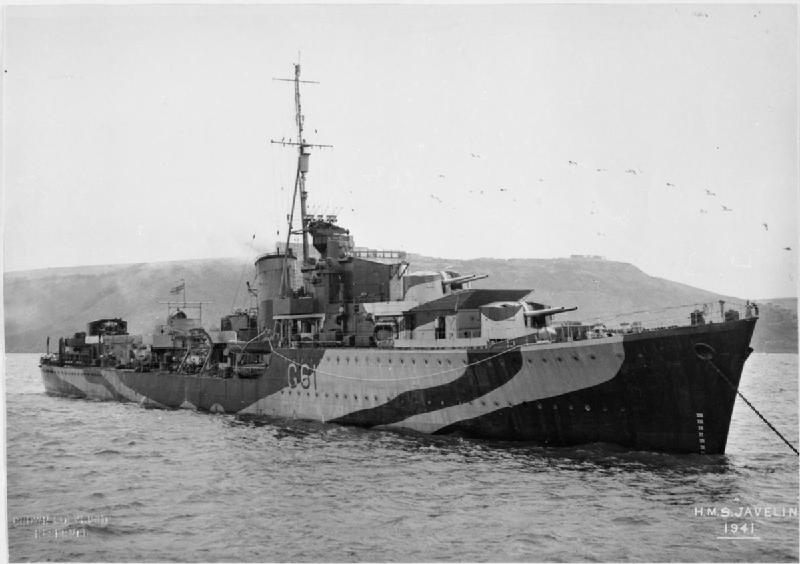
- Javelin at anchor, 1941

History

United Kingdom
- Name: Javelin
- Builder: John Brown and Company
- Laid down: 11 October 1937
- Launched: 21 December 1938
- Commissioned: 10 June 1939
- Identification: Pennant number: F61
- Fate: Sold for scrap, 11 June 1949

General characteristics (as built)
- Class & type: J-class destroyer
- Displacement: 1,690 long tons (1,720 t) (standard); 2,330 long tons (2,370 t) (deep load)
- Length: 356 ft 6 in (108.7 m) (o/a)
- Beam: 35 ft 9 in (10.9 m)
- Draught: 12 ft 6 in (3.8 m) (deep)
- Installed power: 44,000 shp (33,000 kW); 2 × Admiralty 3-drum boilers
- Propulsion: 2 × shafts; 2 × geared steam turbines
- Speed: 36 knots (67 km/h; 41 mph)
- Range: 5,500 nmi (10,200 km; 6,300 mi) at 15 knots (28 km/h; 17 mph)
- Complement: 183
- Sensors & processing systems: ASDIC
- Armament: 3 × twin 4.7 in (120 mm) guns; 1 × quadruple 2 pdr (40 mm (1.6 in) AA guns; 2 × quadruple 0.5 in (12.7 mm) anti-aircraft machineguns; 2 × quintuple 21 in (533 mm) torpedo tubes; 1 × rack, 2 × throwers for depth charges

HMS Javelin was a J-class destroyer of the Royal Navy.

== Construction and career ==
Javelin was laid down by John Brown and Company, Limited, at Clydebank in Scotland on 11 October 1937, launched on 21 December 1938, and commissioned on 10 June 1939 with the pennant number F61.

In May 1940, during Operation Dynamo, Javelin and other destroyers rescued survivors from the sinking of SS Abukir.

At the end of November 1940 the 5th Destroyer Flotilla, consisting of HMS Jupiter, Javelin, Jackal, Jersey, and Kashmir, under Captain Lord Louis Mountbatten, was operating off Plymouth, England. On 29 November the flotilla engaged the German destroyers Hans Lody, Richard Beitzen, and Karl Galster. Javelin, under command of A. F. Pugsley RN, was badly damaged by gunfire and torpedoes fired by the German destroyers, losing both her bow and her stern. Only 155 feet (47 m) of Javelin's original 353 ft (108 m) length remained afloat and she was towed back to harbour. Javelin was out of action for almost a year. A total of 45 officers and ratings were killed in this action.

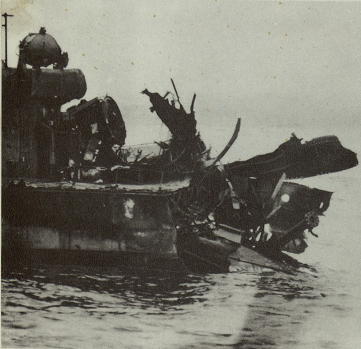
1940 photo of Javelin showing stern entirely blown off

Javelin participated in the Operation Ironclad assault on Madagascar in May 1942.

She participated in the failed Operation Vigorous attempt to deliver a supply convoy to Malta, in June 1942. Javelin along with HMS Kelvin destroyed a flotilla of Italian small ships on the night of 19 January 1943.

Javelin's record was marred on 17 October 1945 whilst off Rhodes by an outbreak of indiscipline (a refusal to work by “Hostilities Only” ratings following resentment over a return to pre-war spit-and-polish): one leading rating was charged with mutiny, and several ratings were subsequently court-martialled, though sentences were reduced as the facts became known.

Javelin was sold to the shipbreakers on 11 June 1949, and she was scrapped at Troon in Scotland.

== See also ==
- Henry Leach (navigating officer during mutiny; more details at Leach biographic article)
