= List of maritime disasters in World War II =

This is a list of naval vessels sunk or otherwise severely damaged with loss of life during the Second World War.

Year	Country	Description	Lives lost	Use	Image
1945	Germany	Wilhelm Gustloff – The German militarized KdF flagship sank after being hit by three torpedoes fired by the Soviet submarine S-13 on 30 January in the Baltic. The official death toll is 5,348, but it is estimated that up to 9,343 were killed, making it possibly the worst single-ship loss of life in history and the worst maritime ship disaster of WWII. Most of those killed were German civilians, military personnel, and Nazi officials being evacuated from East Prussia. It is estimated that between 650 and 1239 survivors were rescued.	9,343	Navy	
1945	Germany	Goya – The German Navy transport ship was torpedoed and sunk by the Soviet submarine L-3 on 16 April. An estimated 6,000–7,000 civilians and German troops died, 183 were rescued.	7,200 (estimated)	Navy	
1940	United Kingdom	HMT Lancastria – The worst single disaster in British maritime history sunk by German aircraft in June, with at least 6,000 deaths, but most likely up to 7,000, making it one of the worst maritime disasters in history. 2,477 survived with 1,738 known dead; 6,000 people are known to have boarded, but many boarded later, and a total of up to 9,500 has been proposed.	7,000 (estimated)	Navy	
1941	Soviet Union	Armenia – A hospital ship sunk on 7 November by German torpedo-carrying Heinkel He 111 aircraft. She was evacuating refugees, wounded military personnel, and staff from several of Crimea's hospitals. An estimated 7,000 people were killed, 2,000 of whom are believed to have been unregistered passengers, making it the worst maritime disaster in Soviet history. Eight survivors were rescued by an escort vessel.	5,000–7,000		
1945	Germany	Cap Arcona – On 3 May the prison ship, carrying concentration camp refugees, was attacked by the British Royal Air Force (RAF). The ship caught fire and capsized, leaving an estimated 4,800 - 7000 dead. The vast majority were concentration camp prisoners reported as on their way to Sweden but possibly to be drowned by scuttling the ships.	4,800–7,000		
1944	Japan	Junyō Maru – a Hell ship sunk by the Royal Navy submarine HMS Tradewind in September. 5,620 Dutch POWs and Javanese slave labourers died.	5,620		
1944	Japan	Toyama Maru – On 29 June the troopship, while carrying more than 6,000 men of the Japanese 44th Independent Mixed Brigade, was torpedoed and sunk by the submarine USS Sturgeon in the Nansei Shoto, off Taira Jima, Japan. There were about 600 survivors from the sinking.	5,400	Military	
1944	Japan	Ryūsei Maru – On 25 February the Japanese troop transport, while part of a convoy off Bali, was sunk by USS Rasher. About 4,998 people were killed.	4,998	Military	
1938	Taiwan	Yu Xing – On 22 October, the merchant ship was evacuating more than 5,000 officers and soldiers from various institutions in Wuhan. While on route to its destination, the ship was attacked by Japanese aircraft near Banzhouwan, Jiayu County, and quickly sunk. There were only more than 200 survivors.	4,800+	Military	
1944	Japan	Tamatsu Maru – On 19 August, as part of convoy HI-71, the Japanese landing ship was torpedoed and sunk by USS Spadefish. After two torpedoes hit the ship she capsized and sank with between 4,406 and 4,755 men killed.	4,406–4,755	Military	
1944	Germany	Oria – On the night of 12 February, while carrying Germany's flag, 4,096 Italian POWs (after Italy left the Axis), from the Dodecanese to Athens, Oria entered a thunderstorm some 50 mi (80 km) from her intended destination, Piraeus harbor. The ship cracked and sank; 4,025 Italians, 44 German soldiers (guards) and five crew, an estimated 4,074 were killed. 28 people were saved.	4,074	Navy	
1941	Soviet Union	Iosif Stalin – On 3 December, struck three mines with 5,589 people aboard near Hanko in the Baltic Sea. While the crew tried to repair the ship, Finnish coastal artillery opened fire and Iosif Stalin took a hit aft from a 12 in (305 mm) shell, which caused a large explosion in the ammunition storage. 1,740 were rescued from the sinking ship by the escorting minesweepers, (Nos. 205, 211, 215 and 217) and a further five patrol boats from the convoy escort. The ship ran aground and German forces captured 3000 survivors.	850 (3,000 captured)	Navy	
1945	Germany	Steuben – The ocean liner converted into a military transport was torpedoed and sunk on 10 February by Soviet submarine S-13. A total of 3,608–4,550 died out of the 4,267–5,200 people aboard.	3,608–4,550	Military	
1944	Japan	Mayasan Maru – On 17 August the Japanese landing ship, as part of Convoy Hi-81, was torpedoed by USS Picuda and sank in two and a half minutes taking with her 3,536 men. The escort ships rescued about 1,300 men.	3,356	Military	
1944	Japan	Nikkin Maru – On 30 June, the unescorted troopship, travelling from Korea to Japan, was torpedoed and sunk in the Yellow Sea by USS Tang with the loss of 3,219 lives and probably no survivors.	3,219	Military	
1944	Japan	Tango Maru – On 25 February the Japanese prisoner transport ship, often referred to as a hell ship, was traveling between Java and Ambon while crammed with 3,500 Javanese labourers (romusha) and hundreds of Allied POWs. The US submarine USS Rasher sank the ship with three torpedo hits. About 500 Javanese survived the sinking. On the same day Rasher also sank Ryūsei Maru killing some 5,000 Japanese soldiers.	3,000	Military	
1944	Japan	Lima Maru – The Japanese troopship was torpedoed and sunk southeast of the Gotō Islands by the American submarine USS Snook on 8 February. The ship sank quickly and as many as 2,765 lives were lost.	2,765	Military	
1945	Germany	Thielbek – sunk by British planes on 3 May, along with the Cap Arcona, killing 2,750 people.	2,750	Navy	
1944	Germany	Moero – A ship carrying mainly refugees from Tallinn escaping the Soviet occupation of Estonia was sunk by Soviet airplanes in the Baltic Sea on 22 September. Of approximately 3,350 people on the ship, only 650 survived.	2,700	Navy	
1944	Germany	Petrella – A German steamship (former Italian Capo Pino) torpedoed by the submarine HMS Sportsman on 8 February, while transporting 3,173 Italian POWs from Crete to the mainland. 2,670 POWs were killed.	2,670	Navy	
1944	Japan	Yoshida Maru No. 1 – In April, she departed Shanghai as part of the Take Ichi convoy carrying a full Japanese regiment of the 32nd Infantry Division. On 26 April she was spotted and sunk by the submarine USS Jack. There were no survivors from the 2,586 soldiers, 81 ship's crew, and 2 armed guards aboard at the time of sinking.	2,669	Military	
1944	Japan	Teia Maru – On 18 August the passenger liner was torpedoed and sunk by US submarine USS Rasher near the Philippines. In all 2,665 Japanese soldiers and passengers aboard were killed.	2,665	Military	
1944	Norway	Rigel – In November, Rigel and Korsnes, escorted by two German naval vessels, were bombed by Fairey Barracuda bombers. The official number of casualties is 2,572, mostly Soviet (2,248), Polish and Serbian prisoners of war. Seven Norwegians were also killed.	2,572	Military	
1941	Soviet Union	Lenin – On 27 July, the cargo liner was lost in the Black Sea between Sevastopol and Yalta. Minimally 49 crewmen and 900, possibly as many as 4,600, passengers killed. 45 crewmen and 600 passengers were rescued.	2,500 (950–4,600)	Civilian	
1945	Japan	Yamato – The largest battleship ever built, she was sunk on 7 April by torpedo planes from the aircraft carrier USS Hornet and others. 280 of Yamato's 2,778 crew were rescued. This was the greatest loss of life in a single warship in World War II.	2,498	Navy	
1944	Japan	Yoshino Maru – The Japanese troopship, sailing to Borneo in Convoy MI-11, was torpedoed and sunk 280 nautical miles (520 km) north-north west of Cape Mayraira, Luzon by USS Parche	2,495	Military	
1944	Japan	Sakito Maru – The Japanese troopship, bound for Guam, was torpedoed and sunk in the East China Sea by USS Trout on 29 February.	2,475	Military	
1945	Japan	Hisagawa Maru – On 9 January, the cargo ship was bombed and sunk by United States Navy aircraft. A total of 2,117 troops, 84 gunners, and all 84 crewmen were killed.	2,285	Military	
1944	Japan	Hawaii Maru – As part of Convoy MI-29, the Hawaii Maru-class transport was torpedoed and sunk on 2 December in the East China Sea west of Yakushima Island (30°24′N 128°17′E) by USS Sea Devil. Lost with all hands, 1,843 troops of the Imperial Japanese Army 23rd Infantry Division, 60 other troops, 83 gunners and 148 crewmen were killed.	2,134	Military	
1944	Japan	Edogawa Maru – As part of Convoy MI-27, troopship was torpedoed and damaged in the Yellow Sea off Cheju Island, Korea by USS Sunfish on 17 November. She was torpedoed again by USS Sunfish the next morning and sunk with the loss of 1,998 troops and 116 crewmen	2,114	Military	
1943	Germany	Sinfra – On 20 October the cargo ship, a French ship confiscated by the Germans, was sunk by Allied aircraft while transporting POWs. There were 2,460 prisoners (2,389 Italians, 71 Greek) crammed in the cargo hold of the ship to be transported to the Greek mainland along with 204 Germans. At Suda Bay the ship was attacked by United States Army Air Forces B-25 Mitchells and RAF Bristol Beaufighters. An estimated 2,098 POWs drowned.	2,098	Military	
1944	Japan	Akitsu Maru – On 15 November the Japanese landing craft carrier was sunk by the submarine USS Queenfish at the southern entrance of Tsushima Strait 60 miles east of Saishu Island. Some 2,046 men, mainly of the Imperial Japanese Army's 64th Infantry Regiment, were killed.	2,046	Military	
1943	Japan	Kamakura Maru – On 28 April the combination troop transport and hospital ship, while sailing from Manila to Singapore and carrying some 2,500 soldiers along with civilians, was torpedoed by the US submarine USS Gudgeon. The ship was hit by two torpedoes and sank within 12 minutes. Four days later 465 survivors were rescued from the sea by Japanese ships with some 2,035 people being killed.	2,035	Military	
1945	Japan	Awa Maru – On 1 April, the cargo and passenger ship was intercepted and sunk in the Taiwan Strait by the U.S. submarine USS Queenfish which mistook her for a destroyer. One person of the 2,004 aboard survived.	2,003	Navy	
1941	Germany	Bismarck – After being hunted by British forces following the sinking of HMS Hood, Bismarck was herself sunk three days later on 27 May. Of the more than 2,200 crew aboard, over 2,000 were killed, 114 survived.	2,000+	Navy	
1944	Japan	Ural Maru – On 27 September the Japanese transport and hospital ship was torpedoed in the South China Sea and sunk by the US submarine USS Flasher about 240 kilometres (150 mi) west of Luzon. An estimated 2,000 were killed.	2,000	Military	
1943	Germany	Scharnhorst – Lost in the Battle of North Cape on 26 December, being outgunned by HMS Duke of York, and later finished off by British destroyers; 1,932 killed, 36 survived.	1,932	Navy	
1943	Japan	Teiyo Maru – On 3 March, the transport was bombed and sunk by American and Australian aircraft south-east of Finschhafen, New Guinea during the Battle of the Bismarck Sea(06°56′S 148°16′E). Her commanding officer, seventeen crewmen and 1,880 troops were killed.	1,915	Military	
1943	Italy	Gaetano Donizetti – An Italian motor passenger ship in German control, she was attacked and shelled by the destroyer HMS Eclipse on 23 September, while carrying 1,584 to 1,835 Italian POWs captured by the Germans in Rhodes in addition to 220 German guards and crew. The ship capsized and sank quickly, leaving no survivors.	1,800+	Military	
1944	Japan	Arisan Maru – On 24 October one of Japan's hell ships, was transporting 1,781 US and Allied POWs and Japanese civilians when she was hit by a torpedo from a US submarine. It is not known whether it was USS Shark or USS Snook. Nine of the prisoners aboard survived.	1,772	Military	
1942	United Kingdom	RMS Laconia – On 12 September, 130 mi (210 km) north-northeast of Ascension Island, Laconia was hit and sunk by a torpedo fired by U-156. The U-boat commander ordered a rescue effort after discovering the survivors included hundreds of Italian POWs. Despite this, an estimated 1,658 persons were killed. An American bomber attacked U-156 despite observing the survivors aboard in what came to be called the Laconia incident, which led to Admiral Karl Dönitz's Laconia Order regarding assistance to the survivors of sinking ships.	1,658	Military	
1944	Japan	Taihō – On 19 June, in the Battle of the Philippine Sea, the Japanese aircraft carrier sank some six and a half hours after suffering a single torpedo hit from the US submarine USS Albacore. A combination of the torpedo hit along with a pair of explosions that resulted from design flaws and poor damage control procedures doomed the ship. Out of a complement of 2,150, some 1,650 officers and men were killed.	1,650	Navy	
1940	United Kingdom	HMS Glorious – The aircraft carrier, with escorting destroyers HMS Ardent and HMS Acasta, were sunk by the German battleships Scharnhorst and Gneisenau off Norway, 8 June. 1,515 men died; 46 survived.	1,515	Navy	
1944	Japan	Tsushima Maru – On 22 August the passenger/cargo ship, while carrying hundreds of schoolchildren from Okinawa to Kagoshima as part of a convoy, was torpedoed and sunk by USS Bowfin close to the island of Akusekijima. A total of 1,508, including 767 schoolchildren, were killed and 177, including 59 schoolchildren, survived the sinking.	1,508	Civilian	
1944	Japan	Chiyoda – sunk with her entire crew of around 1,470, possibly the largest vessel to be lost with all hands in World War II.	1,470	Navy	
1941	United Kingdom	HMS Hood – The battlecruiser was attacked and sunk by the German battleship Bismarck on 24 May. Of the 1,418 crew aboard, three survived.	1,415	Navy	
1944	Japan	Fusō – Sank on 25 October as a result of torpedoes launched by USS Melvin in the Battle of Surigao Strait, causing the loss of possibly all of her crew of between 1,400 and 1,600.	1,400–1,600	Navy	
1944	Japan	Chikuma – sunk by US airplanes during the Battle off Samar on 25 October. Only one survivor.	1,400	Navy	
1944	Japan	Shinano – Meant to be the third Yamato-class battleship, but completed as an aircraft carrier instead, she was sunk on 29 November by the US submarine USS Archer-Fish killing of 1,400 of her crew and shipbuilding workers, as she had not yet been completely outfitted for duty, and had been commissioned ten days before her sinking. Shinano is the largest-ever warship ever sunk solely by a submarine in naval history.	1,435	Navy	
1943	Japan	Tatsuta Maru – On 8 February the Japanese troopship was torpedoed and sunk by the USS Tarpon 42 miles east of Mikurajima. Some 1,223 passengers and 198 crew members aboard were killed.	1,421	Military	
1943	Italy	Roma – Hit by two German Fritz X guided bombs on 9 September, while proceeding from La Spezia toward Malta, in accordance with the terms of the Allied-Italian armistice. Of her crew of 2,015, 622 survived; 1,393 died.	1,393	Navy	
1944	Japan	Yamashiro – The battleship, sister ship of Fusō, was also sunk in the Battle of Surigao Strait, with about 10 survivors out of 1,400.	1,390	Navy	
1944	Japan	Fuso Maru – On 31 July the Japanese troopship was torpedoed and sunk by USS Steelhead in the South China Sea 280 nmi (519 km) northwest of Cape Mayraira, Luzon, the Philippines, while she was travelling in Convoy MI-11 from Moji, Japan, to Miri, Borneo. 1,384 Japanese soldiers aboard were killed.	1,384	Military	
1944	Japan	Akagi Maru – On 17 February, during Operation Hailstorm, the armed merchant cruiser was bombed and damaged at Truk (07°50′N 151°25′E) by United States Navy aircraft and was consequently scuttled. A total of 512 passengers and 788 sailors were lost.	1,309	Military	
1943	Italy	Mario Roselli – An Italian cargo ship, captured by the German, which was sunk in Corfu Bay by an Allied bomber on 10 October, killing 1,302 Italian POWs out of 5,500 aboard.	1,302	Military	
1944	Egypt	Khedive Ismail, an Egyptian-owned, UK-requisitioned troopship in a convoy from Mombasa to Colombo, was torpedoed by the Japanese submarine I-27 on 12 February. Of the 1,507 people aboard, 1,302 were killed, including 79 of the 87 women. Some survivors in the water were killed when the destroyer escorts dropped depth charges to bring the submarine to the surface. It remains the worst disaster involving merchant navy women.	1,302	Military	
1945	Japan	Ashigara – On 8 June the Japanese cruiser left Batavia for Singapore with 1,600 troops aboard escorted by the destroyer Kamikaze. In the Bangka Strait the two ships were attacked by the Allied submarines USS Blueback, HMS Trenchant and HMS Stygian. Kamikaze attacked Trenchant with gunfire forcing her to submerge and then with depth charges, but Trenchant fired eight torpedoes at Ashigara. Ashigara was hit five times and capsized Kamikaze rescued 400 troops and 853 crew.	1,300	Navy	
1941	Italy	Conte Rosso – was used as a troopship by the Italian Government until 24 May, when she was torpedoed and sunk by HMS Upholder (P37). The sinking occurred 8.6 nautical miles (16 km) off the coast of Sicily while in convoy from Naples to Tripoli. Of the 2,729 soldiers and crew aboard, 1,297 were killed.	1,297	Military	
1944	Japan	Shōkaku – On 19 June, in the Battle of the Philippine Sea, the Japanese aircraft carrier was sunk after being struck by three to four torpedoes launched by the US submarine USS Cavalla followed by an aerial bomb that detonated aviation fuel vapors that had permeated the ship. She sank quickly taking 1,272 with her while 570 were rescued.	1,272	Navy	
1943	Japan	Chūyō – On 4 December the Japanese aircraft carrier was torpedoed and sunk by the US submarine USS Sailfish close to the island of Hachijōjima. After being hit four times in two hours Chūyō sank quickly killing about 1,250 people including 20 of the 21 prisoners captured from US submarine USS Sculpin.	1,250	Navy	
1944	Japan	Unryū – On 19 December the Japanese aircraft carrier was torpedoed and sunk by the submarine USS Redfish in the East China Sea. 1,239 were killed; one officer and 146 men survived and were rescued by the Japanese destroyer Shigure.	1,239	Navy	
1943	Japan	Oigawa Maru – On 3 March, the transport was bombed and damaged by American and Australian aircraft south-east of Finschhafen, New Guinea (06°56′S 148°16′E) during the Battle of the Bismarck Sea. She was finished off that night by PT-143 and PT-150. Seventy-eight crewmen and 1,151 troops were killed.	1,229	Military	
1944	Germany	Tirpitz – The battleship was attacked by Royal Air Force Lancaster bombers from 9 and 617 Squadrons armed with Tallboy bombs on 12 November during Operation Catechism. The battleship sank west of Tromsø, Norway, killing between 950 and 1,204 of her crew.	950–1,204	Navy	
1944	Japan	Kongō – Sunk with torpedoes by the submarine USS Sealion II on 21 November in the Formosa Strait with the loss of 1,200 of her crew.	1,200	Navy	
1944	Japan	Yasukuni Maru – On 31 January the Japanese auxiliary submarine tender, about 17 miles (27 km) northwest of Truk, was attacked by the US submarine USS Trigger and was hit by two torpedoes. She took on water rapidly and sank within five minutes with loss of 300 crew and 888 technicians. The escorting Japanese destroyer Shiratsuyu rescued 43 survivors.	1,188	Military	
1941	United States	USS Arizona – While docked in Pearl Harbor, the super-dreadnought battleship was attacked by Japanese torpedo and dive bombers on 7 December. 1,177 crew were killed out of a complement of 1,400. The wreck remains on the bottom of the harbor as a monument to all those who died that day.	1,177	Navy	
1944	Japan	Rakuyo Maru – On 12 September the Japanese troopship, while part of Convoy HI-72 and transporting 1,317 Australian and British POWs from Singapore, was torpedoed and sunk in the Luzon Strait by USS Sealion. 1,159 POWs were killed. On 15 September Sealion and other submarines who had taken part in the attack returned to the area and rescued 63 surviving POWs, but four died before they could be landed at Tanapag Harbor, Saipan in the Mariana Islands.	1,159	Military	
1943	United Kingdom	HMT Rohna – sunk on 26 November in the Mediterranean by a Henschel Hs 293 glide bomb from a Luftwaffe aircraft. An estimated 1,138 deaths, 1,015 of them US soldiers, constitutes the largest loss of US soldiers at sea.	1,138	Military	
1944	Japan	Shin'yō – On 17 November the Japanese aircraft carrier, en route to Singapore, was torpedoed and sunk by the US submarine USS Spadefish. As many as four torpedoes hit the ship and detonated her aviation fuel tanks. The resulting explosion destroyed the ship and killed 1,130 while 70 were rescued.	1,130	Navy	
1942	Japan	Montevideo Maru – On 22 June, after the fall of Rabaul, Papua New Guinea the Japanese ordered 845 Australian POWs (prisoners of war) and 208 civilian internees to board the unmarked Japanese ship for transport to Japan. On 1 July the US submarine USS Sturgeon attacked and sank the ship near the northern Philippine coast. Of the 1,140 people aboard, including 88 crew, reportedly 18 survived.	1,122	Military	
1943	Japan	Mutsu – On 8 June, while at Hashirajima fleet anchorage, the Japanese battleship suffered an internal explosion and sank. At the time 113 flying cadets and 40 instructors from the Tsuchiura Naval Air Group were aboard for familiarization. The magazine of her No. 3 turret exploded destroying the adjacent structure of the ship and cutting her in half. A massive influx of water into the machinery spaces caused the 150-meter (490 ft) forward section of the ship to capsize starboard and sink almost immediately. The 45-meter (148 ft) stern section upended and floated until about 02:00 hrs on 9 June before sinking a few hundred feet south of the main wreck. Of 1,474 crew and visitors aboard, 1,121 were killed in the explosion.	1,121	Navy	
1943	Japan	Nisshin – On 22 July, Nisshin transported 630 soldiers, 22 light tanks, ammunition and food supplies from Yokosuka to Bougainville Island. The convoy was attacked by three waves of American bombers, and Nisshin was hit by four 227-kilogram and two 454-kilogram bombs, which exploded her aviation fuel stores and which caused many casualties among the crowded soldiers. Nisshin sank some fourteen minutes after the start of the air raid. Of the 1263 on board at the time (633 crewmen and 630 embarked troops), only 178 were rescued by the escorting destroyers.	1,085	Navy	
1944	Japan	Hōfuku Maru – On 20 September the Japanese cargo ship, while transporting POWs, and 10 other ships formed Convoy MATA-27 sailing from Manila to Japan. The following morning the convoy was attacked 80 nautical miles (150 km) north of Corregidor by more than 100 US carrier planes. All 11 ships in the convoy were sunk. Of those on board, 1,047 of the 1,289 British and Dutch POWs aboard died.	1,047	Military	
1944	Japan	Musashi – Sister ship of Yamato, sunk by US aircraft on 24 October in the Battle of Leyte Gulf, with a loss of 1,023 of her crew of 2,399.	1,023	Navy	
1942	Germany	Palatia – On 21 October, while transporting POWs to Norway, the German ship was sunk off the Norwegian coast by a RAF aircraft. 78 prisoners and 108 Germans survived the sinking; 986 people, including 915 prisoners from the Soviet Union or Eastern Europe, were killed.	986	Navy	
1942	Italy	Galilea – On 28 March the Italian troop transport, while carrying Alpini of the Julia Division from Patras to Bari, was torpedoed by HMS Proteus and sank in five hours. 279 Italians were rescued out of 1,314 aboard.	1,050	Military	
1938	Taiwan	Xiang Yang – On 23 October, the steamer was sunk by Japanese aircraft at Chenglingji. Sources vary for the number of victims, ranging from more than 1,000 passengers killed to only more than 100 survivors out of more than 5,000 passengers.	1,000–4,900+	Civilian	
1940	France	Bretagne – The super-dreadnought battleship and pride of the French navy, exploded and sank on 3 July in the Battle of Mers-el-Kébir as a result of gunfire from the British warships Hood, Valiant, and Resolution; 977 men were killed.	977	Navy	
1945	Germany	Karlsruhe – sunk by Soviet planes on 13 April, killing 970 people. 113 or 150 survivors.	970	Civilian	
1944	Japan	Aikoku Maru – On 17 February, while loading troops and supplies at Truk in Operation Hailstone, the Japanese armed merchant cruiser was sunk by Allied aircraft. The first bomb exploded in the officer's wardroom causing a fire and was followed by three more hits. In a second attack she was hit by a torpedo which detonated the ammunition in her number one hold and the explosion sheared off the bow. Aikoku Maru sank in two minutes, killing 945 crew and passengers.	945	Navy	
1941	United States	Corregidor – On 17 December, while loaded with about 1,200 passengers fleeing Manila, Corregidor was sunk by a mine off Corregidor. Corregidor had been the Royal Navy seaplane tender HMS Engadine and had returned to passenger service following WWI. Of 1,200 people aboard, 925 were killed and 275 rescued.	925	Civilian	
1941	United Kingdom/ Netherlands	HMS Wryneck & HMS Diamond – On 27 April, in the Battle of Greece, the two destroyers went to rescue survivors from the Dutch troopship Slamat which had been disabled in air attacks. After picking up 700 crew and troops the two ships came under sustained air attack from Ju 87 Stukas of JG 77. Wryneck and Diamond were both sunk about 20 nautical miles (37 km) east of Cape Maleas, Greece. Of the 983 men from all three ships, 66 survived.	917	Navy	
1944	Japan	Chitose – On 25 October, in the Battle of Leyte Gulf, the Japanese aircraft carrier was torpedoed and sunk. She was hit by three torpedoes, rolled over to port and nosed under, with the loss of 903 men and 601 rescued.	903	Navy	
1942	United Kingdom	Shuntien was sunk on 23 December off the coast of Cyrenaica, Libya by U-559 while carrying Italian and German prisoners of war. HMS Salvia and HMS Heythrop rescued survivors, but most were aboard Salvia which was sunk a few hours later with the loss of all aboard.	800–1,000	Military	
1945	United States	USS Indianapolis – The heavy cruiser was sunk by the Japanese submarine I-58 on 30 July while sailing to the Philippines from Guam, after delivering components for the Little Boy Hiroshima atomic bomb. Of the 1,196 sailors, 300 were killed aboard and 317 rescued. Others died from exposure and shark attacks (reported to be the third largest number in history, after the sinking of the HMT Nova Scotia, and the HMT Laconia). Survivors floated, some just in life jackets, for four days before being rescued.	880	Navy	
1941	Italy	Scillin – On 14 November the Italian steamship was sunk by submarine HMS Sahib, while carrying 814 British POWs. Only 26 or 27 POWs, together with 35 Italians, could be rescued. 787 (or 788) POWs and 79 Italians were lost (other sources put the number of POWs on board and lost as respectively 830 and 806).	866–885	Military	
1941	United Kingdom	HMS Barham – On 25 November, in the eastern Mediterranean north of Sidi Barrani, Barham capsized, exploded and sank two and a half minutes after being hit by three torpedoes fired by the German submarine U-331. 861 were killed. There were 450 survivors. The sinking was filmed.	861	Navy	
1942	Japan	Lisbon Maru – On 1 October the Japanese troop transport/freighter, while carrying 2,000 British POWs from the fall of Hong Kong, was torpedoed by the US submarine USS Grouper. An estimated 846 prisoners were killed. Many of the POWs were shot by their Japanese guards while they tried to swim to other ships in the convoy or to shore.	846	Military	
1944	Japan	Zuikaku – Aircraft carrier, sunk on 24 October in the Battle off Cape Engaño, killing 842 of the 1,704 people aboard.	842	Navy	
1939	United Kingdom	HMS Royal Oak – In one of the German Navy's earliest successes in World War II, U-47 torpedoed and sank the battleship on 14 October in the Royal Navy anchorage at Scapa Flow in the Orkney Islands, killing 833 people.	833	Navy	
1940	Germany	Blücher – Sunk by Norwegian shore defences at the Battle of Drøbak Sound on 9 April, killing 830 of 2,202 troops and crew aboard.	830	Navy	
1944	Belgium	Leopoldville – a Belgian troopship torpedoed and sunk by the German submarine U-486 on 24 December in the English Channel. 2,235 US servicemen were aboard, of whom about 515 are presumed to have gone down with the ship. Another 248 died from injuries, drowning or hypothermia along with 56 crew. The dead included several female nurses.	819	Military	
1941	Italy	Fiume – On 29 March, in the Battle of Cape Matapan, the Italian cruiser was sunk by the Royal Navy. Of the 1,083 aboard 814 were killed.	814	Navy	
1942	Japan	Kaga – Aircraft carrier, sunk on 4 June in the Battle of Midway, killing 811 of 1,708 people aboard.	811	Navy	
1942	United Kingdom	RMS Nova Scotia was sunk on 28 November east of Natal Province, South Africa by U-177. Nova Scotia was carrying 1,052 people; 192 survived.	808	Civilian	
1944	Japan	Nachi – On 5 November, while in Manila Bay, the Japanese cruiser was attacked by three waves of US planes from the aircraft carriers USS Lexington and Ticonderoga. Nachi was hit at least nine times with torpedoes and rockets. She broke into three parts after two large explosions and sank in the middle of a large oil slick. Of the crew, 807 were killed and 220 survived.	807	Navy	
1942	Italy	Aventino – On the night of 2 December the Italian troopship was sunk by British ships of the Force Q when her convoy was destroyed in the Battle of Skerki Bank. Aventino was shelled with heavy losses aboard and then sunk by a torpedo, sinking in five minutes with most of the troops aboard. Of 1,100 troops and crew, 170–300 were rescued.	800–900+	Military	
1941	Soviet Union	Vieniba – A hospital ship that was sunk on 27 June by German aircraft. The ship was evacuating wounded military personnel and refugees from the Latvian port city of Liepaja. More than 800 people were killed; eight survivors reached the coast and another five were picked up by an escort torpedo-boat.	800	Military	
1940	United Kingdom	Arandora Star – On 2 July the passenger liner, which was being used to transport German and Italian POWs and internees, was sunk by U-47 commanded by Günther Prien. Of 1,673 people aboard, 805 were killed.	805	Military	
1943	United Kingdom	Erinpura – On 1 May the troopship was attacked by Luftwaffe bombers and a bomb hit one of her holds. She sank within four minutes. Two junior engineers, 54 Indian seamen, three Gunners, 140 Palestinian Jewish soldiers serving in 462 Transport Company of the British Army, and 600 Basuto Pioneer Troops were killed. (Note – Photo is from World War I when Erinpura was a hospital ship.)	799	Military	
1941	Italy	Zara – On 29 March, in the Battle of Cape Matapan, the Italian cruiser was torpedoed, shelled and sunk by British naval forces. Of 1,086 crew, 799 were killed.	799	Navy	
1942	Romania	Struma – On 23 February, the small ship, crowded with Jewish refugees from Nazi-occupied Europe trying to reach Palestine, was towed from Istanbul through the Bosphorus and into the Black Sea by the Turkish authorities with her refugee passengers aboard, where she was left adrift with her engine inoperable. Early on 24 February she was torpedoed and sunk by the Soviet submarine Shch-213. There was only one survivor; an estimated 791 men, women and children were killed.	791	Civilian	
1941	United Kingdom	HMS Neptune – light cruiser mined and sunk off Tripoli on the night of 19–20 December, with the loss of all but one of her crew of 767; another 73 were killed when HMS Kandahar came to assist but struck a mine.	766	Navy	
1944	Japan	Taiyō – On 18 August, off Cape Bolinao, Luzon, the Japanese aircraft carrier was sunk while escorting a convoy bound for Manila. The US submarine USS Rasher hit Taiyō with a torpedo that caused the carrier's avgas and oil tanks to explode. She sank in 26 minutes with few survivors and 747 killed.	747	Navy	
1939	Soviet Union	Indigirka – the ship was transporting scientists released from Soviet Gulag prison camps to help the war effort when she sank in a blizzard off the Japanese coast on 13 December, killing 741 people.	741	Civilian	
1945	United States	USS Franklin – was badly damaged by a Japanese air attack and fire on 19 March that left 807 killed with 265 wounded. She was the most heavily damaged US carrier to survive the war.	724	Navy	
1940	United Kingdom	HMS Wakeful – On 29 May, while taking part in the evacuation of Dunkirk, the British destroyer was torpedoed and sunk by E-Boat S-30. Of the 750 crew and troops aboard, 724 were killed.	724	Navy	
1941	United Kingdom	HMS Gloucester – On 22 May, Gloucester was attacked by German Stuka dive bombers and sunk in the Battle of Crete with the loss of 722 men out of a crew of 807.	722	Navy	
1942	Japan	Sōryū – Aircraft carrier, sunk on 4 June in the Battle of Midway, killing 711 of her complement of 1,103.	711	Navy	
1942	United States	USS Houston- capsized and sunk during the Battle of Sunda Strait after being struck by four torpedoes. Of the 1061 aboard 368 survived but were captured and ended up in internment camps.	707	Navy	
1944	Japan	Oite – On 18 February, in Operation Hailstone, the Japanese destroyer was sunk in Truk harbor by Allied aircraft. Oite was torpedoed, broke in half, and sank almost immediately, killing 172 of 192 crew and all 523 survivors that she had rescued from the Agano that was sunk two days earlier.	695	Navy	
1942	United States	USS Juneau – Sunk at the Naval Battle of Guadalcanal in November. Juneau's 100+ survivors (out of a total complement of 697) were left on the ocean for eight days, before rescue aircraft belatedly arrived and found 10 survivors.	687	Navy	
1943	United States	SS Dorchester – was sunk by a torpedo from a German U-boat on 3 February while sailing to Greenland as part of a naval convoy. The loss of the ship became especially famous because of the story of the death of four Army chaplains, known as the "Four Chaplains" or the "Immortal Chaplains," who all gave away their life jackets to save others before they died. Of the 902 men aboard 672 were killed; 230 survived.	672	Military	
1942	United Kingdom	Ceramic – On 6 December the British ocean liner Ceramic was sunk by U-515 west of the Azores in the Atlantic. U-515 hit her with three torpedoes and Ceramic was crippled but remained afloat. About eight full lifeboats were launched and about three hours later U-515 fired two more torpedoes that broke her back, sinking her immediately. The sea became rough and the lifeboats began capsizing in the storm. On returning to search for the ship's captain U-515 took one prisoner and left the others. Of the 656 aboard he was the only survivor. It was the deadliest British passenger ship disaster of the war (liners like Laconia and Lancastria, with thousands more dead were officially "His Majesty's Ship").	655	Civilian	
1942	Japan	Mikuma – Heavy cruiser, sunk on 5 June in the Battle of Midway, with the loss of 650 of her crew.	650	Navy	
1941	(United Kingdom) Australia	HMAS Sydney – The light cruiser was sunk by the German auxiliary cruiser Kormoran on 19 November off the coast of Western Australia with the loss of all 645 sailors aboard, making her the largest Allied vessel to be lost with all hands in World War II.	645	Navy	
1943	United States	USS Liscome Bay – was an escort carrier that was lost to a submarine attack in Operation Galvanic on 24 November. Of the 916 crew aboard, 644 were killed and 272 rescued.	644	Navy	
1944	United States	USS LST-531 – In a D-Day training exercise named Exercise Tiger on 28 April LST-531 was torpedoed and sunk by German E-boats. Of 926 troops and crew aboard, 636 were killed and 290 survived.	636	Navy	
1945	Japan	Kashii – On 12 January, shortly after leaving Qui Nhon Bay, Indochina with convoy HI-86, US Navy bombers attacked and sank most of the convoy's ships. Kashii was hit starboard amidships by a torpedo from a TBF Avenger then a SB2C Helldiver struck with two bombs aft setting off the depth charge magazine. The cruiser sank stern first, with 621 killed and 19 rescued.	621	Navy	Kashii sinking on 12 January 1945
1944	Japan	Tamahoko Maru – this Japanese passenger-cargo ship was torpedoed by submarine USS Tang on 24 June, carrying Japanese troops and 772 Allied POWs of which 560 died.	595+	Military	
1944	United States	Paul Hamilton – was a Liberty ship serving as a troopship. On the evening of 20 April German bombers attacked her off Cape Bengut near Algiers. One aerial torpedo struck her and detonated her cargo of high explosives and bombs; the ship and all aboard disappeared within 30 seconds. The crew and passengers, who included 154 officers and men of the 831st Bombardment Squadron, were all lost. Of the 580 men aboard only one body was recovered.	580	Military	
1941	Germany	Pinguin – A German auxiliary cruiser which served as a commerce raider in World War II that captured or sunk 32 ships. On 8 May she was sunk in a battle with HMS Cornwall in the Indian Ocean. Of 401 crew, 341 were lost along with 214 of the 238 prisoners aboard.	555		
1942	Italy	Trento – On 15 June, during Operation Vigorous, the Italian heavy cruiser was disabled by a torpedo bomber and, during attempts to take her in tow, was torpedoed by HMS Umbra and quickly sank. 570 men went down with the ship or died of their wounds, out of a crew of 1,151.	570	Navy	
1943	Italy	Caterina Costa – On 28 March the Italian cargo ship, ready to sail for Tunisia with a large cargo of fuel and ammunitions, accidentally caught fire and blew up in the harbour of Naples, sinking two assisting tugboats and causing heavy damage to the harbour facilities and the buildings nearby. At least 549 people were killed and about 3,000 wounded.	549+	Military	
1945	Japan	Ukishima Maru (navy) – Exploded and sank on 22 August, on entering the port of Maizuru, killing 549 people, mainly Koreans.	549	Military	
1941	Italy	Italian cruiser Alberico da Barbiano – On 13 December the Italian light cruiser, during a fuel transport mission to Libya, was sunk by destroyers Legion, Sikh, Maori and Isaac Sweers together with her sistership Alberto Di Giussano. The ship capsized after bursting into flames and only 250 of the 784 men a board (which included Admiral Antonino Toscano, commander of the 4th Cruiser Division, and several personnel on passage) were saved. Toscano was among the killed.	534	Navy	
1943	Germany	Z27, T25 and T26 – In the Bay of Biscay, on 28 December, Z27, a Kriegsmarine Narvik-class destroyer and two Elbing-class torpedo boats, T25 and T26 were waiting to escort Alsterufer, a blockade runner that had come from Japan. The Royal Navy knew the German positions and had already sunk Alsterufer. The cruisers HMS Glasgow and Enterprise shelled and sank Z27, T25, and T26 from over the horizon. In one of the most remarkable rescues of the war, the 142 ft (43 m) neutral Irish coaster Kerlogue rescued 168 survivors from the three ships' 700 crew.	532	Navy	
1943	Italy	Lanzerotto Malocello – On 24 March the Italian destroyer, carrying German troops to Tunis, sank after hitting a mine. 199 of Malocello's 237–241 crew were killed, together with 321 of the 359 German soldiers aboard.	520	Navy	
1939	United Kingdom	HMS Courageous – The aircraft carrier was torpedoed on 17 September. She capsized and sank in 15 minutes, killing 518 of her crew.	518	Navy	
1942	United Kingdom	HMS Avenger – On 15 November, after participating in Operation Torch, the British escort carrier was sunk by the U-155 while nearing Gibraltar. At the time she was returning home with engine problems and 516 of her crew were killed.	516	Navy	
1941	United Kingdom	HMS Repulse – On 10 December, three days after Pearl Harbor, the battlecruiser was sent with the battleship Prince of Wales to intercept Japanese landings in Malaya, but were sunk by Japanese aircraft based in Saigon. 840 sailors were killed: 513 on Repulse and 327 on Prince of Wales. Winston Churchill said when he heard about the sinkings: "In all the war, I never received a more direct shock...".	513	Navy	
1942	Netherlands	HNLMS Java – On 27 February, HNLMS Java along with HNLMS De Ruyter and other Allied cruisers and destroyers led a sortie against Japanese warships in an attempt to stop the Japanese invasion fleet in the Battle of the Java Sea. 512 of the crew were killed.	512	Navy	
1942	Japan	Kinugasa – On 13 November, in the Naval Battle of Guadalcanal, the Japanese cruiser was sunk after being bombed by US aircraft. A 500 lb (227 kg) bomb hit Kinugasa in front of the bridge starting a fire in the forward gasoline storage area and Kinugasa gradually began to list to port. Near-misses caused more fires and flooding and a second attack by 17 more Dauntless dive bombers knocked out her engines and rudder along with opening more compartments to the sea. Kinugasa capsized and sank southwest of Rendova Island, killing 511 of her crew.	511	Navy	
1942	Netherlands	Rooseboom – On 1 March, while transporting refugees, mainly women and children, from the Fall of Malaya and Singapore, the Dutch troopship was torpedoed and sunk by the Japanese submarine I-159 west of Sumatra while steaming from Padang in the Dutch East Indies to Colombo in Ceylon. She capsized and sank rapidly leaving only one life boat, designed to hold 28 but with 80 aboard, and 135 people in the water. Two of the survivors from the water were picked up nine days later by the Dutch cargo ship Palopo and only 6 survivors from the lifeboat when it was ultimately captured by the Japanese.	500	Civilian	
1942	Italy	Tembien – On 27 February the Italian steamship, carrying 498 British POWs in addition to 137 Italian and 20 German troops and crew, was torpedoed and sunk by HMS Upholder off Tripoli. 419 POWs, 68 Italians and 10 Germans were lost.	497	Military	
1943	United Kingdom	Yoma – On 17 June the British troopship, while part of a convoy northwest of the port of Derna, Libya, was torpedoed and sunk by the German submarine U-81. She sank rapidly and 484 people were killed while another 1,477 were rescued.	484	Military	
1941	Italy	Armando Diaz – On 25 February the Italian cruiser was torpedoed and sunk by the British submarine HMS Upright off the island of Kerkennah in the early hours of 25 February. Of the 633 aboard 484 were killed.	484	Navy	
1942	Japan	Jintsū – On 13 July, the Sendai-class cruiser was torpedoed, shelled and sunk in the Pacific Ocean off the Solomon Islands (7°38′S 157°06′E) by Allied cruisers and destroyers. 482 crewmen were killed.	482	Navy	
1943	Italy	Ascari – On 24 March the Italian destroyer, in a troop transport mission to Tunis, struck three mines and sank while rescuing survivors of another sunken destroyer, Lanzerotto Malocello. 194 of Ascari's 247 crew were killed, together with 280 of the 286 German soldiers aboard.	474	Navy	
1941	United Kingdom	HMS Galatea – On 14 December before midnight the light cruiser was torpedoed and sunk by U-557 off Alexandria, Egypt killing 469 of her crew. Some 100 survivors were picked up by the destroyers HMS Griffin and Hotspur. Less than 48 hours later, U-557 was rammed by the Italian Torpedo Boat Orione and sunk with all hands.	469	Navy	
1943	United Kingdom	HMS Charybdis – the British cruiser was sunk by German torpedo boats in an action in the English Channel on 23 October. Of the 571 aboard 464 were killed.	464	Navy	
1944	Japan	Tama – On 20 October, in the Battle of Leyte Gulf, the Japanese cruiser was hit by three torpedoes fired from the USS Jallao. Tama broke in two and sank within minutes with all hands.	450	Navy	
1945	Japan	Yahagi – On 7 April, the cruiser was badly damaged, capsized and sank after being attacked by aircraft from US Task Force 58. Of her crew of 736 aboard, 445 were killed.	445	Navy	
1944	Japan	Asama Maru – On 1 November the Japanese troopship was torpedoed and sunk by USS Atule in the South China Sea 100 miles (160 km) south of the island of Pratas. Of the 1,874 crew, gunners and military personnel aboard 440 were killed.	440	Military	
1942	Italy	Nino Bixio – On 17 August the Italian cargo ship, sailing in convoy from Benghazi to Brindisi with 3,200 POWs aboard, was torpedoed and damaged by HMS Turbulent. The ship could be towed to Navarino, Greece, but 336 POWs and 118 Italian troops and crew were killed.	434	Military	
1941	Italy	Città di Messina – On 15 January the Italian troop transport was torpedoed and sunk by HMS Regent while carrying Italian Air Force Personnel. 432 men perished while 166 were rescued.	432	Military	
1941	United States	USS Oklahoma – On 7 December, she was sunk by several bombs and torpedoes during the Japanese attack on Pearl Harbor. A total of 429 crew died when she capsized in Battleship Row.	429	Navy	
1941	United Kingdom	HMS Dunedin – On 24 November, she was in the Central Atlantic northeast of Recife, Brazil when she was sunk by two torpedoes from the German submarine U-124. Four officers and 63 men survived from a crew of 486.	419	Navy	
1944	United Kingdom	HMS Penelope – On 18 February the cruiser was leaving Naples to return to the Anzio area when she was torpedoed by U-410. A torpedo struck her after engine room and was followed 16 minutes later by another torpedo that hit her after boiler room causing her immediate sinking. Her captain and 414 of her crew were killed; 206 survived.	415	Navy	
1942	Italy	Victoria – On 23 January the Italian liner was sunk by multiple torpedo bomber strikes while carrying troops to Tripoli. 1,046 survivors were picked up by the escorts but 409 died.	409	Military	
1943	United Kingdom	RMS Empress of Canada – On 13 March the British troopship, en route from Durban, South Africa to Takoradi carrying Italian prisoners of war along with Polish and Greek refugees, was torpedoed and sunk by the Leonardo da Vinci about 400 nautical miles (740 km) south of Cape Palmas off the coast of Africa. Of about 1,800 people aboard 392 were killed. Nearly half of the deaths reported were Italian prisoners.	392	Military	
1945	United States	USS Bunker Hill - On the morning of 11 May, while supporting the invasion of Okinawa, Bunker Hill was struck and severely damaged by two Japanese kamikaze planes. She lost a total of 390 sailors and airmen killed, including 43 missing (never found), and 264 wounded. Bunker Hill was heavily damaged but was able to steam at 20 knots to Ulithi. She was still in the shipyard when the war ended in mid-August 1945.	390	Navy	USS Bunker Hill (CV-17) at sea in 1945 (NH 42373)
1942	Italy	Italian cruiser Giovanni delle Bande Nere – On 1 April, en route to La Spezia to repair storm damage, the Italian cruiser was hit by two torpedoes from the submarine HMS Urge. She broke in two and sank with the loss of 381 men; 391 men were saved.	381	Navy	
1940	France	Brazza – French cargo liner torpedoed by U-37. 379 passengers and crew were killed; 197 were rescued.	379	Civilian	
1943	United Kingdom	HMS Dasher – British escort aircraft carrier that sank after an internal explosion, killing 379 of her crew of 528.	379	Navy	
1945	United States	Charles Henderson – On 9 April, while unloading a shipment of munitions at the Bari, Italy port, the Liberty ship suffered an explosion that killed all on board along with 267 Italian nationals.	376	Military	
1942	United States	USS Quincy – On 9 August, at the Battle of Savo Island, the US heavy cruiser was sunk by torpedoes and naval gunfire. She sustained many direct hits which killed 370 men and wounded 167. She sank bow, first and was the first ship sunk in the area later known as Ironbottom Sound.	370	Navy	
1942	United Kingdom	HMS Fidelity – On 30 December the British Special Service Vessel (Q-ship) was torpedoed and sunk by U-435 with the loss of 274 crew, 51 Marines and 44 survivors from Empire Shackleton. The only survivors were the eight crew of the motor torpedo boat, that were detached on anti-submarine patrol, who were later picked up by HMCS Woodstock and two crew of a seaplane that had crashed on takeoff two days earlier and had been picked up by HMCS St. Laurent.	369	Navy	
1943	Germany	Doggerbank – On a return trip from Japan to France the auxiliary minelayer was accidentally sunk by U-43 on 3 March. All but one of the 365 men aboard, 108 crew plus 257 prisoners-of-war, were killed in the sinking and delayed rescue.	364	Navy	
1942	United Kingdom	Abosso – On 29 October the British ship was in the Atlantic about 589 nautical miles (1,091 km) north of the Azores when she was torpedoed and sunk by the German submarine U-575. 10 lifeboats and rafts were launched but only one was recovered. 362 of the 393 people aboard were killed, including 9 of the 10 female passengers.	362	Civilian	
1943	Japan	Nichiryu Maru – On 7 January, the Japanese troop transport/freighter, carrying 1,100 troops, was bombed and sunk off Lae, New Guinea (06°30′S 149°00′E) by aircraft of the United States Army Air Force, Royal Australian Air Force and Royal New Zealand Air Force. 739 survivors were rescued by Maikaze	361	Military	
1940	United Kingdom	Calabria – On 8 December the passenger and cargo steamship, while traveling in a convoy, was torpedoed and sunk with the loss of all 360 crew and passengers aboard.	360	Civilian	
1941	United Kingdom	Almeda Star – On 17 January the passenger and cargo liner was about 35 nautical miles (65 km) north of Rockall in heavy seas when U-96 hit her amidships with one torpedo, causing her to stop. She did not sink so U-96 fired two more torpedoes hitting the liner in the stern and again amidships. She had launched four lifeboats but still had people on deck when U-96 surfaced and opened fire on her with her 88 mm deck gun. The submarine fired 28 incendiary shells about 15 of which hit the liner and started small fires aboard. These soon went out and U-96 hit her with a fourth torpedo which exploded in her forepart. Within three minutes Almeda Star sank by her bow. When rescue ships arrived no trace of the ship or the 360 aboard was found.	360	Civilian	
1944	Japan	Atago – On 23 October, in the Battle of Leyte Gulf, the Japanese cruiser was sunk after being hit by four torpedoes fired from the submarine USS Darter. Atago was set ablaze, capsized and sank in about 1,800 m (5,900 ft) of water. 360 people were killed; 529 survived.	360	Navy	
1942	(United Kingdom) Australia	HMAS Perth – A light cruiser that was sunk on 1 March at the Battle of Sunda Strait. Of the 681 sailors aboard, 353 were killed in battle. All but four of the 328 survivors were captured as prisoners of war. Of those captured, 106 died in captivity and the surviving 218 were returned home to Australia after the war.	353	Navy	
1944	United States	USS Mount Hood – On 10 November, while at anchor in Seeadler Harbor, the ammunition ship suffered an internal explosion that detonated her cargo of munitions and obliterated her. All 350 crew aboard were killed with no remains recovered. The concussion and metal fragments hurled from the ship also caused casualties and damage to ships and small craft within 2,000 yards (1,800 m). The repair ship USS Mindanao, which was broadside-on to the blast, was the most seriously damaged. All personnel topside on Mindanao were killed outright, and dozens of men were killed or wounded below decks as numerous heavy fragments from Mount Hood penetrated the side plating. In all 82 of Mindanao's crew died. Another 22 small boats and landing craft were sunk, destroyed, or damaged beyond repair with 371 sailors were injured from all ships in the harbor.	350	Navy	
1944	Japan	Nagara – On 7 August, while en route from Kagoshima to Sasebo, the Japanese cruiser was sighted by USS Croaker. The submarine closed to 1,300 yards and fired a salvo of four stern torpedoes hitting Nagara starboard aft with one. Nagara sank by the stern off the Amakusa islands with 349 lost and 235 crew rescued.	349	Navy	
1941	Italy	Andrea Gritti – An Italian cargo ship sunk by British torpedo bombers on 3 September while carrying troops and supplies for the Axis forces in North Africa. The ship, sailing in a convoy, blew up with the loss of 347 men; there were only two survivors.	347	Military	
1942	Netherlands	HNLMS De Ruyter – On 27 February, HNLMS De Ruyter along with HNLMS Java and other Allied cruisers and destroyers led a sortie against Japanese warships in an attempt to stop the Japanese invasion fleet in the Battle of the Java Sea. 345 of the crew were killed.	345	Navy	
1943	Italy	Emma – On 16 January the Italian cargo ship, carrying supplies (including ammunitions) to Tunisia, was torpedoed by HMS Splendid and blew up off Ischia. All but 7 of the 350 men aboard were killed.	343	Military	
1942	Germany	Z16 Friedrich Eckoldt – On 31 December, in the Battle of the Barents Sea, the German destroyer was sunk with all hands by the British cruiser HMS Sheffield. 341 people were killed.	341	Navy	
1944	Japan	Maya – On 22 October, in the Battle of Leyte Gulf the Japanese cruiser was sunk by the US submarine USS Dace hitting her with four torpedoes. She sank within five minutes, killing 336 of her crew. The next day another 143 of her crew, having had been rescued from the sinking, were killed when the Japanese battleship Musashi was sunk.	336	Navy	
1941	Italy	Pola – On 29 March, in the Battle of Matapan, the Italian cruiser was disabled by an aerial torpedo and then sunk by British naval forces. Of the 1,024 crew aboard 336 were killed.	336	Navy	
1941	Italy	Diana – On 29 June the Italian sloop, carrying Italian Navy personnel to Tobruk, was torpedoed and sunk by HMS Thrasher. 336 men died in the sinking, and 119 were rescued.	336	Military	
1942	United States	USS Vincennes – On 9 August, in the Battle of Savo Island, the US heavy cruiser was sunk by Japanese torpedoes and naval gunfire. 332 of her crew were killed.	332	Navy	
1944	Japan	Natori – On 18 August, 200 nautical miles (370 km) east of Samar, the Japanese cruiser was torpedoed and sunk by the US submarine USS Hardhead. The destroyers Uranami and Kiyoshimo rescued 194 survivors and USS Stingray recovered four others in a rubber raft. However, 330 crew of Natori were killed. On 12 September 1944, almost a month after her sinking, USS Marshall captured a lifeboat with another 44 of Natori's survivors aboard.	330	Navy	
1941	United Kingdom	HMS Prince of Wales – On 10 December, three days after Pearl Harbor, the British battleship was sent to intercept Japanese landings in Malaya but was sunk by Japanese aircraft based in Saigon along with the battlecruiser Repulse. Of the 1,521 aboard Prince of Wales 327 were killed, along with 513 on Repulse. Winston Churchill said when he heard about the sinkings: "In all the war, I never received a more direct shock...".	327	Navy	
1945	Japan	Asashimo – On 7 April, while escorting the Japanese battleship Yamato, the destroyer was sunk by Allied aircraft with all 326 hands 150 nautical miles (280 km) southwest of Nagasaki after falling astern of Yamato's task force with engine trouble.	326	Navy	
1941	Italy	Sebastiano Venier – On 9 December the Italian cargo vessel, carrying 3,000 Commonwealth POWs from Libya, was torpedoed by HMS Porpoise and was run aground near Cape Methoni. 309 POWs and 11 Italian soldiers and crew lost their lives, while 1,691 POWs, 156 Italians and 15 Germans survived.	320	Military	
1944	United States	Port Chicago disaster – On 17 July a munitions explosion on the pier triggered a massive secondary explosion on the ammunition-laden Liberty ship SS E A Bryan, destroying her, which spread to the dock and sank the neighboring Victory ship SS Quinault Victory and United States Coast Guard fireboat CG-60014-F. The largest US home front loss of life during World War II, the disaster claimed 320 military personnel and civilians with another 390 injured. This also directly led to the Port Chicago Muntiny.	320	Navy, Coast Guard, and civilian	
1945	United States	USS Bismarck Sea – On 21 February, in the Battle of Iwo Jima, the aircraft carrier was sunk by a kamikaze aircraft attack. The first aircraft crashed through the hangar deck, striking the ship's magazines and starting fires. They were almost under control when a second aircraft hit her, destroying the water system for the fire control system. The order was given to abandon ship and she sank with 318 men killed and 605 rescued. She was the last US Navy aircraft carrier lost in World War II.	318	Navy	
1944	United States	USS Spence – On 18 December, in Typhoon Cobra, the US destroyer capsized and sank after her rudder jammed. Of the crew aboard 317 men were killed with 23 survivors.	317	Navy	
1944	Japan	Katori – On 19 February, in Operation Hailstone, the Japanese cruiser sank after being shelled by the battleship USS Iowa. After being under attack for 13 minutes, Katori sank stern first with a port side list at about 40 nautical miles (74 km) northwest of Truk. A large group of survivors was seen in the water after she sank but the Americans did not recover any.	315	Navy	
1940	Germany	Z3 Max Schultz – On 22 February, while en route to Dogger Bank to intercept British fishing vessels, the German destroyer hit a mine and sank with all hands. At the time she was rescuing crew from Z1 Leberecht Maass that had been mistakenly bombed by German aircraft. In total 308 were killed on Max Schultz.	308	Navy	
1942	United Kingdom	HMS Hermes – On 9 April the British aircraft carrier and her escorting Australian destroyer HMAS Vampire were sunk south-east of Trincomalee, Ceylon by Japanese aircraft. Hermes sank with the loss of 307 men. Most of the survivors were rescued by the hospital ship Vita.	307	Navy	
1944	Japan	Urakaze – On 21 November the Japanese destroyer was torpedoed and sunk with all hands by the USS Sealion 65 nautical miles (120 km) north-northwest of Keelung, Formosa. Several survivors were previously rescued from Tanikaze were also killed.	307	Navy	
1944	Turkey	Mefküre – Motor schooner chartered to carry Jewish refugees from Romania to Palestine, sailing under the Turkish and Red Cross flags. On 5 August, while she was crossing the Black Sea, the Soviet submarine Shch-215 torpedoed and sank her, killing an estimated 305 people. 11 people (five passengers and six crew) survived.	305	Civilian	
1943	Italy	Andrea Sgarallino – On 22 September the submarine HMS Uproar torpedoed and sank the Italian coastal steamship en route from Piombino to Portoferraio on Elba. The ship sank immediately leaving only four or five survivors out of the estimated 300–330 people aboard.	300–330	Civilian	
1943	Italy	Diocleziano – An Italian steamship heavily damaged by Luftwaffe bombers while evacuating Italian troops from Yugoslavia and run aground near Biševo on 24 September. 300 to 700 of the soldiers aboard were killed.	300–700	Military	
1945	Japan	Ōyodo – On 24 July the Japanese cruiser was bombed, capsized and sank in shallow water at Kure, Hiroshima. She was hit by eight bombs and strafed before capsizing with 300 of her crew killed.	300	Navy	
1943	Germany	Michel – On 17 October the German commerce raider was torpedoed and sunk by USS Tarpon while heading to port in Japan. She was hit by three torpedoes and sank with 290 of her crew. 116 survivors reached Japan after a three-day journey in open boats.	290	Navy	
1943	Italy	D’Annunzio – On 16 January the Italian cargo vessel, fleeing from Tripoli (about to fall in British hands) carrying the inmates of Tripoli jails (both common criminals and political prisoners), was shelled, torpedoed and sunk by destroyers HMS Nubian and HMS Kelvin. Only 10 of the about 300 men on board survived.	c. 290	Military	
1943	Japan	Niizuki – On 6 July the Akizuki-class destroyer was shelled and sunk in the Pacific Ocean approximately five miles east of Tuki Point, Kolombangara (7°57′S 157°12′E) by United States Navy ships. Approximately 290 officers and men were lost.	c. 290	Navy	
1941	Italy	Italian cruiser Alberto di Giussano – On 13 December the Italian light cruiser, during a fuel transport mission to Libya, was sunk by destroyers Legion, Sikh, Maori and Isaac Sweers together with her sister ship Alberico Da Barbiano. The ship broke in two after allowing most of her crew to abandon the ship, but 283 of the 720 men aboard (including personnel on passage) were lost.	283	Navy	
1940	Germany	Z1 Leberecht Maass – On 22 February, while sailing to the Dogger Bank to intercept British fishing vessels in "Operation Wikinger" in a flotilla, the German destroyer was erroneously attacked by a Heinkel He 111 bomber. She was hit by at least one bomb, lost steering, broke in half and sank. 280 of her crew were killed; 60 survived. In the rescue Z3 Max Schultz hit a mine and sank with all hands.	280	Navy	
1942	Italy	Gino Allegri – On 31 May the Italian cargo vessel, en route from Brindisi to Benghazi with munitions and other supplies, blew up after being hit by combined attacks of aircraft and HMS Proteus. 21 wounded survivors were picked up by the destroyer Euro, out of some 300 men aboard.	280+	Military	
1942	United Kingdom	HMS Hecla – This Destroyer-Depot Ship was torpedoed just after midnight on 12 November by German submarine U-515, during the Allied landings in North Africa, and sunk west of Gibraltar. HMS Venomous saved 568 people, but 279 off the crew went down with the ship	279	Navy	
1944	Germany	Z36 – On 12 December, while laying a minefield off Estonia in the Gulf of Finland, the German destroyer Z36 struck a German mine and sank along with the destroyer Z35. Of those aboard 278 were killed.	278	Navy	
1941	Finland	Finnish coastal defence ship Ilmarinen – On 13 September, mines became entangled in Ilmarinen's paravane cable. When the vessel turned, the mines hit the ship and detonated, sinking her in seven minutes. 132 of the crew survived; 271 were killed.	271	Navy	
1942	Brazil	Baependy – On 16 August, the Brazilian merchant ship was torpedoed by the U 507. Two torpedoes were launched, with an interval of 30 seconds, breaking the ship in half.	270	Civilian	
1943	Australia	AHS Centaur – A hospital ship attacked and sunk by a Japanese submarine on 16 May off Queensland, Australia. Of the 332 medical personnel and crew aboard, 268 died. It was not until 1979 that the attacking submarine, I-177, was identified.	268	Civilian	
1944	Germany	Z35 – On 12 December, while laying a minefield off Estonia in the Gulf of Finland, the German destroyer struck a German mine and sank along with the destroyer Z36. Of the crew aboard 262 were killed.	262	Navy	
1940	France	Patria – An ocean liner carrying about 1,770 Jewish refugees from Europe and 134 other passengers, sunk by a bomb just outside the port of Haifa on 25 November, while en route to Mauritius. The refugees aboard had been transferred to the ship at Haifa after being denied entry to Palestine. The bomb, planted by members of the Jewish Haganah in the hope of disabling the ship, sank her instead. 260 were killed (209 bodies recovered), 172 injured. The surviving refugees were allowed to remain in Palestine.	260	Civilian	
1940	United Kingdom	City of Benares – The passenger ship was sunk by U-48 on 17 September. Out of 406 people, 258 were lost, including 77 children of the Children's Overseas Reception Board (CORB) program and four other children traveling privately. The ship's loss caused the CORB program to be cancelled on 2 October.	258	Civilian	
1944	United States	USS Monaghan – On 18 December, in Typhoon Cobra, the US destroyer capsized and sank. Of the crew aboard 256 were killed with six survivors.	256	Navy	
1943	Italy	Città di Catania – On 3 August the Italian passenger steamship, while sailing from Durrës to Brindisi with 407 passengers (soldiers and civilians) and 105 crew, was torpedoed by HMS Unruffled, broke in two and sank within two minutes. 207 passengers and 49 crew were lost.	256	Civilian	
1945	United States	USS Serpens – On 29 January the Navy cargo ship was destroyed in an explosion while taking on a cargo of depth charges while docked at Lunga Point with only the bow section surviving. Only two on board survived while two hundred fifty-five were killed including one soldier on shore.	255	Navy	
1941	United Kingdom	Anselm – On 5 July the German submarine U-96 torpedoed and sank the troopship 300 nautical miles (560 km) north of the Azores. 250 troops and four crew were killed; 93 crew, three DEMS gunners and 965 troops survived.	254	Navy	
1943	United Kingdom	HMS Eclipse – On 24 October the destroyer struck a mine in the Aegean Sea off Kalymnos. She broke in two and sank within five minutes with the loss of 119 of her company and 134 soldiers from A Company, 4th Battalion, The Buffs.	253	Navy	
1944	United States	USS Hoel – On 25 October, in the Battle off Samar, the US destroyer was sunk by naval gunfire. After being hit more than 40 times she rolled over and sank. 86 of her complement survived; 253 officers and men were killed.	253	Navy	
1942	Canada	RMS Lady Hawkins – On 19 January the liner was torpedoed and sunk by U-66 150 nmi (280 km) off Cape Hatteras, North Carolina. The final death toll was 251, including five who died in a lifeboat that was at sea for five days after the sinking. 71 survivors were rescued.	251	Civilian	
1942	Germany	Komet – On 14 October the German commerce raider was attacked by British motor torpedo boats near the Cap de la Hague. She was hit by a torpedo from MTB 236 and sank with no survivors.	251	Navy	
1944	Japan	Abukuma – On 26 October, in the Battle of Surigao Strait, the Japanese cruiser was sunk by Allied aircraft. B-24 Liberator bombers sighted Abukuma and repeatedly bombed her, starting fires and causing her to lose power. Four torpedoes in the aft torpedo room exploded with devastating effect. She sank by the stern killing 250 of her crew; her captain and 283 were rescued.	250	Navy	
1944	Japan	Hiyō – On 20 June, in the Battle of the Philippine Sea the Japanese aircraft carrier was sunk by a gasoline vapor explosion caused by a US torpedo hit. About 1,000 men were rescued by her escorting destroyers; 247 officers and enlisted men were killed.	247	Navy	
1943	Japan	Kaisho Maru – On 4 August the Horaisan Maru-class auxiliary transport ship was torpedoed and sunk in the Java Sea south of Borneo off Cape Atein (05°18′S 111°50′E) by USS Finback (United States Navy). 196 passengers, including 57 Japanese and 139 Javanese, and 47 crewmen were killed.	243	Navy	
1941	United Kingdom	HMS Fiji – On 22 May the British light cruiser was sunk by a German bomber attack south west of Crete. She was hit by several bombs that disabled her then by three bombs dropped by a Junkers Ju 88 she rolled over and sank. There were 523 survivors but 241 men had gone down with the ship.	241	Navy	
1944	Japan	Naka – On 18 February the Japanese cruiser was sunk by Allied aircraft near Truk Lagoon. Naka was hit by a torpedo along with a bomb in the third strike and broke in two. Some 240 crew were killed but patrol boats rescued 210 men.	240	Navy	
1944	Japan	Maikaze – On 17 February, while evacuating convoys to Yokosuka from Truk following Operation Hailstone, the Japanese destroyer was sunk by gunfire from US cruisers 40 nautical miles (74 km) northwest of Truk. There were no survivors.	240	Navy	
1944	United States	USS Birmingham – On 24 October, during the Battle of Leyte Gulf while alongside the battle damaged and burning USS Princeton, Birmingham was caught in a munitions explosion on board the Princeton while assisting in extinguishing fires on the crippled carrier. Two hundred thirty-nine of Birmingham's crew were killed and 408 were injured.	239	Navy	
1944	Japan	Unyō – On 17 September the Japanese aircraft carrier was struck by two torpedoes fired by USS Barb and sunk 220 nautical miles (410 km) southeast of Hong Kong. Of about 1,000 people aboard, crew and passengers, 761 were rescued.	239	Navy	
1942	United Kingdom	HMS Curacoa – On 2 October about 32 nautical miles (60 km) north of the coast of Ireland she was escorting the liner RMS Queen Mary carrying 10,000 US troops of the 29th Infantry Division to join the Allied forces in Europe. At 2:15 PM Queen Mary started the starboard turn for the first leg of her zig-zag pattern, cutting across the path of Curacoa with insufficient clearance, and struck her amidships cutting her in two. Curacoa sank in six minutes with the loss of 239 of the 338 aboard.	239	Navy	
1939	United Kingdom	HMS Rawalpindi – on patrol, the armed merchant cruiser encountered the German battlecruisers Scharnhorst and Gneisenau and was sunk on 23 November. Out of her 276 crew, 238 were killed.	238	Navy	
1942	Italy	Scirocco – On 23 March the Italian destroyer foundered in a storm after the Second Battle of Sirte. Two men survived out of a crew of 236.	234	Navy	
1942	United States	USS Jarvis – On 9 August, in the Guadalcanal campaign, the US destroyer was sunk in an air attack. The Japanese, mistaking Jarvis for an escaping cruiser, dispatched 31 planes from Rabaul to search out and destroy her. Once discovered the badly damaged destroyer was no match for bombers raking her with bullets and torpedoes. According to Japanese records she "split and sank" with none of her 233 crew surviving.	233	Navy	
1942	Italy	Tabarca – A small Italian transport which sank in a few seconds after hitting a mine off Leghorn on 1 December. All but eight of the 241 men aboard went down with the ship.	233	Military	
1941	Japan	Shinonome – On either 17 or 18 December the Japanese destroyer was bombed by Allied aircraft and sunk near Miri, Sarawak. She exploded and sank with all hands when her aft magazine detonated in the attack.	230	Navy	
1944	Japan	Tamanami – On 7 July, while escorting the tanker Kokuyo Maru from Singapore towards Manila, the Japanese destroyer was torpedoed and sunk. She was attacked by USS Mingo 280 km (170 mi) west-southwest of Manila and blew up sinking with all hands after being torpedoed.	228	Navy	
1943	Japan	Kiyonami – On 20 July, while rescuing the crew of Japanese destroyer Yūgure, the Japanese destroyer was sunk by U.S. Army B-25 bombers north-northwest of Kolombangara. There were no survivors from among the entire combined Kiyonami and Yūgure crews of 468 men.	228	Navy	
1942	Japan	Yamakaze – On 25 June, while steaming independently from Ōminato towards the Inland Sea, the Japanese destroyer was torpedoed and sunk with loss of all hands by the submarine USS Nautilus about 60 nautical miles (110 km) southeast of Yokosuka.	226	Navy	
1942	Italy	Lanciere – On 23 March the Italian destroyer foundered in a storm after the Second Battle of Sirte. Only 16 of her 242 crew were rescued, and one died shortly thereafter.	226	Navy	
1943	Japan	Asashio – On 3 March, in the Battle of the Bismarck Sea, the Japanese destroyer was sunk by an Allied air attack. After weathering the first waves, Asashio was bombed and strafed later in the day while attempting to rescue survivors from the destroyers Arashio and Nojima. Arashio was lost with all 226 hands, about 45 nautical miles (83 km) southeast of Finschhafen, New Guinea.	226	Navy	
1942	Italy	Aviere – On 17 December the Italian destroyer, while escorting the German cargo ship Ankara from Napoli to Bizerte together with the destroyer Camicia Nera, was torpedoed by the submarine HMS Splendid and sank in a few minutes, after breaking in two. 220 of her crew were killed; 30 were rescued.	220	Navy	
1944	Japan	Shirakumo – On 16 March, after departing Kushiro in northern Hokkaidō with a troop convoy for Uruppu Island, the Japanese destroyer was torpedoed by the US submarine USS Tautog 170 nautical miles (310 km) east of Muroran. She sank instantly and there were no survivors from the 219 aboard.	219	Navy	
1944	Japan	Usugumo – On 5 July, after departing Otaru, Hokkaidō with a convoy bound for Uruppu, the Japanese destroyer was torpedoed by USS Skate in the Sea of Okhotsk west-southwest of Paramushiro. She was hit by two torpedoes that broke her back and she sank in six minutes. There were no survivors.	219	Navy	
1942	United States	USS Astoria – was a heavy cruiser that was sunk in August at the Battle of Savo Island with 219 men being reported missing or killed.	219	Navy	
1943	Italy	Antonio Da Noli – An Italian destroyer which struck a mine and sank in the Strait of Bonifacio on 9 September. 218 of her 257 crew were lost.	218	Navy	
1942	Italy	Lago Tana – A small Italian auxiliary cruiser which was sunk by multiple air strikes between Pantelleria and Lampedusa on 20 November. Due to all lifeboats having been destroyed during the air strike, all but two of the 217 crew and troops aboard lost their lives.	215	Navy	
1942	Italy	Fiume – A small Italian passenger steamship sunk by the Greek submarine Nereus on 24 September while sailing from Rhodes to Symi. The ship sank in less than 30 seconds, taking 214 of the 287 passengers and crew down with her.	214	Civilian	
1942	Japan	Kirishima – On the night of 14–15 November, in one of only two battleship duels of the Pacific War, Kirishima heavily damaged USS South Dakota before being crippled in turn by the battleship USS Washington. Kirishima capsized and sank in the early morning on 15 November in Ironbottom Sound with the loss of 212 of her crew of 1,360.	212	Navy	
1945	Japan	Momi – On 5 January the Japanese destroyer was sunk by an aircraft launched torpedo and sunk with all hands west of Manila.	211	Navy	
1941	Italy	Vittorio Alfieri – On 28 March the Italian destroyer was disabled by British battleships and sunk by HMS Stuart during the Battle of Cape Matapan. Only 35 of her 245 crew survived.	210	Navy	
1943	United States	USS Maddox – On 10 July, while on antisubmarine patrol, the US destroyer was attacked by a German dive bomber. One of the bombs exploded her after magazine causing her to roll over and sink within 2 minutes. Of her 284 crew, 74 survived.	210	Navy	
1943	Japan	Yūgure – On 20 July, while on a troop transport run to Kolombanara, the Japanese destroyer was bombed and sunk with all hands by U.S. Marine TBF Avenger aircraft from Guadalcanal, north-northwest of Kolombangara. The rescue destroyer Kiyonami was also sunk with no survivors.	210	Navy	
1945	Japan	Nokaze – On 20 February the Japanese destroyer was torpedoed and sunk by the US submarine USS Pargo north of Nha Trang, French Indochina in the South China Sea. The ship exploded and sank with 209 killed while 21 survivors were rescued.	209	Navy	
1944	United Kingdom	Derrycunihy – On 24 June, while transporting troops in support of the Normandy landing, the British transport was sunk. An acoustic or 'Oyster' mine, dropped by one of the nightly Luftwaffe raiders, exploded under the keel and split the ship in two. Of those aboard 183 troops were killed and about 120 others wounded. 25 of the ship's crew were also killed, which was the biggest single loss of life off the Normandy invasion beaches.	208	Military	
1941	Italy	Fabio Filzi – On 13 December the Italian cargo vessel, while sailing in convoy to North Africa, was torpedoed by HMS Upright off Cape San Vito (Taranto). The shifting of her cargo of tanks caused the ship to capsize and sink in only seven minutes, taking 208 men down with her; 143 survived.	208	Military	
1944	Japan	Hayanami – On 7 June the Japanese destroyer was torpedoed and sunk by USS Harder near Tawitawi, 35 nautical miles (65 km) east of Borneo. The destroyer exploded and sank with 208 killed; 45 survivors were rescued by the Japanese destroyer Urakaze.	208	Navy	
1941	Canada	Nerissa – The passenger and cargo steamship was torpedoed and sunk on 30 April by the German submarine U-552. She was the only transport carrying Canadian troops to be lost in World War II. 207 people, soldiers and civilians, were killed.	207	Civilian	
1940	Italy	Espero – On 28 June the Italian destroyer was sunk by cruisers HMAS Sydney, HMS Orion, HMS Neptune, HMS Liverpool and HMS Gloucester in the Battle of the Espero Convoy. 50 men survived out of 255 crew and troops aboard.	205	Navy	
1944	United States	USS Hull – On 18 December, in Typhoon Cobra, the US destroyer capsized and sank. Of the crew aboard 202 were killed and 62 were rescued.	202	Navy	
1942	Japan	Oboro – On 17 October, in an air attack by US Martin B-26 Marauder aircraft 30 nautical miles (56 km) northeast of Kiska, the Japanese destroyer was sunk. A direct bomb hit among munitions aboard caused her to explode and sink leaving only 17 survivors.	202	Navy	
1940	United Kingdom	Abukir – On 28 May, while evacuating military and civilian personnel from Ostend after the Battle of Belgium, the coaster was sunk by German E-boat S34. Of those aboard at least 200 were killed.			
1943	Italy	Quintino Sella – An Italian destroyer torpedoed and sunk off Venice on 11 September by the German E-boat S54. 28 of her crew and an estimated 170–300 fleeing refugees and disbanded soldiers crammed aboard were killed.	200+	Navy	
1943	Japan	Taimei Maru – On 3 March, in the Battle of the Bismarck Sea, the Japanese troop transport was sunk by Allied aircraft. Of those aboard 200 were killed.	200	Military	
1940	Germany	Rio de Janeiro – On 8 April the German troopship was torpedoed and sunk by the Polish submarine ORP Orzeł off Lillesand. About 180 survived with roughly 200 killed.	200	Military	
1943	Italy	Dubac – An Italian steamship heavily damaged by Luftwaffe bombers while evacuating Italian troops from Albania and run aground near Capo d'Otranto on 25 September. About 200 soldiers were killed.	c. 200	Military	
1943	Italy	Leone Pancaldo – An Italian destroyer sunk by Allied air strikes on 30 April while carrying German troops to Tunis. 124 of her 280 crew and 75 of the 247 German troops aboard were killed.	199	Navy	
1943	United Kingdom	HMS Egret – On 27 August, while part of a support group at the Bay of Biscay, the British sloop was attacked by a squadron of 18 Dornier Do 217 aircraft carrying Henschel Hs 293 glide bombs. One of the two covering destroyers HMCS Athabaskan was heavily damaged by a bomb and Egret was sunk with the loss of 194 of her crew and 4 RAF technicians.	198	Navy	
1940	United Kingdom	HMS Jervis Bay – On 5 November the armed merchant cruiser was the sole escort for 37 merchant ships in Convoy HX 84 from Halifax, Nova Scotia to the UK. When the convoy encountered the German heavy cruiser Admiral Scheer, Jervis Bay ordered the merchant ships to scatter while she headed straight for the German ship to draw her fire. Jervis Bay fought until she was set ablaze and sank 755 nautical miles (1,398 km) south-southwest of Reykjavík. Admiral Scheer then sank five merchant ships of the convoy but Jervis Bay's sacrifice gained enough time for the convoy to scatter and the remaining ships to escape. 65 survivors from Jervis Bay were rescued by the neutral Swedish ship Stureholm.	198	Navy	
1940	United Kingdom	HMS Acheron – On 17 December, in night-time post refit trials off the Isle of Wight, the British destroyer sank after striking a mine. The explosion caused major structural damage forward and her own speed drove her under. She sank within four minutes, killing 196 crew and yard workers, who were aboard for the trials. There were 19 survivors.	196	Navy	
1940	Italy	Paganini – The Italian troop transport caught fire and sank on 28 June while carrying troops from Bari to Durazzo. 757 men were rescued but 195 lost their lives.	195	Military	
1942	United Kingdom	HMS Jaguar – The British destroyer was struck by two torpedoes fired by U-652 and sank off Sidi Barrani, Egypt on 26 March with the loss of 3 Officers and 190 of her crew. Eight officers and 45 crew were saved.	193	Navy	
1942	United States	USS Wasp – On 15 September, while in convoy to Guadalcanal, the US aircraft carrier was torpedoed and sunk by the Japanese submarine I-19. Of her crew 193 men were killed and 366 wounded.	193	Navy	
1940	United Kingdom	HMS Exmouth – The destroyer was escorting the cargo ship Cyprian Prince on 21 January when she was sighted by the U-22 and torpedoed. She sank with the loss of all hands and, after sinking Exmouth, U-22 also fired on Cyprian Prince whose Master deemed it too dangerous to rescue survivors.	192	Navy	
1944	Japan	Mogami – On 25 October, after the Battle of the Surigao Strait, the Japanese cruiser was scuttled after being heavily damaged in battle. 700 survivors rescued but 192 crew were killed.	192	Navy	
1944	United States	USS Cooper – On 3 December, in the Battle of Ormoc Bay, the US destroyer was torpedoed and sunk by the Japanese destroyer Take. She suffered an explosion on her starboard side, then broke in two, and sank within a minute. Of the crew aboard 168 survived but 191 were killed.	191	Navy	
1945	Japan	Isuzu – On 7 April, 60 miles (97 km) northwest of Bima, the Japanese cruiser sunk after being torpedoed by USS Gabilan and USS Charr. Her captain and 450 crew were rescued; 190 were killed.	190	Navy	
1942	Japan	Hiei – In the evening of 13 November, during the Battle of Guadalcanal, the Japanese battleship was crippled by enemy ship fire. The next morning, with her steering jammed and circling, Hiei was attacked by American Army B-17 Flying Fortress bombers along with Grumman TBF Avenger torpedo-bombers. The decision was made later on 14 November to scuttle her. In all 188 of her crew of 1,360 were killed.	188	Navy	
1942	Japan	Nenohi – On 4 July the Japanese destroyer was torpedoed and sunk by USS Triton while escorting the seaplane tender Kamikawa Maru southeast of Attu, near Agattu Island. She capsized two minutes after being hit and sank in five minutes with 188 being killed and 38 survivors.	188	Navy	
1942	Italy	Muzio Attendolo – On 4 December the Italian cruiser was bombed and sunk by B-24 aircraft while at Naples. She hit bottom and rolled on her side after being hit by one or two bombs. An estimated 188 were killed and 86 were wounded.	188	Navy	
1943	Italy	Corsaro – On 9 January the Italian destroyer, while escorting the cargo ship Ines Corrado from Naples to Bizerte together with the destroyer Maestrale, hit two mines laid by the minelayer HMS Abdiel (after Maestrale had already been damaged by another mine) and quickly sank. 187 men were lost, 48 were rescued.	187	Navy	
1939	France	Pluton – On 13 September the French minelaying cruiser was sunk in an accidental explosion at Casablanca, French Morocco, while unloading still-fused naval mines. 186 people were killed and 120 others were injured.	186	Navy	
1944	United States	USS Johnston – On 25 October, in the Battle off Samar, the US destroyer was sunk by naval gunfire. From Johnston's 327 officers and men, 141 were saved.	186	Navy	
1943	Japan	Sendai – On 3 November, in the Battle of Empress Augusta Bay, the Japanese cruiser was sunk by US Navy cruisers. Of the crew aboard 184 were killed and 311 were rescued.	184	Navy	
1944	United Kingdom	HMS Laforey – While on anti-submarine patrol on 30 March the destroyer was sunk by three torpedoes fired from the German submarine U-223 in a surface battle. She sank quickly resulting with the loss of most of her company including her captain. Of the 247 aboard, 65 survived.	182	Navy	
1942	United States	USS Meredith – On 15 October the destroyer was attacked by 38 Japanese bombers, torpedo planes, and escort fighters from Zuikaku. She shot down three of her attackers but was struck by an estimated 14 bombs and seven torpedoes. She rolled over and sank in 10 minutes with 81 of a crew of 261 surviving the attack and delayed rescue.	180	Navy	
1940	Italy	Leopardi – On 14 August the Italian steamship, while carrying Libyan colonial troops from Benghazi to Derna, struck a mine laid by HMS Rorqual and sank. 176 men were lost and 172 survived.	176	Military	
1942	United States	USS Sims – On 7 May, in the Battle of the Coral Sea, the destroyer was sunk by Japanese aircraft. Three 250 kg (551 lb) bombs hit her. Two exploded in the engine room, and within minutes she buckled amidships and began to sink stern first. As she sank there was a great explosion that raised what was left of her almost 15 feet (5 m) out of the water. Of the crew aboard 176 were killed.	176	Navy	
1944	United Kingdom	HMS Boadicea – On 13 June she was sunk while escorting a convoy of merchant ships in Convoy EBC 8 from Milford Haven, Wales in support of the Normandy invasion; only 12 of her 188 crew survived. She may have been hit by an Henschel Hs 293 glide bomb launched by a Dornier Do 217. However, official British reports attribute the sinking to a torpedo launched by a Junkers Ju 88 aircraft that hid itself in a formation of RAF Bristol Beaufighters.	176	Navy	
1940	United Kingdom	HMS Foylebank – On 5 July the British anti-aircraft ship sank after being bombed by German aircraft the previous day. On 4 July she was attacked by 26 Stuka diver bombers and an estimated 22 bombs hit the ship leaving her listing to port shrouded in smoke. Out of 298 crew 176 were killed and many wounded.	176	Navy	
1940	Norway	HNoMS Eidsvold – On 9 April the Norwegian coastal defence ship was torpedoed and sunk by the German destroyer Z21 Wilhelm Heidkamp. Eidsvold was hit by two or three torpedoes broke in two, possibly from a magazine explosion, and sank in seconds with her propellers still turning. Six her the crew were rescued; 175 were killed.	175	Navy	
1944	Japan	Uzuki – On 12 December, while escorting a troop convoy from Manila to Ormoc, the Japanese destroyer was torpedoed by the PT boats PT-490 and PT-492 50 nautical miles (93 km) northeast of Cebu. Of the crew aboard 175 were killed and 59 survived.	175	Navy	
1943	Italy	Bombardiere – On 17 January the Italian destroyer, while escorting the cargo ship Mario Roselli from Bizerte to Palermo together with the destroyer Legionario, was torpedoed by the submarine HMS United and quickly sank with the loss of 175 of her 224 crew.	175	Navy	
1940	United Kingdom	HMS Forfar – On 2 December, while on the Northern Patrol, the armed merchant cruiser was torpedoed and sunk by U-99. Of 194 aboard, 173 were killed.	173	Navy	
1943	Italy	Città di Genova – On 21 January the Italian armed merchant cruiser, sailing from Patras to Bari with 132 crew members, 200 military passengers and 158 Greek prisoners, was torpedoed by HMS Tigris and sank in a few minutes. 173 men were lost.	173	Navy	
1941	Italy	Giosuè Carducci – On 28 March the Italian destroyer was disabled by fire from British battleships and sunk with torpedoes by destroyer HMS Havock during the Battle of Cape Matapan, with the loss of 171 of her 206 crew.	171	Navy	
1943	Italy	Saetta – On 3 February the Italian destroyer struck a mine and immediately sank, while trying to give help to the torpedo boat Uragano which had been mined herself shortly before. Only 39 of her 209 crew survived.	170	Navy	
1941	Japan	Hayate – On 11 December, while part of a group of ships attacking Wake Island, the Japanese destroyer exploded and sank after being hit by coastal shore artillery. She sustained at least two direct hits to her magazines causing her to explode and sink within two minutes, killing all 168 hands.	168	Navy	
1943	United States	USS Helena – On 6 July, in the Battle of Kula Gulf, the US cruiser was hit by three torpedoes, split in two and sank. Of Helena's nearly 900 crew 168 were killed.	168	Navy	
1943	United States	USS De Haven – On 1 February, while assisting the establishment of a beachhead at Marovo Island on Guadalcanal, the US destroyer was sunk by Japanese aircraft. She was hit by three bombs and further damaged by a near miss. One bomb hit the superstructure squarely killing the commanding officer instantly and she sank about 2 nautical miles (3.7 km) east of Savo Island. Her losses were 167 killed and 38 wounded.	167	Navy	
1942	Italy	Duino – On 8 February the Italian passenger steamship sank after hitting a mine in the Southern Adriatic Sea. 45 survivors were rescued after three days, but 165 men were lost.	165	Civilian	
1943	United States	Timothy Pickering – on 13 July, the Liberty ship was bombed and set on fire in the Mediterranean Sea off Avola, Sicily (37°00′N 15°21′E) by Luftwaffe aircraft. A total of 127 of the 128 British troops, 16 of the 23 gunners, and 22 of the 43 crewmen on board were killed.	165	Navy	
1942	United States	USS Barton – on 13 November, in the Battle of Guadalcanal, the US destroyer was torpedoed and sunk by the Japanese destroyer Amatsukaze. Barton was hit by two torpedoes, broke in two, and sank within minutes. Of the crew aboard 164 were killed while 42 were rescued.	164	Navy	
1944	United Kingdom	HMS Janus – On 23 January the destroyer was struck by one bomb or torpedo dropped by a German aircraft and sank off the Anzio beachhead in Italy. Janus took 20 minutes to sink. 162 of her crew were killed; 80 survived.	162	Navy	
1945	United States	USS Halligan – On 26 March the US destroyer was severely damaged and beached after striking a mine. She had hit a moored mine head-on, causing her forward magazines to explode and destroy the forward section of the ship to the forward stack including the bridge. Over half of her crew of 300 were killed.	162	Navy	
1942	United Kingdom	HMS Martin – On the morning of 10 November, while part of the covering force to the landings at Algiers and Oran, the destroyer was torpedoed by U-431, causing her to blow up and sink. Another destroyer, HMS Quentin, rescued four officers and 59 ratings.	161	Navy	
1941	United Kingdom	HMS Cossack – On 24 October, while escorting a convoy from Gibraltar to the United Kingdom, the British destroyer was struck by a torpedo fired by the German submarine U-563 killing 159 of her crew. She was taken in tow by a tug from Gibraltar on 25 October but the weather worsened and the tow was slipped on 26 October. She sank in the Atlantic west of Gibraltar on 27 October 1941.	159	Navy	
1942	Italy	Emanuele Pessagno – On 29 May the Italian destroyer, while escorting a convoy to Libya, was torpedoed by HMS Turbulent, exploded and quickly sank with the loss of 159 of her 245 crew.	159	Navy	
1942	Italy	Ariosto – On 15 February HMS P38 torpedoed the Italian steamship, sailing in a convoy from Tripoli to Palermo and carrying 410 people, including 294 British POWs. The ship broke in two-halves, which later sank, and 158 people, including 138 POWs, were lost.	158	Military	
1945	United States	USS Drexler – On 28 May the US destroyer was sunk by a kamikaze attack while bound for Okinawa. She was hit by two planes with the impact from the first plane had cut off all her power and started large gasoline fires. The second impact rolled her on to her beam ends and caused her to sink in less than 50 seconds, killing 158 and wounding 52.	158	Navy	
1940	United Kingdom	HMS Daring – While escorting Convoy HN 12 from Norway the destroyer was torpedoed on 18 February U-23. Daring capsized and sank very quickly after having her stern blown off and 157 of the ship's company were killed. The five survivors were rescued by the submarine HMS Thistle which had seen the attack.	157	Navy	
1944	Japan	Naganami – On 11 November, in Ormoc Bay west of Leyte, the Japanese destroyer was sunk by an Allied aircraft attack. An explosion amidships broke the ship in two with 156 of her crew being killed and 72 survivors rescued.	156	Navy	
1941	Italy	Calitea – The Italian troopship was torpedoed by HMS Talisman on 11 December, while sailing in convoy from Brindisi to Benghazi via Argostoli and Navarino, and sank in less than two minutes. 155 men were lost out of 382 troops and crew aboard.	155	Military	
1941	Japan	Kisaragi – On 11 December, in the Battle of Wake Island, the Japanese destroyer was sunk with all hands. She was sailing away from the engagement when it came under air attack by four F4F Wildcat fighter planes from Wake armed with 100-pound bombs. One bomb hit Kisaragi's stern which was packed with depth charges. This caused the ship to explode and sink with all hands about 30 miles (48 km) southwest of Wake Island	154	Navy	
1944	Japan	Akikaze – On 3 November the Japanese destroyer was torpedoed and sunk west of Cape Bolinao, Luzon. USS Pintado fired a spread of torpedoes at the Japanese carrier Jun'yō but Akikaze intercepted them sacrificing herself to save the carrier. Akikaze sank with all hands.	154	Navy	
1944	Japan	Ōi – On 19 July the Japanese cruiser was torpedoed and sunk by the U.S. submarine USS Flasher in the South China Sea. The destroyer Shikinami, which had attempted to tow the stricken cruiser to safety before she broke in two and sank, rescued 369 crew but 153 crew were killed.	153	Navy	
1944	Japan	Sazanami – On 12 January the Japanese destroyer departed Rabaul to join a tanker convoy en route from Palau to Truk. She was torpedoed by USS Albacore sinking 300 nautical miles (560 km) southeast of Yap. Of her crew 153 died while 89 survivors were rescued by her sister ship the Japanese destroyer Akebono.	153	Navy	
1941	United Kingdom	Aguila – On 19 August the British passenger ship was in Convoy OG 71 when U-201 torpedoed her in mid-Atlantic. Her passengers included 87 Royal Navy personnel and the Convoy Commodore. 152 people were lost; 16 survived.	152	Civilian	
1945	United States	USS Morrison – On 4 May, in the Battle of Okinawa, the US destroyer was sunk after being hit by four kamikaze aircraft. After the fourth hit the destroyer, heavily damaged, began to list sharply to starboard. Two explosions occurred almost simultaneously that lifted her bow in the air. She then sank so quickly that most men below decks were killed. 152 men were killed.	152	Navy	
1945	United States	USS Twiggs – On 16 June, in the Battle of Okinawa, the US destroyer was attacked by a low-flying plane that dropped a torpedo which hit her port side exploding her number two magazine. The plane then circled and completed its kamikaze mission in a suicide crash. The explosion enveloped the destroyer in flames and within an hour she sank. 152 were dead or missing, but despite the hazard of exploding ammunition from the blazing ship, 188 survivors were rescued.	152	Navy	
1945	Germany	Orion – On 4 May, while transporting refugees to Copenhagen, the German auxiliary cruiser was hit by bombs from Soviet aircraft off Swinemünde and sank. Of the more than 4,000 people aboard, 150 died.	150	Navy	
1941	Italy	Città di Bastia – On 27 September the Italian troop transport was torpedoed and sunk by HMS Tetrarch with the loss of 150 of the 582 men aboard.	150	Military	
1943	Italy	Sperone – An Italian naval tugboat, used to ferry naval personnel in the Gulf of Taranto, which sank after hitting a German mine on 22 September. Nearly all 150 men aboard were killed.	c. 150	Navy	
1941	Italy	Monrosa – The Italian steamship was torpedoed and sunk by HMS Triumph on 25 October while carrying troops and supplies from Piraeus to Crete. 148 of the 265 men aboard were killed.	148	Military	
1943	Japan	Numakaze – On 18 December the Japanese destroyer was sunk while chasing the wake of US submarine USS Grayback. She was hit by a torpedo, blew up, and sank east-northeast of Naha, Okinawa with the loss of all hands.	148	Navy	
1943	United Kingdom	City of Pretoria – was a British steam merchant that was travelling unescorted in the North Atlantic when she was torpedoed by U-172. She exploded and sank northwest of the Azores with all aboard killed.	145	Civilian	
1943	United Kingdom	Hoihow – On 2 July the passenger ship (2,798 GRT, 1933) was torpedoed and sunk in the Indian Ocean 103 nautical miles (191 km) north west of Mauritius (19°30′S 55°30′E) by U-181 (Kriegsmarine) with the loss of 145 of the 149 people aboard.	145	Civilian	
1944	United States	USS St. Lo – On 25 October, in the Battle of Leyte Gulf, the aircraft carrier was sunk after a kamikaze aircraft attack. One Mitsubishi A6M2 Zero crashed into her flight deck. Its bomb penetrated the flight deck and exploded on the port side of the hangar deck where aircraft were in the process of being refueled and rearmed. A gasoline fire erupted followed by six secondary explosions including detonations of the ship's torpedo and bomb magazine. The carrier was engulfed in flame and sank 30 minutes later. Of 889 men aboard 113 were killed or missing and about 30 others died of wounds.	143	Navy	
1942	Japan	Furutaka – On 12 October, in the Battle of Cape Esperance, the Japanese cruiser sank after being shelled by US ships and torpedoed by the destroyer USS Duncan. She sank stern first and 514 survivors were rescued but 143 were killed.	143	Navy	
1940	Canada	HMCS Margaree – On 22 October the destroyer was escorting Convoy OL8 bound for Canada when she collided with the British cargo ship Port Fairy. The cargo ship rescued six officers and 28 ratings; the other 142 of Margaree's complement were lost.	142	Navy	
1943	Italy	Antoniotto Usodimare – On 8 June the Italian destroyer, while escorting a convoy from Naples to Tripoli, was torpedoed by the Italian submarine Alagi in a friendly fire incident. The destroyer immediately broke in two and sank in a few minutes off Cape Bon. 141 of the 306 people aboard (including a small group of naval officers and ratings on passage) were killed.	141	Navy	
1942	United States	USS Atik – On 27 March, the Q-ship, disguised as the merchant ship Carolyn, was patrolling in the Atlantic Ocean east of Virginia. While in battle against the German submarine U-123, Attik was torpedoed on her starboard side and she began sinking by the bow. Whilst the crew was evacuating, Attik exploded. None of her crew survived.	141	Navy	
1941	Italy	Lampo – On 16 April the Italian destroyer was disabled and grounded during the Battle of the Tarigo Convoy. 141 of her 205 crew were killed. The ship was later refloated and repaired, only to be sunk by aircraft on 30 April 1943.	141	Navy	
1941	Italy	Fulmine – On 9 November the Italian destroyer was sunk by Force K during the Battle of the Duisburg Convoy. 141 men went down with the ship, perished in the sea or were killed the following morning when the rescuing destroyer Libeccio was torpedoed and sunk by HMS Upholder.	141	Navy	
1942	United States	USS Hornet – On 27 October, in the Battle of the Santa Cruz Islands, the US aircraft carrier was sunk after being bombed and torpedoed by Japanese forces. After being abandoned, following a scuttling attempt by US forces, the carrier was sunk by Japanese torpedoes. Of 2,919 crew, 140 were killed.	140	Navy	
1941	Turkey	Refah – A cargo steamship carrying 171 Turkish military personnel (150 seamen and 21 airmen) and 28 crew from Mersin to Egypt was sunk on 23 June by a torpedo fired by a Vichy France submarine. The vessel belonging to neutral Turkey was mistaken for a vessel of the Free French Forces. 32 people survived.	139	Military	
1941	United Kingdom	HMS Bonaventure – On 31 March, while escorting a convoy from Greece to Alexandria, the British cruiser was torpedoed and sunk by the Italian submarine Ambra. 139 of her complement were killed and 310 rescued.	139	Navy	
1942	Newfoundland	Caribou – A passenger ferry, torpedoed by U-69, sank in the Cabot Strait in the night of 14–15 October. 138 died out of 46 sailors and 206 civilian and military passengers.	138	Civilian	
1941	Italy	Alvise Da Mosto – On 1 December the Italian destroyer, while trying to protect the disabled tanker Iridio Mantovani, was engaged and sunk by HMS Aurora, HMS Penelope and HMS Lively of Force K. 138 men were killed, while 135 survived.	138	Navy	
1944	Japan	Kuma – On 11 January the Japanese cruiser, after leaving Penang with the destroyer Uranami on anti-submarine warfare exercises, was torpedoed and sunk by the British submarine HMS Tally-Ho. Of the 450 aboard 138 were killed; survivors were rescued by Uranami.	138	Navy	
1942	Italy	Lupo – The Italian torpedo boat was attacked and sunk by destroyers HMS Kelvin, HMS Javelin, HMS Nubian and HMS Jervis in the Gulf of Gabes on 2 December, while rescuing survivors of the disabled steamship Veloce which she had been escortin to Tripoli. 135 of the 164 men on board Lupo (crew and a few troops on passage) were killed.	135	Navy	
1943	Italy	Perseo – An Italian torpedo boat sunk by HMS Paladin, HMS Petard and HMS Nubian on 4 May in the Battle of the Campobasso Convoy. 133 crew members and troops on passage lost their lives, while 83 were rescued.	133	Navy	
1940	Italy	Artigliere – On 12 October the Italian destroyer was disabled by the light cruiser HMS Ajax during the battle of Cape Passero, and later sunk by the heavy cruiser HMS York. 132 of her crew were killed and 122 rescued.	132	Navy	
1942	United Kingdom	HMS Eagle – On 11 August, in Operation Pedestal, the British aircraft carrier was hit by four torpedoes from the German submarine U-73 and sank within four minutes 70 nautical miles (130 km) south of Cape Salinas. The destroyers HMS Laforey and Lookout and the tug Jaunty rescued 67 officers and 862 ratings. 131 officers and ratings, mainly from the ship's machinery spaces, were killed.	131	Navy	
1942	United States	USS Monssen – On 13 November in the Naval Battle of Guadalcanal the US destroyer was set ablaze and sunk by naval gunfire. 130 of her crew were killed.	130	Navy	
1944	United Kingdom	HMS Quorn – On 3 August the British destroyer was sunk off the Normandy coast in a heavy attack on the British assault area by a force of E-boats, explosive motorboats, human torpedoes and low flying aircraft. Those crewn who survived the attack spent up to eight hours in the water before being rescued, and many died. Four officers and 126 ratings were lost.	130	Navy	
1944	United States	USS Gambier Bay – On 25 October the Casablanca-class escort carrier was sunk in the Battle off Samar during the battle of Leyte Gulf after helping to turn back a much larger attacking Japanese surface force. She was the only American aircraft carrier sunk by enemy gunfire during World War II.	130	Navy	
1943	Japan	Mogamigawa Maru – Convoy 3724: the aircraft transport was torpedoed and sunk on 31 July north of Truk by USS Pogy (United States Navy). 130 of her 730 crew and passengers were killed.	130		
1941	United Kingdom	HMS Kelly – On 23 May, in the evacuation of Crete, the British destroyer was sunk by Luftwaffe aircraft, killing half her crew.	128	Navy	
1944	Canada	HMCS Athabaskan – On 29 April the Royal Canadian Navy destroyer was torpedoed and sunk in the English Channel. Of the crew aboard 128 men were killed, 83 taken prisoner and 44 rescued.	128	Navy	
1944	United Kingdom	HMS Aldenham – On 14 December, after leading a Royal Navy force in a bombardment mission against targets on the island of Pag, the British destroyer was sunk by a mine. Of those aboard, 126 crew and two Yugoslav Partisans were killed.	128	Navy	
1945	United States	USS Luce – On 4 May, in the Battle of Okinawa, the US destroyer was sunk by a kamikaze attack. She shot down one attacker but the explosion from the bomb it carried caused a power failure. Unable to bring her guns to bear in time she was struck in the aft section by the second kamikaze. Her port engine was knocked out, engineering spaces flooded and the rudder jammed. She listed heavily to starboard and the order to abandon ship was given. Moments later she sank in a violent explosion killing 126 of her 312 officers and men.	126	Navy	
1942	Sarawak	Vyner Brooke – On 14 February the Sarawak royal yacht was evacuating Australian Army nurses and wounded Allied troops on the penultimate day of the Battle of Singapore when Japanese aircraft bombed and sank her just east of Sumatra. Many patients, crew and 22 nurses survived and came ashore on Bangka Island, which was held by Japanese forces. The survivors sought to surrender, but Japanese troops massacred them on the beach. There were only two survivors.	125	Civilian	
1942	Italy	Loreto – On 13 October in the Tyrrhenian Sea the Italian cargo ship was torpedoed and sunk by the Royal Navy submarine HMS Unruffled. 123 of the 400 British Indian Army prisoners of war aboard Loreto were killed, as well as one of the 50 Italian crew.	124	Military	
1939	United Kingdom	HMS Duchess – On 12 December, while escorting the battleship HMS Barham back to the UK, the two Royal Navy ships collided off the Mull of Kintyre in heavy fog. Duchess capsized and her depth charges exploded, killing 124 of her crew.	124	Navy	
1941	Italy	Folgore – On 2 December the Italian destroyer was sunk by the Force Q during the Battle of Skerki Bank. 124 men perished with the ship.	124	Navy	
1941	United Kingdom	Avoceta – On 25 September, the British passenger ship was in Convoy HG 73 when U-203 torpedoed her in mid-Atlantic. Most of her 67 passengers were British refugees from the fall of France who had been denied leave to remain in neutral Spain and Portugal. 123 people were lost; 43 survived, including the Convoy Commodore.	123	Civilian	
1941	Italy	Vega – On 10 January, during Operation Excess, the Italian torpedo boat attacked a British convoy but was sunk by cruiser HMS Bonaventure and destroyer HMS Hereward. Only six of the 128 crew members survived.	122	Navy	
1942	Japan	Asagiri – On 24 August, while transporting troops to Guadalcanal, the Japanese destroyer was sunk by US aircraft. She was struck by a direct hit by a bomb on her torpedo launchers by United States Marine Corps SBD Dauntless dive bombers from Henderson Field. The explosion killed 122 men, including 60 ground troops, and sank Asagiri near Santa Isabel Island, 60 nautical miles (110 km) north-northeast of Savo Island.	122	Navy	
1940	Italy	Italian cruiser Bartolomeo Colleoni – On 19 July the Italian light cruiser was disabled by the light cruiser HMAS Sydney and finished with torpedoes by destroyers HMS Havock and Ilex during the Battle of Cape Spada. 121 of her 643 crew were killed.	121	Navy	
1941	Japan	Sagiri – On 24 December, about 35 nautical miles (65 km) off Kuching, the Japanese destroyer was torpedoed by the Dutch submarine HNLMS K XVI. Her aft magazine caught fire and she exploded and sank killing 121 of her crew. Some 120 survivors were rescued by her sister ship, the Shirakumo.	121	Navy	
1943	Italy	Tagliamento – On 22 April the Italian steamship, carrying ammunitions to Sardinia, was torpedoed by HMS Saracen and blew up. On board were at least 120 crew and soldiers; there were no survivors.	120+	Military	
1943	Japan	Hatsuyuki – On 17 July, while docked at Shortlands unloading passengers, the Japanese destroyer was attacked by US aircraft. A bomb exploded the after magazine sinking her in shallow water with 120 dead (including 38 passengers) and 36 wounded.	120	Navy	
1942	United Kingdom	HMS Bramble – On 31 December, in the Battle of the Barents Sea, the British minesweeper was sunk with all hands by naval gunfire. 120 people were killed.	120	Navy	
1943	Italy	San Marco – An Italian coastal passenger steamship, sunk by Allied planes in Istria on 9 September. 120 passengers and crew were killed and 60 wounded.	120	Civilian	
1942	United Kingdom	HMS Firedrake – On 17 December, while escorting Convoy ON 153, the British destroyer was torpedoed by U-211 and sunk. Of the crew aboard 118 were killed and 27 rescued.	118	Navy	
1942	Italy	Nicoloso Da Recco – The Italian destroyer was shelled and severely damaged by HMS Aurora, HMS Sirius, HMS Argonaut, HMAS Quiberon and HMS Quentin on 2 December, during the Battle of Skerki Bank. Despite a massive fire caused by the deflagration of her magazines, the ship was saved and repaired, but 118 of her crew were killed and many more suffered serious burns.	118	Navy	
1939	United Kingdom	Athenia – On 3 September, just hours after Britain declared war on Germany, U-boat U-30 sank Athenia mistaking her for an armed merchant cruiser. Of the 1,103 civilians the passenger liner was carrying, 118 passengers and crew were killed.	118	Civilian	
1943	Italy	Ardente – On 12 January the Italian torpedo boat, en route from Bizerta to Palermo, was accidentally rammed by the destroyer Grecale, sailing on the opposite direction. Ardente caught fire and sank, with 118 dead and 44 survivors.	118	Navy	
1942	United States	USS Preston – On 14 November, in the Battle of Guadalcanal, the US destroyer was set ablaze and sunk by naval gunfire. After being hit multiple times she rolled on her side, floated for another 10 minutes with her bow in the air and then sank taking 116 of her crew with her.	116	Navy	
1942	United States	USS Pillsbury – In a night surface action on 2 March she was overtaken by two Japanese cruisers of Cruiser Division 4. The Japanese cruisers Takao and Atago engaged and sank her with all hands.	116	Navy	
1941	United Kingdom	HMS Calcutta – On 1 June the British cruiser was sunk by German Junkers Ju 88 bombers about 100 nautical miles (190 km) off Alexandria, Egypt. Of the 400 aboard 116 were killed.	116	Navy	
1943	United States	USS McKean – On 17 November the US destroyer was sunk by an aerial torpedo near Empress Augusta Bay. It struck her starboard side causing explosions in her after magazine and depth charge spaces and rupturing fuel oil tanks. She began to sink by the stern with 64 of her crew and 52 of the Marines aboard being killed.	116	Navy	
1941	United States	USS Reuben James – On 31 October, while escorting a convoy near Iceland, the US destroyer was torpedoed by U-552. She was hit forward by a torpedo and her entire bow was blown off when a magazine exploded. The bow sank immediately while the aft section floated for five minutes before going down. Of her 159 crew, 44 survived.	115	Navy	
1943	Italy	Uragano – On 3 February the Italian torpedo boat, while escorting a convoy returning from Tunisia, struck a mine which blew off her stern and sank after four hours in the Sicilian Channel. After two days at sea on life rafts, 15 of her 129 crew were rescued.	114	Navy	
1944	Japan	Tanikaze – On 9 June the Japanese destroyer was torpedoed and sunk by USS Harder in Sibutu Passage, near Tawitawi, 90 nautical miles (170 km) southwest of Basilan. It was reported that 114 crew were killed and 126 survivors were rescued by Urakaze. Urakaze was sunk five months later by Sealion with all hands including several survivors from Tanikaze.	114	Navy	
1942	United Kingdom	HMS Achates – On 31 December, in the Battle of the Barents Sea, the British destroyer was sunk by naval gunfire. Of her crew, 113 were killed and 81 rescued.	113	Navy	
1940	United Kingdom	HMS Hunter – On 10 April, in the First Battle of Narvik, the British destroyer was sunk by German destroyer fire, along with a possible torpedo hit, and from being accidentally rammed astern by HMS Hotspur. Hunter capsized and sank, killing 112 of her crew of 146.	112	Navy	
1941	Norway	Barøy – On 13 September the Norwegian passenger ship was sunk by British aircraft west of Tranøy Lighthouse. A torpedo blew open her hull, knocked out her electrical power and quickly flooded her. She sank too quickly for her lifeboats to be launched; her passengers and crew could only jump into the icy water. 59 of her 68 Norwegian passengers and 18 of her 26 crew were killed. Of 37 German soldiers aboard, two survived.	112	Civilian	
1945	United States	USS Underhill – On 24 July the US destroyer escort was sunk by a Kaiten manned torpedo off Luzon. Of those aboard 112 were killed and 122 survived the attack and sinking.	112	Navy	
1943	Italy	Grecale – On 12 January the Italian destroyer, carrying German troops from Palermo to Bizerta, accidentally rammed by the torpedo boat Ardente, sailing on the opposite direction. Grecale was able to make back to port with heavy damage but lost her bow; eight crewmembers and more than 100 German soldiers were killed.	c. 110	Navy	
1944	United States	USS Truxtun – On 18 February the US destroyer was wrecked at Chambers Cove off St. Lawrence in a storm with 110 deaths.	110	Navy	
1942	United Kingdom	HMS Grove – On 12 June, while on return passage from Tobruk to Alexandria following a convoy escort, the British destroyer was torpedoed and sunk by the German submarine U-77. Of the 189 crew, 110 were killed.	110	Navy	
1942	Japan	Fubuki – On 11 October, in the Battle of Cape Esperance, the Japanese destroyer was sunk by gunfire from a US cruiser and destroyer group off Cape Esperance. 110 of her crew were killed; 109 survivors were later rescued by the U.S. destroyers.	110	Navy	
1944	Japan	Minazuki – On 6 June, after departing Tawi-tawi with a tanker convoy to Balikpapan on Borneo, the Japanese destroyer Minazuki was torpedoed and sunk by the US submarine USS Harder off Tawi-tawi. Of her 154-man crew 109 were killed.	109	Navy	
1943	United States	USS Brownson – On 26 December, while screening the landings on Cape Gloucester, New Britain, the US destroyer was hit by two bombs from a Japanese dive bomber. The bombs struck starboard of her centerline near her number two stack. A great explosion followed and the entire structure above the main deck, as well as the deck plating, was gone. She listed 10 to 15 degrees to starboard and settled rapidly amidships with her bow and stern tilted upward. 108 of her crew were killed.	108	Navy	
1944	United States	USS Princeton – On 24 October, in the Battle of Leyte Gulf, the US aircraft carrier was sunk by Japanese aircraft. After being bombed she exploded and sank with the loss of 108 of her crew.	108	Navy	
1940	United Kingdom	Domala – On 2 March the British cargo liner was bombed by German aircraft setting her afire. The order to abandon ship was given but the bomber machine-gunned people attempting to escape by lifeboat. 108 of the 291 people aboard were killed. After this, Domala was rebuilt as a cargo ship and renamed Empire Attendant. On 15 July 1942 she was torpedoed and sunk by the German submarine U-582 with the loss of all 59 aboard.	108	Civilian	
1942	Netherlands	HNLMS Isaac Sweers – Sunk on 13 November	108	Navy	
1941	United Kingdom	HMS Salvia – On 24 December, after rescuing survivors from the sinking of the British prison ship Shuntien, the Royal Navy corvette was torpedoed and sunk by U-568 in the Mediterranean off Egypt. One of four torpedoes hit Salvia breaking her in two and spilling her heavy black bunker oil, which caught fire. Her stern section rapidly sank followed by her bow section a few minutes later. There were no survivors from the 106 crew or the unknown number of survivors from Shuntien.	106–206+	Navy	
1943	Italy	Santa Lucia – A small Italian passenger steamship, in service in the Pontine Islands, sunk on 24 July by torpedo bombers. Four people survived out of 110 aboard.	106	Civilian	
1943	Italy	Rovereto – An Italian steamship which blew up on 6 April after being hit by B-24 bombers while sailing in a convoy with supplies to Tunisia. 106 of the 117 men aboard were killed.	106	Military	
1943	Italy	Vincenzo Gioberti – On 9 August, the Oriani-class destroyer was torpedoed and sunk in the Mediterranean Sea off La Spezia (44°04′N 09°32′E) by HMS Simoom (Royal Navy). 105 crew were killed. There were 171 survivors.	105	Navy	
1941	United Kingdom	HMS Exmoor – On 25 February the destroyer, was escorting a coastal convoy in the North Sea when E-boats attacked off Lowestoft. Exmoor suffered an explosion aft with major structural damage and ruptured fuel supply line. A fire soon broke out which spread rapidly and the destroyer capsized and sank in 10 minutes. Of the 146 aboard 104 were killed.	104	Navy	
1944	Japan	Shiratsuyu – On the night of 14 June the Japanese destroyer collided with the Japanese tanker Seiyo Maru 90 nautical miles (170 km) southeast of Surigao Strait and sank. Her depth charges exploded among the survivors. Of 180 crew, 104 were killed.	104	Navy	
1943	United States	USCGC Escanaba (WPG-77) - At 0510 on 13 June, a large sheet of flame and dense smoke were seen rising from the Escanaba, though no explosion was heard by the other ships in the convoy. She sank at 0513, going down so quickly that she did not have time to send any distress signals. Storis and Raritan were ordered to investigate and rescue survivors while the rest of the convoy began zigzagging and steering evasive courses to avoid enemy submarines. Although Storis and Raritan were able to arrive on the scene within ten minutes, only two survivors and one body could be found.	103	Coast Guard	
1944	United States	USS Reid – On 11 December, off the west coast of Leyte, the US destroyer was sunk by a kamikaze attack. After being struck by multiple planes, the seventh came in from astern, strafed her and crashed into her port quarter. Its bomb exploded in her after magazine, blowing her apart. As the stern opened up she rolled violently then laid over on her starboard side and dove to the bottom at 600 fathoms (3,600 ft; 1,100 m). She sank in less than two minutes, killing 103 crew.	103	Navy	
1943	Italy	Cigno – An Italian torpedo boat sunk by HMS Paladin and HMS Pakenham on 16 April in the Battle of the Cigno Convoy. 103 of her crew were killed.	103	Navy	
1944	Japan	Uranami – On 26 October, while in convoy crossing the Jintotolo Channel between Masbate and Panay, the Japanese destroyer was sunk by US aircraft. Uranami took two bombs and several rockets killing 103 crew before sinking 12 nautical miles (22 km) southeast of Masbate	103	Navy	
1941	United Kingdom	Umona – On 30 March, while sailing unescorted off Sierra Leone, the passenger and cargo liner was hit by two torpedoes fired by U-124, sinking her 90 nautical miles (170 km) southwest of Freetown. Her master, 87 crew and 14 passengers were killed. Three survivors were rescued a week later; two more were rescued on 12 April.	102	Civilian	
1943	Italy	Francesco Stocco – An Italian torpedo boat sunk by German Junkers Ju 87 bombers off Corfu on 24 September, with the loss of 102 of her 121 crew.	102	Navy	
1940	Norway	HNoMS Norge – On 9 April the Norwegian coastal defense ship was sunk in battle with a group of German destroyers in Narvik harbor. 90 of the crew were rescued from the freezing water but 101 were killed in the battle which had lasted less than 20 minutes.	101	Navy	
1942	Japan	Mizuho – on 1 May the Japanese seaplane carrier was torpedoed and sunk by the US submarine USS Drum 40 nautical miles (74 km) off Omaezaki, Japan. She capsized and sank on 2 May 1942 with 101 killed and 472 survivors.	101	Navy	
1940	United Kingdom	HMS Afridi – On 1 May, while escorting a convoy to Shetland, the British destroyer was bombed and sunk by German aircraft. She capsized and sank bow-first with 53 of her company being killed plus 13 soldiers and 35 of 69 French survivors she had picked up from sunk French destroyer Bison.	101	Navy	
1943	Italy	Dubrovnik – An Italian steamship which was bombed by Luftwaffe planes, capsized and sank off Chioggia on 11 September, with the loss of about 100 people.	c. 100	Military	
1940	United Kingdom	Mohamed Ali El-Kebir – On 7 October, en route from Avonmouth to Gibraltar, the troopship was sunk by U-38 with the loss of 96 people. The destroyer HMS Griffin rescued 766 survivors.	96	Civilian	
1941	United Kingdom	HMS Stanley – On 19 December, while escorting a convoy, the British destroyer was torpedoed and sunk by U-574. Stanley exploded and sank with the loss of all but 25 of her crew.	95	Navy	
1944	Japan	Siberia Maru – On 24 September, while steaming in the Sulu Sea, Philippines as part of a convoy, the Japanese cargo ship was attacked by US aircraft and sunk with the loss of 95 men.	95	Military	
1944	Japan	Kazagumo – On 8 June, while escorting Myōkō and Haguro from Davao to support Biak troop transport operations, the Japanese destroyer was torpedoed and sunk by USS Hake at the mouth of Davao Gulf. Of 228 crew, 95 were killed.	95	Navy	
1945	United States	USS Ommaney Bay – On 4 January the escort carrier was scuttled following an attack by kamikaze aircraft in the Sulu Sea that left her damaged, without power and burning. Exploding munitions on board hindered assistance from nearby ship in fighting the fires and the decision was made to scuttle her. In all 95 out her crew of over 900 were killed.	95	Navy	
1941	Yugoslavia	Sava, Vardar and Morava – On 11 April, during the Axis invasion of Yugoslavia, the crews of the three Yugoslav river monitors scuttled their vessels and were transshipped to two tugboats, one of which was destroyed after a bridge fell onto it, killing 95 of the 110 men aboard.	95	Navy	
1942	United States	USS Pollux – On 18 February the stores ship grounded in a storm at Lawn Point off Newfoundland and was wrecked with 93 deaths.	93	Navy	
1944	United States	USS Rich – On 8 June, in support of the Normandy invasion, the US destroyer escort was sunk after striking mines. After the detonation of a mine off her starboard side that caused no damage, a second mine exploded beneath her and blew off her stern. Shortly after a third mine exploded wrecking the forward section of the ship. Of her crew 91 were killed outright or died of wounds after their rescue. Rich was the only US destroyer escort lost in the invasion force.	91	Navy	
1944	United States	USS Samuel B. Roberts – On 25 October, in the Battle off Samar, the US destroyer escort was sunk by naval gunfire. The 120 survivors of the crew clung to three life rafts for 50 hours before being rescued but 90 of her crew were killed.	90	Navy	
1944	Japan	Kishinami – On 4 December the Japanese destroyer was torpedoed and sunk by USS Flasher west of Palawan Island. 90 of her crew were killed; 150 survivors were rescued.	90	Navy	
1942	United Kingdom	HMS Blean – While escorting British convoy KMF-4 off the Algerian coast the destroyer was intercepted by U-443 on 11 December 11 nautical miles (20 km) north-west of Oran. U-443 aimed one torpedo at her and then one at the convoy but both hit the destroyer and sank her 60 nautical miles (110 km) off the coast with the loss of 89 men.	89	Navy	
1942	United States	USS Peary – On 19 February, in the bombing of Darwin, Australia, the US destroyer was attacked by Japanese dive bombers and struck by five bombs. She sank stern first in the harbor; 88 men were killed and 13 wounded.	88	Navy	
1945	United States	USS Bush – On 6 April, while on picket duty off Okinawa, the US destroyer was sunk after being struck by kamikaze aircraft. After being struck by three aircraft an unusually heavy swell rocked her and the she began to cave in amidships. Other swells followed and the ship was abandoned by her 227 survivors just before she folded and sank with 87 of her crew killed.	87	Navy	
1945	United States	USS Bullhead – On 6 August the submarine was attacked and sunk by Mitsubishi Ki-51 aircraft carrying depth charges off the Bali coast. Bullhead became the last U.S. Navy ship sunk by the enemy during WWII with the loss of her entire crew of 84.	84	Navy	
1944	Sweden	Hansa – On 24 November, she was torpedoed and sunk between Nynäshamn and Visby by a Soviet submarine. The ship sank within a few minutes, leaving 84 people dead; two survived.	84	Civilian	
1943	United States	SS Louise Lykes – On 9 January the armed merchant ship was sunk with all hands in the North Atlantic by German submarine U-384, while bound for Belfast, Northern Ireland.	83		
1944	United States	USS Mindanao – On 10 November, while anchored in Seeadler Harbor, the repair ship was severely damaged when the ammunition ship USS Mount Hood exploded. Mindanao was 350 yards (320 m) away when Hood exploded, causing extensive damage particularly to Mindanao's superstructure and aft. Of her crew 82 were killed and 98 wounded.	82	Navy	
1942	United States	USS Duncan – On 12 October, in the Battle of Cape Esperance, the US destroyer was sunk by naval gunfire near Savo Island. Her crew tried to beach her on the island and fought to halt the raging fires until power failed forcing the ship's abandonment. Of her crew of 276 aboard 81 were killed.	81	Navy	
1941	United Kingdom	HMS Rosaura – On 18 March the British armed boarding vessel struck a mine off Tobruk, Libya and sank, killing 78 people. (Note – Image is from World War I service as HMHS Dieppe.)	78	Navy	
1944	United Kingdom	HMS Capel – On 26 December the corvette was part of an escort group patrolling 10 nmi (19 km; 12 mi) east-northeast of Cherbourg when U-486 sighted the group and fired three torpedoes of which one hit Capel and another hit HMS Affleck. Of 156 aboard Capel, 76 were killed.	76	Navy	
1944	Japan	Harusame – On 8 June, while on an assignment to evacuate troops from Biak, the Japanese destroyer was attacked and sunk by USAAF B-25 bombers about 30 miles (48 km) northwest of Manokwari, New Guinea. Of the 226 crew aboard, 74 were killed.	74	Navy	
1945	United States	USS Mannert L. Abele – On 12 April the US destroyer was sunk after being hit by two kamikaze aircraft with one being a Yokosuka MXY7 Ohka flying bomb. The first plane to hit her crashed into her starboard side and penetrated her after engine room where it exploded and broke her keel amidships. The second hit, from the flying bomb, struck her starboard waterline abreast of her forward fireroom, exploded, and broke her in two. She sank quickly, killing 73 of her crew.	73	Navy	
1941	United Kingdom	HMS Audacity – On 21 December, while escorting a convoy, the British escort carrier was torpedoed and sunk by German submarine U-751. She sank some 500 mi (430 nmi; 800 km) west of Cape Finisterre in 70 minutes. Of the crew aboard 407 were rescued but 73 were killed.	73	Navy	
1938	Taiwan	Xin Sheng Long – On 23 October, the steamer was attacked by Japanese aircraft and sunk while passing through Yanziwo, Jiayu County. 70-80 passengers were killed, including 16 members of the Xinhua Daily.	70–80	Civilian	
1944	United States	John Burke – On 28 December, while transporting ammunition to Mindoro, Philippines, the Liberty ship was hit by a Japanese kamikaze aircraft and disintegrated in a tremendous explosion with the loss of all hands.	68	Military	
1943	Italy	Giudecca – On 13 October the Italian urban ship, carrying passenger to Venice, was sunk by airplane near Pallestrina. Due to service-like bus only crew list was made. 67 men aboard were buried, but the correct number of killed is more 200.	67	Civilian	
1941	United Kingdom	Empire Endurance – On 20 April, while bound for Cape Town, South Africa and Alexandria, Egypt, the British cargo liner was torpedoed and sunk by the German submarine U-73 south-east of Rockall in the North Atlantic. Of the passengers and crew 66 of the 95 people aboard were killed.	66	Civilian	
1941	United Kingdom	HMS Gladiolus – On 16 October, while recovering survivors from the sinking of Empire Heron the British corvette vanished without trace, along with her crew of 65 and one survivor from Empire Heron.	66	Navy	
1942	Netherlands	HNLMS Van Nes – Sunk 17 February	68	Navy	
1944	United States	USS Mississinewa – On 20 November, north of Mogmog island, the fleet replenishment oiler was sunk by a Japanese Kaiten manned torpedo. Following the explosion she caught fire and sunk with the loss of 63 of her crew.	63	Navy+	
1942	Netherlands	HNLMS Piet Hein – Sunk in the Battle of Badung Strait, 19 February	64	Navy	
1941	United States	USS Nereus – Sometime after 10 December, while steaming from St. Thomas in the U.S. Virgin Islands with a load of bauxite, the US collier or bulk cargo ship disappeared without trace. The exact reason for the disappearance has not been determined and no German submarine claimed her as a target. Her crew of 61 was never found.	61	Navy	
1943	United States	USS Gwin – On 13 July, in the Battle of Kolombangara, the US destroyer was torpedoed and sunk. Of 276 crew, 61 were killed.	61	Navy	
1945	United States	USS Emmons – On 6 April the US destroyer was attacked, heavily damaged and set ablaze, by kamikaze aircraft. With 60 dead and 77 wounded the remaining crew was ordered to abandon ship. Next day, 7 April, the hulk was sunk to prevent her falling into enemy hands.	60	Navy	
1940	Poland	ORP Grom – On 4 May, naval gunfire support missions in the Narvik area, the Polish destroyer was attacked by German aircraft. Her loaded midship torpedo launcher was struck by a bomb from a German plane and the torpedo exploded causing the hull to break in two. The ship sank almost immediately, killing 59 crew.	59	Navy	
1941	United Kingdom	MV Seaforth – On 18 February the cargo vessel was torpedoed and sunk off the coast of Iceland by U-103 with the loss of 59 lives.	59	Civilian	
1942	United States	USS Neches – On 23 January the replenishment oiler was torpedoed and sunk by Japanese submarine I-72 about 120 nautical miles (220 km) west of Pearl Harbor. Of the crew aboard 57 were killed.	57	Navy	
1942	Netherlands	HNLMS Kortenaer – On 27 February, HNLMS Kortenaer along with HNLMS Java and HNLMS De Ruyter and other Allied cruisers and destroyers led a sortie against Japanese warships in an attempt to stop the Japanese invasion fleet in the Battle of the Java Sea. 56–59 of the crews were killed.	56–59	Navy	
1942	United States	Mary Luckenbach – On 14 September, (some sources say 13 September), the US cargo ship was attacked by several German aircraft and was hit by an aerial torpedo. The impact of the torpedo struck the ship's cargo of 1,000 tons of TNT and the explosion was so violent the ship was basically vaporized along with the entire crew.	54–73	Military	
1941	Yugoslavia	Yugoslav monitor Drava – On 12 April, during the Axis invasion of Yugoslavia, a German dive bomber struck the monitor's engine room, killing 54 crew members.	54	Navy	
1942	United Kingdom	HMS Punjabi – On 1 May the destroyer was rammed and sunk in a collision with HMS King George V in fog. Punjabi was sliced in two by the battleship's bow and 49 of the 219 aboard were killed.	49	Navy	
1940	United Kingdom	HMS Sphinx – On 2 February, while minesweeping in the Moray Firth, the British minesweeper was attacked and bombed by German aircraft. The crippled ship was taken under tow by HMS Harrier but eventually capsized 17 hours after being bombed. HMS Boreas rescued 46 of her crew but 49 men were lost. The wreck later drifted ashore two miles north of Lybster and was eventually sold for scrap.	49	Navy	
1944	United States	USS Lansdale – On 20 April, while escorting a convoy to Tunisia, the US destroyer broke in two and sank after being hit by aerial torpedoes from German aircraft. Of the crew aboard 234 survived and 49 were killed.	49	Navy	
1940	United Kingdom	HMS Laurentic – On 3 November, while responding to a distress call off the west Ireland coast, the British auxiliary cruiser was torpedoed and sunk by the German submarine U-99. Of the 416 people aboard 49 were killed.	49	Navy	
1941	United Kingdom	HMS Mashona – On 27 May the British destroyer came under heavy Luftwaffe attack while returning to port. She was bombed and sunk off the coast of Galway, killing 48 men.	48	Navy	
1942	United Kingdom	Empire Dabchick – On 3 December, straggling behind Convoy ON 146, the cargo ship was torpedoed and sunk by U-183 some 200 nautical miles (370 km) south east of Sable Island, Nova Scotia, Canada. All hands, 36 crew and 11 gunners, were killed.	47	Civilian	
1942	United States	USS Strong – On 5 July the US destroyer was torpedoed and sunk by shelling from shore batteries at Bairoko Harbor. She broke in half just before sinking and several of her depth charges exploded causing further injuries and loss of life. Of 329 crew, 46 were killed.	46	Navy	
1942	United Kingdom	Neptuna – On 19 February, in the Bombing of Darwin, Japanese bombs dropped on the cargo ship exploded in the ship's saloon and engine room. 45 men were killed aboard including nine wharf laborerS and 36 crew. Many others were seriously injured and the ship was set afire. As the crew prepared to abandon ship 100 depth charges, that were being unloaded, exploded showering the harbor with debris along with sending flames and smoke 100 metres into the air.	45	Civilian	
1944	United Kingdom	HMS Empire Dace – On 1 December, while traveling in convoy, the British troopship struck a mine off Missolonghi, Greece and sank killing 45 people. She was carrying 22 crew, 12 DEMS gunners and 100 passengers.	45	Navy	
1940	United Kingdom	RMS Empress of Britain – On 26 October, about 70 nautical miles (130 km) northwest of Ireland along the west coast, German aircraft attacked the British troopship three times, strafing her and hitting her with two 250 kilograms (550 lb) bombs. The attack set her afire and without power. On 27 October, while under tow, she was torpedoed by German submarine U-32. She sank the next day, 28 October. Of 623 aboard, 45 were killed.	45	Military	
1942	United Kingdom	HMT Orcades – On 10 October, after leaving Cape Town, the British troopship was torpedoed and sunk by U-172 off the Cape of Good Hope. 45 of her 1,067 crew and passengers were killed.	45	Military	
1940	Netherlands	HNLMS O 22	46	Navy	
1941	United Kingdom	Empire Comet – On 17 February, after falling behind her convoy, the British cargo ship was hit by two torpedoes fired by German submarine U-136. All 44 hands were killed.	44	Civilian	
1941	United Kingdom	HMS Broadwater – on 18 October, while escorting a convoy, the British destroyer was torpedoed by U-101 and sunk. Four officers and 40 crew were killed.	44	Navy	
1941	United Kingdom	HMS Mohawk – On 16 April, while attacking an Italian convoy, the British destroyer was torpedoed and sunk by the Italian destroyer Tarigo off the Kerkennah Islands in eastern Tunisia. Of the crew aboard 43 were killed.	43	Navy	
1941	United Kingdom	HMS Rajputana – On 13 April, four days after parting company with convoy HX 117, the British armed merchant cruiser was torpedoed by U-108 in the Denmark Strait west of Reykjavík, Iceland. She sank over an hour later with the loss of 42 men and 283 of her crew were saved by the destroyer HMS Legion.	42	Navy	
1941	Netherlands	HNLMS Van Meerlant – On 4 June the Dutch minelayer HNLMS struck a mine and sunk off Minster Abbey, Thames Estuary. Of the crew aboard 42 were killed.	42	Navy	
1941	Greece	Hydra – On 22 April, in the German invasion of Greece, the Greek destroyer was attacked by German aircraft and sunk near the island of Lagousa in the Saronic Gulf. Of those aboard 42 were killed.	42	Navy	
1942	United Kingdom	HMS Penylan – On 3 December, while escorting a convoy, the destroyer was torpedoed and sunk 5 nautical miles (9.3 km) south of Start Point, Devon by the German E-boat S-115. Of those aboard, five officers and 112 ratings were rescued and 41 killed. She was the shortest-lived of her class, spending only 30 days in service.	41	Navy	
1941	Netherlands	HNLMS O 16 – Sunk by mine on 15 December	41	Navy	
1939	Poland	ORP Mazur – On the first day of World War II, 1 September, the Polish torpedo boat was sunk by a German air attack at the port of Oksywie. The ship suffered one close hit along with a hit amidships and sank while still firing at the German aircraft. 40 of her 80 crew were killed.	40	Navy	
1942	United Kingdom	HMS Marigold – On 9 December, while escorting a convoy off Algiers, the British corvette was sunk by a German aircraft-launched torpedo. Of her 85 crew, 40 were killed.	40	Navy	
1941	Netherlands	HNLMS K XVI – Sunk on 25 December	36	Navy	
1941	Netherlands	HNLMS K XVII – Struck by a mine on 21 December	36	Navy	
1940	Netherlands	HNLMS O 13 – lost in June	34	Navy	
1941	Sweden	Hårsfjärden disaster – Three destroyers of the Swedish Navy were sunk by explosions in Hårsfjärden fjord on 17 September. The torpedoes of two ships exploded, then flames spread to a third destroyer. The cause was never determined.	33	Navy	
1942	(United Kingdom) Australia	Kuttabul – Australian depot ship sunk by Japanese submarine in Sydney Harbour on 1 June	21	Navy	
1939	Poland	Piłsudski – On 26 November the ship was sunk in the North Sea. True cause remains unknown. It is believed she struck a mine or two or was torpedoed twice or one time.	c. 10	Merchant	

== See also ==
- List of maritime disasters
- List of maritime disasters in the 18th century
- List of maritime disasters in the 19th century
- List of maritime disasters in the 20th century
- List of maritime disasters in World War I
- List of maritime disasters in the 21st century
- Shipwreck
- Lists of shipwrecks
- List of disasters
- List of accidents and disasters by death toll
- List by death toll of ships sunk by submarines
- List of RORO vessel accidents
