= Italian ship Uragano =

Uragano has been borne by at least two ships of the Italian Navy:

- Italian patrol boat Uragano, previously the mercantile Dimon purchased by Italy in 1916 and renamed. She was discarded in 1919.
- Italian torpedo boat Uragano, a Ciclone-class torpedo boat launched in 1942 and sunk in 1943 by a naval mine.
