= SS Lima Maru =

Lima Maru
History

Japan
- Name: Lima Maru
- Builder: Mitsubishi Zosen Kaisha (Nagasaki)
- Laid down: 24 October 1919
- Launched: 25 March 1920
- Acquired: 25 April 1920
- In service: 1920
- Out of service: 1944
- Fate: Sunk, 8 February 1944

General characteristics
- Type: Troop transport
- Tonnage: 6,989 tons
- Propulsion: 2 × triple-expansion engines, 5,304 hp (3,955 kW)
- Speed: 14.6 knots (27.0 km/h; 16.8 mph)
- Range: 18,000 nmi (33,000 km; 21,000 mi) at 11 knots (20 km/h; 13 mph)

Lima Maru was a 6,989-ton Japanese troop transport during World War II, which sank on 8 February 1944 with great loss of life.

Lima Maru was built in 1920 by the Mitsubishi Zosen Kaisha (Mitsubishi Shipyard & Machinery Works) in Nagasaki for the Nippon Yusen shipping company. After she was completed in 1920 (Taisho 9), she played an active role as the main cargo ship of Nippon Yusen for European routes.

When the Second Sino-Japanese War began, Lima Maru was used by the Imperial Japanese Army from 1 September 1937 to 30 March 1938 and from 24 June 1938, to 1939 (Showa 14). In 1941 (Showa 16), amid tensions between Japan and the United States, she went to Los Angeles in the United States to collect aviation gasoline and transported it to the port of Kaohsiung, which was then a Japanese territory.

When Japan began preparations for war with the United States, the ship, which was already over 20 years old and classified as a dilapidated ship, was requisitioned by the Japanese Army on 13 September 1941. After the outbreak of the Pacific War, on 22 December of the same year, Lima Maru belonged to the 2nd Fleet, 8th Squadron of a total of 84 convoys, including the same T-type Tajima Maru and Tsushima Maru, participated in the landings at Lingayen Gulf, Luzon, during the Battle of the Philippines. In 1942, she took in the army units that had finished the Battle of Hong Kong and landed them at Palembang, Sumatra. She participated in the Battle of Burma, and joined the advance to Rangoon, and on the way back, towed the cargo ship Asoyama Maru, which had been wrecked in the Battle of Malaya, from Pattani to Hong Kong. On 12–29 November of the same year, she transferred from Moji to Rabaul. 1,234 army officers and 118 horses of the engineering corps were safely transported. In 1943, the vessel was based at Manila, and acted mainly in the Philippines. On 16 March and 6 April of the same year, she encountered an enemy submarine, but she escaped by firing at it with self-defense artillery, and was commended by the army.

On 8 February 1944, as part of convoy MOTA-02, she was transporting around 2,900 men of the Japanese 19th Brigade from Moji to Takao. Lima Maru was torpedoed and sunk by the US submarine USS Snook some 30 miles (48 km) southeast of the Gotō Islands at position 31°05′N 127°37′E. The Lima Maru exploded and sank very fast. Fewer than 150 soldiers survived.

In August 2018, Tamaki Ura, a special professor at Kyushu Institute of Technology, conducted a seafloor survey in the area where the ship was presumed to have sunk, but no hull was found. The bodies of some of the victims washed ashore on Mageshima Island (Nishinoomote City, Kagoshima Prefecture), more than 300 kilometres (190 mi) to the east, and were temporarily buried by the islanders. A bone survey by the Ministry of Health, Labor and Welfare was scheduled for late October to early November 2018.

== See also ==
- List by death toll of ships sunk by submarines
- List of maritime disasters in World War II
