= SS Lenin =

Sunk Soviet passenger ship

Coordinates: 44.3333°N 33.7417°E

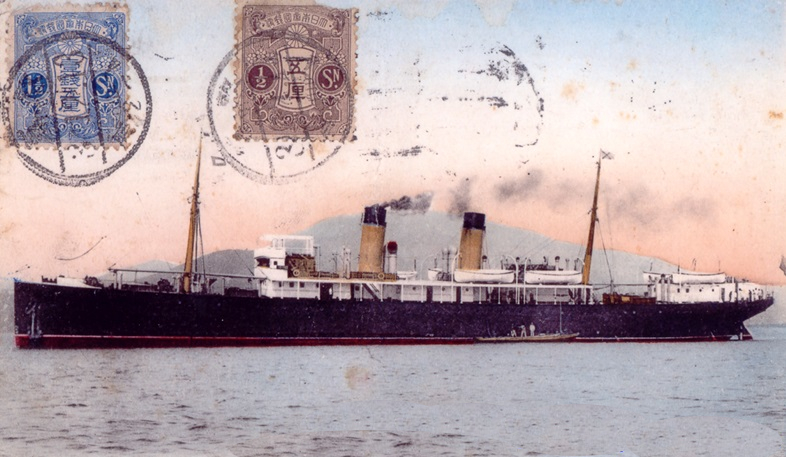
- Steamboat "Simbirsk" before renaming to "Lenin"

History

Soviet Union
- Name: Lenin
- Operator: Black Sea State Shipping Co
- Builder: Schichau-Werke, Danzig
- Yard number: 832
- Completed: 1909
- In service: 1909 – 1941
- Renamed: SS Simbirsk (until 1923)
- Fate: Lost 27 July 1941

General characteristics
- Tonnage: 2,713 gross register tons (GRT); 1,356 net register tons (NRT)
- Length: 94.8 m (311 ft 0 in)
- Beam: 12.6 m (41 ft 4 in)
- Height: 5.7 m (18 ft 8 in)
- Propulsion: 1 × screw; 1 × 3-cylinder triple-expansion steam engine
- Speed: 17 knots (31 km/h; 20 mph)

The SS Lenin was a Soviet passenger ship, owned by Black Sea State Shipping Co, which sank in the Black Sea on 27 July 1941 with great loss of life.

== History ==
Before the War, SS Lenin served as a passenger ship between the several Russian Black Sea Ports.

On 24 July 1941, she departed from Mariupol via Sevastopol to Yalta. Only 482 passengers had tickets, but many more passengers were allowed onto the ship. Also some 1200 soldiers of the Red Army reserves boarded the ship. She left Sevastopol for Yalta on 27 July, together with passenger ships Voroshilov, Gruzia and Navy Boat SKA-026. At 23:33 an explosion of unknown nature struck to ship and she sank within 10 minutes.

Only 43 crew and about 600 passengers were rescued. At least 49 crew and 900 passengers were lost, but the death toll could have been much larger. Estimates vary between 2,500 and 4,600 casualties. The reason of the sinking was probably a navigation mistake by Navy pilot lieutenant I.I.Svistun, who changed the route and sent the ship into a Soviet minefield. He was arrested and shot on 24 August 1941. Reports of a torpedo attack by a Romanian submarine were not confirmed by the Romanian Navy.

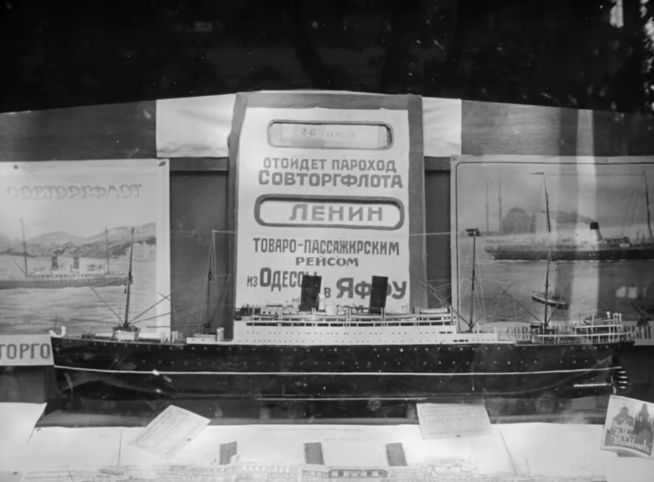
Still from the film Man with a Movie Camera showing the SS Lenin

== Bibliography ==
- Wilson, Edward A. (1978). Soviet Passenger Ships, 1917–1977. Kendal, UK: World Ship Society. ISBN 0-905617-04-5.
