= Italian torpedo boat Uragano =

Italian Navy ship

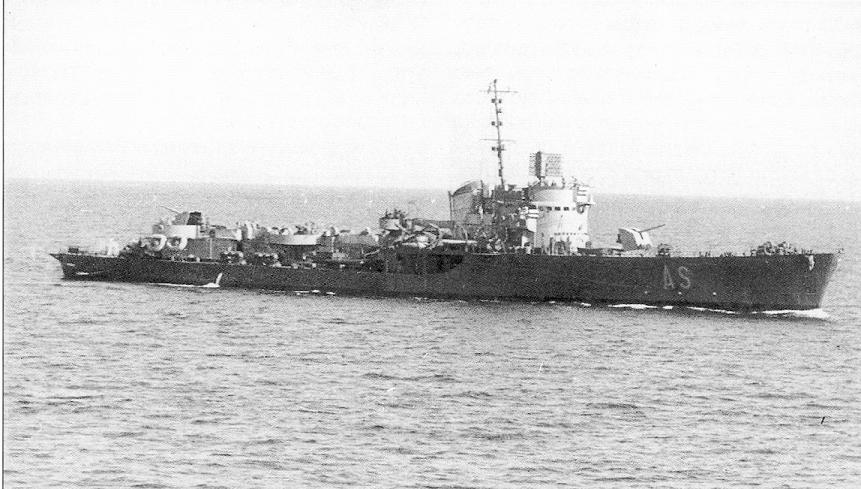
- Aliseo, Uragano's sister ship

History

Italy
- Name: Uragano
- Builder: Cantieri Riuniti dell'Adriatico, Trieste
- Laid down: 17 June 1941
- Launched: 3 May 1942
- Completed: 26 September 1942
- Fate: Sunk 3 February 1943

General characteristics
- Type: Torpedo boat
- Displacement: 910 long tons (920 t) standard; 1,625 long tons (1,651 t) full load
- Length: 82.5 m (270 ft 8 in)
- Beam: 9.9 m (32 ft 6 in)
- Draught: 3.77 m (12 ft 4 in)
- Propulsion: 2 shaft steam turbines; 2 Yarrow type boilers; 16,000 hp (11,900 kW)
- Speed: 26 knots (48 km/h; 30 mph)
- Complement: 154
- Sensors & processing systems: Sonar and hydrophones
- Armament: 2 × 100 mm (4 in) / 47 caliber guns; 8 × 20 mm (0.79 in) anti-aircraft guns; 4 × 450 mm (18 in) torpedo tubes; 4 × depth charge throwers

Uragano was a Ciclone-class torpedo boat that served with the Italian Navy during the Second World War. The vessel entered service in 1942 and was sunk by a naval mine on 3 February 1943.

== Service history ==
Uragano's keel was laid down on 17 June 1941 by Cantieri Riuniti dell'Adriatico at Trieste. The ship was launched on 3 May 1942. Construction was completed on 26 September 1942. The ship was sunk by a naval mine on 3 February 1943.

== Sources ==
- Chesneau, Roger, ed. (1980). Conway's All the World's Fighting Ships 1922–1946. Greenwich, UK: Conway Maritime Press. ISBN 0-85177-146-7.
- Fraccaroli, Aldo (1974) [1968]. Italian Warships of World War II. London: Ian Allan. ISBN 0-7110-0002-6.
- Whitley, M. J. (1988). Destroyers of World War 2. London: Cassell Publishing. ISBN 1-85409-521-8.
