= Odoardo Somigli =

Italian admiral

- Born: 12 August 1892; La Spezia, Kingdom of Italy
- Died: 24 February 1967 (aged 74); Rome, Italy
- Military career
- Allegiance: Kingdom of Italy
- Branch: Regia Marina
- Rank: Squadron Admiral
- Commands: H 5 (submarine); X 3 (submarine Quintino Sella (destroyer) "Folgore" Destroyer Squadron; 7th Naval Division; Taranto Naval Department; Traffic Protection Naval Forces Command
- Conflicts: World War I; World War II
- Awards: War Merit Cross; Military Order of Savoy; Order of the Crown of Italy; Order of Saints Maurice and Lazarus; Colonial Order of the Star of Italy; Order of Merit of the Italian Republic

Odoardo Somigli (La Spezia, 12 August 1892 – Rome, 24 February 1967) was an Italian admiral during the interwar period and World War II. He was Deputy Chief of Staff of the Royal Italian Navy (and de facto head of Supermarina) from August 1939 to December 1940.

== Biography ==
He was born in La Spezia on 12 August 1892 and entered the Naval Academy of Livorno in 1909, graduating in 1912 with the rank of ensign. During the First World War he initially served on the armored cruiser Pisa with the rank of sub-lieutenant; in 1916 he was promoted to lieutenant and assigned on the submarine H 5 as executive officer, subsequently assuming its command and participating, after the Armistice of Villa Giusti, in the occupation of Umago. After the war, between 1922 and 1924 he commanded the submarine X 3; in 1924 he was promoted to corvette captain and in 1928-1929 he commanded the destroyer Quintino Sella, after which he was promoted to frigate captain in 1930.

From 1929 to 1932 he served at the Naval Academy of Livorno, while in October 1932 he was executive officer of the royal yacht Savoia during Victor Emmanuel III's voyage to Eritrea. He subsequently commanded the "Folgore" Destroyer Squadron and in 1935 he was promoted to captain; in the following years he quickly climbed the hierarchies of the Regia Marina, becoming Counter Admiral as early as 1936 (thanks to an ad personam law that allowed him to skip the planned period of naval command, and which was abrogated immediately afterwards), divisional admiral in 1938 and squadron admiral in 1939, holding the position of chief of staff of the Minister of the Navy from 1935 to 1938 and then commanding the 7th Naval Division in 1938-1939 during a cruise in South America. In August 1939 he was appointed Deputy Chief of Staff of the Navy, a position he held until December 1940, when he was replaced by Inigo Campioni. In this position, Somigli effectively exercised command of Supermarina in the first six months of the war, marked by the battles of Punta Stilo and of Cape Spartivento.

From the end of 1940 to April 1943 he commanded the Naval Department of Taranto, and from April to September 1943 he held the command of the naval forces responsible for the protection of convoys (Comando Forze Navali Protezione Traffico), with headquarters in Rome.

On 7 September 1943 he participated in a meeting held at the headquarters of the Royal Italian Navy, in the presence of the Chief of Staff Raffaele de Courten, in which he was informed that preparations were to be made for the possibility of hostilities with the German forces in the near future. Together with him, Deputy Chief of Staff Luigi Sansonetti, adjunct Deputy Chief of Staff Carlo Emanuele Giartosio, Secretary-General of Navy Emilio Ferreri, Chief of the Operations Office Massimo Girosi, and Admirals Carlo Bergamini, Alberto Da Zara, Bruto Brivonesi, Antonio Legnani, Giotto Maraghini, Ferdinando Casardi and Emilio Brenta also attended the meeting. After the proclamation of the armistice, Somigli remained in German-controlled territory, without collaborating with them or joining the Italian Social Republic; he returned to territory under the control of the pro-Allied royalist government after the liberation of Rome, and was subjected to a purge for his past proximity to the Fascist regime, which had helped him in his fast career track, being forcibly discharged from active service in January 1945. This sentence was however revoked in December 1947 after Somigli appealed the decision.

From 1949 to 1956 he was president of the Center for High Military Studies. He died in Rome in 1967.
