= Battle of the Mediterranean =

World War II naval campaign

Battle of Mediterranean
- Part of the Mediterranean and Middle East theatre of World War II
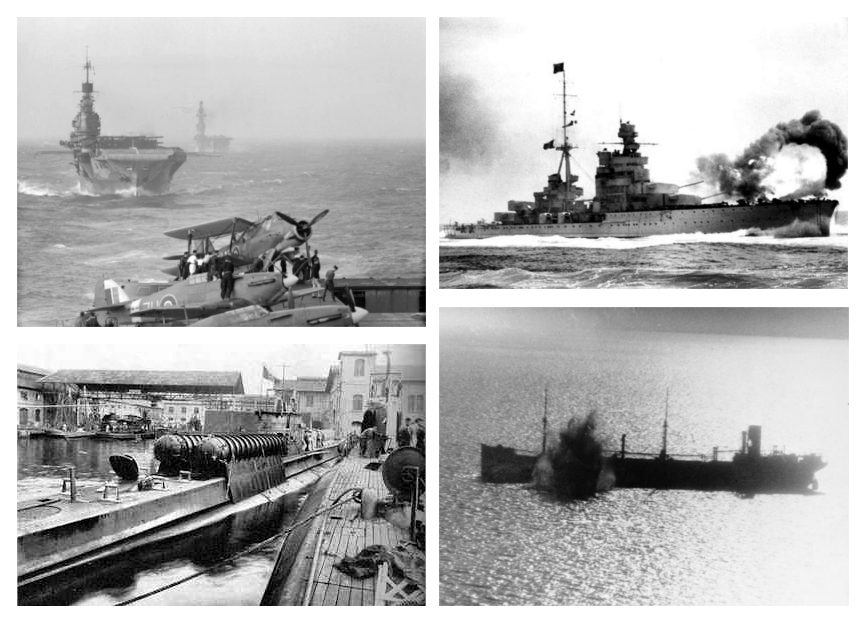
- From top left to clockwise: British aircraft carrier during the Operation Pedestal, the Italian cruiser Zara opens fire during the Battle of Cape Spartivento, an Italian merchant ship under enemy air attack, the Italian submarine Gondar with the SLC cylinders on the deck.
Date	10 June 1940 – 2 May 1945 (4 years, 10 months, 3 weeks and 1 day)
Location	Mediterranean Sea
Result	Allied victory

Belligerents
United Kingdom; United States (from 1942) Other participants: (French Third Republic) (Free France) France; Canada; Poland; Australia; New Zealand; Yugoslavia (from 1941); Greece; Netherlands; Brazil (from 1942); Italy (from 1943)	Italy (until 1943); Germany; Italian Social Republic (from 1943) Vichy France (Note: 18 July 1940 & 24–25 September (Mers-el-Kébir & Gibraltar), 8 June-14 July 1941 (Syria–Lebanon Campaign), and 8–11 November 1942 (Operation Torch and Case Anton). Vichy officially pursued a policy of armed neutrality and conducted military actions against armed incursions from both Axis and Allied belligerents. The cease fire and pledging of allegiance of the Vichy troops in French North Africa to the Allies during Torch convinced the Axis that Vichy could not be trusted to continue this policy, so they invaded and occupied the French rump state.)

Commanders and leaders
(United Kingdom) Andrew Cunningham (United Kingdom) Henry Harwood (United Kingdom) James Somerville (United Kingdom) William Agnew (United Kingdom) Philip Vian (United Kingdom) Alban Curteis (United Kingdom) Edward Neville Syfret (United States) Henry Hewitt	(Kingdom of Italy) Odoardo Somigli (Kingdom of Italy) Inigo Campioni (Fascist Italy) Luigi Sansonetti (Kingdom of Italy) Angelo Iachino (Kingdom of Italy) Carlo Bergamini (Kingdom of Italy) Alberto da Zara (Kingdom of Italy) Mario Falangola (Kingdom of Italy) Antonio Legnani (Kingdom of Italy) (Italian Social Republic) Junio Valerio Borghese (Nazi Germany) Albert Kesselring (Nazi Germany) Fritz Frauenheim

Casualties and losses
Up to September 1943: Total: 76 warships of 315,500 tons 48 submarines	Up to September 1943: (Kingdom of Italy) Italy: 83 warships totalling 195,100 tons 84 submarines 2,018,616 tons of merchant shipping c. 21,000 Royal Italian Navy personnel and c. 6,500 Italian Merchant Navy personnel killed at sea (Nazi Germany) Germany: 17 warships 68 submarines (Vichy France) Vichy France; 11 warships of ~72,000 tons 7 submarines

The Battle of the Mediterranean was the naval campaign fought in the Mediterranean Sea during World War II. It began on 10 June 1940, when Italy declared war on the United Kingdom and France and bombed Malta the following day, and ended on 2 May 1945 with the formal surrender of German and Italian Fascist forces in Italy. It was part of the broader Mediterranean and Middle East Theater of the war, which include operations across the Mediterranean basin and the Horn of Africa.

The campaign was fought primarily between the Italian Royal Navy (Regia Marina), supported by the naval and air forces of its Axis partners, Nazi Germany and Vichy France, and the British Royal Navy, supported by other Allied naval forces, such as those of Australia, the Netherlands, Poland, and Greece. In November 1942, American naval and air units joined the Allies, while the Vichy French scuttled the bulk of their fleet to prevent the Germans seizing it. As part of the Armistice of Cassibile in September 1943, most of the Italian Navy became the Italian Co-belligerent Navy and fought alongside the Allies.

Driven by aspirations to establish a new Roman Empire, Italy's large and modern navy challenged Britain's established dominance of the Mediterranean Sea. Control of the Mediterranean was strategically vital, as it determined the fate of forces in the ongoing North African campaign and whether Britain could maintain its imperial holdings in the East. Each side had three overall objectives: Attack enemy supply lines; keep open the supply lines to their own armies in North Africa; and destroy the ability of the opposing navy to wage war at sea. Outside the Pacific theatre, the Mediterranean saw the largest conventional naval warfare actions during the conflict. In particular, Allied forces struggled to supply and retain the key naval and air base of Malta.

By the time of the armistice, Italian ships, submarines and aircraft had sunk Allied surface warships totalling 145,800 tons, while German forces had sunk 169,700 tons, for a total of 315,500 tons; the Allies lost 76 warships and 46 submarines. The Allies sank 83 Italian warships totalling 195,100 tons—161,200 by the British Empire and 33,900 by the United States—and 83 submarines. German losses in the Mediterranean during the campaign were 17 warships and 68 submarines.

== Main combatants ==
=== British Mediterranean Fleet ===
The Mediterranean was a traditional focus of British maritime power. Outnumbered by the forces of the Regia Marina, the British plan was to hold the three key strategic points of Gibraltar, Malta, and the Suez Canal. By holding these points, the Mediterranean Fleet held open vital supply routes. Malta was the lynch-pin of the whole system. It provided a needed stop for Allied convoys and a base from which to attack the Axis supply routes.

==== Mediterranean strategy ====
The Mediterranean strategy of Winston Churchill and Alan Brooke was the British policy of opening the Mediterranean to British and allied ships and knocking Italy out of the war before invading Europe, as it would save a million tons of shipping per year in having to send ships to Egypt and the Middle East via the route around Africa. See also Percentages agreement. Churchill also wanted to invade the Balkans.

=== Italian Royal Fleet ===
Italian dictator Benito Mussolini saw the control of the Mediterranean as essential for expanding his "New Roman Empire" into Nice, Corsica, Tunis and the Balkans. Italian naval building accelerated during his tenure and Mussolini described the Mediterranean Sea as Mare Nostrum (our sea).

The warships of the Regia Marina (Italian Royal Navy) had a reputation for being well-designed. Italian small attack craft lived up to expectations and were responsible for many successful actions in the Mediterranean. Some Italian cruiser classes were deficient in armour and all Italian warships lacked radar although this was partly offset by Italian warships being equipped with good rangefinder and fire-control systems for daylight combat. Only by the spring of 1943, barely five months before the armistice, were twelve Italian warships equipped with Italian-designed EC-3 ter Gufo radar devices. Allied commanders at sea had discretion to act on their initiative, the actions of Italian commanders were severely constrained by Italian Naval Headquarters (Supermarina).

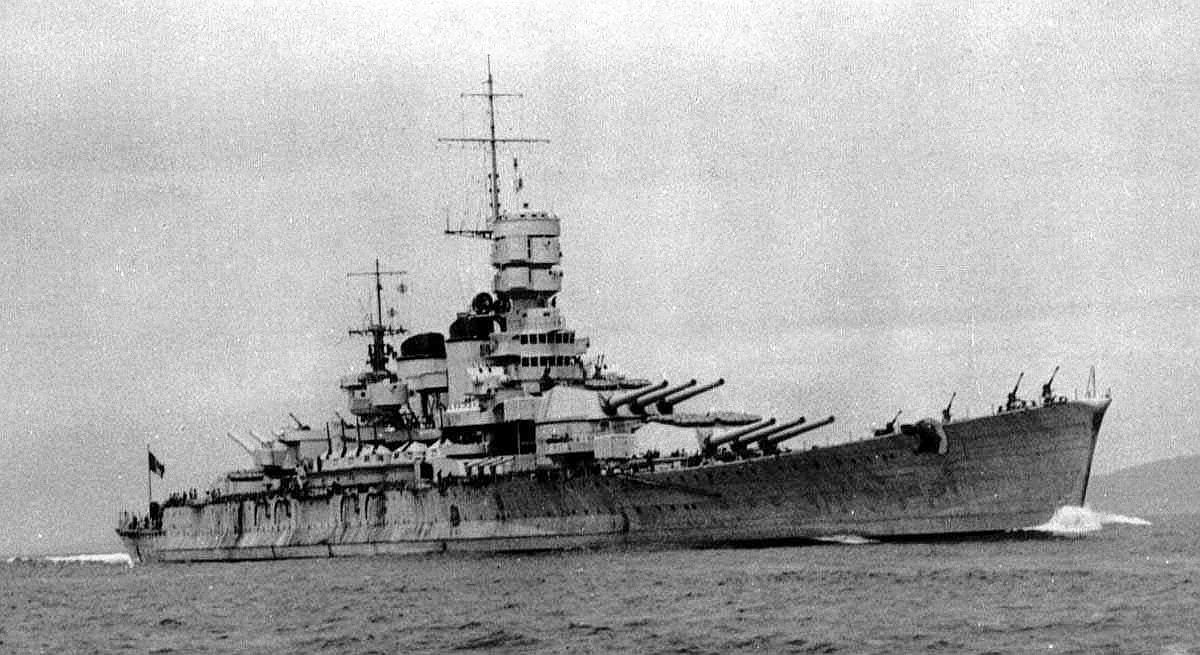
Italian battleship Roma (1940) starboard bow view

The Regia Marina also lacked a proper fleet air arm. The aircraft carrier Aquila was never completed and most air support during the Battle of the Mediterranean was supplied by the land-based Regia Aeronautica (Royal Air Force). Another handicap for the Italians was the shortage of fuel. As early as March 1941, the scarcity of fuel oil was critical. Coal, gasoline and lubricants were also locally hard to find. During the Italian war effort, 75% of all the fuel oil available was used by destroyers and torpedo boats carrying out escort missions.

The most serious problem for the Axis forces in North Africa was the limited capacity of the Libyan ports. Tripoli was the largest port in Libya and it could accommodate a maximum of five large cargo vessels or four troop transports. Tripoli had an unloading capacity of 45,000 short tons (41,000 t) per month. Tobruk added only another 18,000 short tons (16,000 t). Bardia and other smaller ports added a little more. The Axis forces in North Africa exceeded the capacity of the ports to supply them. It has been calculated that the average Axis division required 10,000 short tons (9,100 t) of supplies per month; the Italians had failed to increase the capacity of Tripoli and the other ports before the war.

=== French Fleet ===
In January 1937, France began a programme of modernisation and expansion. This soon elevated the French Fleet to the fourth-largest in the world.

By agreement with the British Admiralty, the strongest concentration of French vessels was in the Mediterranean. Here, the Italian Fleet posed a threat to the vitally important French sea routes from Metropolitan France to North Africa and to the British sea routes between Gibraltar and the Suez Canal.

=== Vichy French Fleet ===
In 1940, after France fell to the Germans, the Marine Nationale in the Mediterranean became the navy of the Vichy French government. As the Vichy French Navy, this force was considered a potentially grave threat to the Royal Navy. As such, it was imperative to the British that this threat be neutralised.

As the opening phase of Operation Catapult, the French squadron at Alexandria in Egypt was dealt with via negotiations. This proved possible primarily because the two commanders—Admirals René-Emile Godfroy and Andrew Cunningham—were on good personal terms. In contrast, a British ultimatum to place the bulk of the remainder of the French fleet out of German reach was refused. The fleet was located at Mers-el-Kebir in Algeria, so on 3 July 1940 it was largely destroyed by bombardment by the British "Force H" from Gibraltar (Admiral James Somerville). The Vichy French government broke off all ties with the British as a result of this attack and the Vichy French Air Force (Armée de l'Air de l'armistice) even raided British installations at Gibraltar.

At least two Allied freighters were captured by French forces in Tunisia and later handed over to the Italian navy.

In June and July 1941, a small Vichy French naval force was involved during Operation Exporter. This was an Allied action launched against Vichy French forces based in Lebanon and Syria. French naval vessels had to be driven off before the Litani River could be crossed.

In 1942, as part of the occupation of Vichy France during "Case Anton", the Germans intended to capture the French fleet at Toulon. This was thwarted by determined action by French commanders; the bulk of the fleet was scuttled at anchor.

=== German Navy ===
The Mediterranean U-boat Campaign lasted approximately from 21 September 1941 to May 1944. Germany's Kriegsmarine aimed at isolating Gibraltar, Malta, and the Suez Canal so as to break Britain's trade route to the far east. More than 60 U-boats were sent to disrupt shipping in the sea, although many were attacked in the Strait of Gibraltar, which was controlled by Britain (nine boats were sunk while attempting the passage and ten more were damaged). The Luftwaffe also played a key part in the Battle of the Mediterranean, especially during the summer of 1941. German war strategy, however, viewed the Mediterranean as a secondary theatre of operations.

== History ==
=== First actions ===
On 10 June 1940, Italy declared war on Britain and France. The following day, Italian bombers attacked Malta on what was to be the first of many raids. France's Marine Nationale shelled a number of targets on the northwestern coast of Italy, in particular the port of Genoa. When France surrendered on 24 June, the Axis leaders allowed the new Vichy French government to retain its navy.

The first clash between the rival fleets in the Battle of Calabria, took place on 9 July, four weeks after the start of hostilities. This was inconclusive, and concurrent with a series of small surface actions during the summer, among them being the Battle of the Espero convoy and the Battle of Cape Spada.

=== Battle of Taranto ===
To reduce the threat posed by the Italian fleet, which was based in the port of Taranto, to convoys sailing to Malta, Admiral Cunningham organised an attack code-named Operation Judgement. Fairey Swordfish torpedo bombers from HMS Illustrious attacked the Italian fleet on 11 November 1940 while it was still at anchor. This was the first time that an attack such as this had been attempted and it was studied by Japanese naval officers in preparation for the later attack on Pearl Harbor. British Fleet Air Arm aircraft badly damaged two Italian battleships and a third was forced to run aground to prevent her sinking, putting half of the Regia Marina's major ships out of action for several months. This attack also forced the Italian fleet to move to Italian ports further north so as to be out of range of carrier-based aircraft. This reduced the threat of Italian sallies attacking Malta-bound convoys.

Cunningham's estimate that Italians would be unwilling to risk their remaining heavy units was quickly proven wrong. Only five days after Taranto, Inigo Campioni sortied with two battleships, six cruisers and 14 destroyers to disrupt a British aircraft delivery operation to Malta.

Furthermore, as early as 27 November, the Italian fleet was able to confront the Mediterranean fleet again in the indecisive Battle of Cape Spartivento. Two of the three damaged battleships were repaired by mid-1941 and control of the Mediterranean continued to swing back and forth until the Italian armistice in 1943. Measured against its primary task of disrupting Axis convoys to Africa, the Taranto attack had little effect. In fact, Italian shipping to Libya increased between the months of October 1940 – January 1941 to an average of 49,435 tons per month, up from the 37,204-ton average of the previous four months. Moreover, rather than change the balance of power in the central Mediterranean, British naval authorities had "failed to deliver the true knockout blow that would have changed the context within which the rest of the war in the Mediterranean was fought."

=== Battle of Cape Matapan ===
The Battle of Cape Matapan was fought off the coast of the Peloponnese in southern Greece from 27 to 29 March 1941 in which Royal Navy and Royal Australian Navy forces—under the command of the British Admiral Andrew Cunningham—intercepted those of the Italian Regia Marina under Admiral Angelo Iachino. The Allies sank the heavy cruisers Fiume, Zara and Pola and the destroyers Vittorio Alfieri and Giosue Carducci, and damaged the battleship Vittorio Veneto. The British lost one torpedo plane and suffered light splinter damage to some cruisers from Vittorio Veneto's salvoes. The factors in the Allied victory were the effectiveness of aircraft carriers, the use of Ultra intercepts and the lack of radar on the Italian ships.

=== Fall of Crete ===
The effort to prevent German troops from reaching Crete by sea, and subsequently the partial evacuation of Allied land forces after their defeat by German paratroops in the Battle of Crete during May 1941, cost the Allied navies a number of ships. Attacks by German planes, mainly Junkers Ju 87s and Ju 88s, sank eight British warships: two light cruisers (HMS Gloucester and Fiji) and six destroyers (HMS Kelly, HMS Greyhound, HMS Kashmir, HMS Hereward, HMS Imperial and HMS Juno). Seven other ships were damaged, including the battleships HMS Warspite and Valiant and the light cruiser Orion. Nearly 2,000 British sailors died.

It was a significant victory for the Luftwaffe, as it proved that the Royal Navy could not operate in waters where the German Air Force had air supremacy without suffering severe losses. In the end, however, this had little strategic meaning, since the attention of the German Army was directed toward Russia (in Operation Barbarossa) a few weeks later, and the Mediterranean was to play only a secondary role in German war planning over the following years. The action did, however, extend the Axis reach into the eastern Mediterranean, and prolong the threat to Allied convoys.

Two attempts were carried out to transport German troops by sea in caïques, but both of them were disrupted by Royal Navy intervention. The tiny Italian naval escorts, however, managed to save most of the vessels involved. Eventually, the Italians landed a force of their own near Sitia on 28 May, when the Allied withdrawal was already ongoing.

During the evacuation, Cunningham was determined that the "Navy must not let the Army down." When army generals stated their fears that he would lose too many ships, Cunningham said that "It takes three years to build a ship, it takes three centuries to build a tradition." Despite advance warning through Ultra intercepts, the Battle of Crete resulted in a decisive defeat for the Allies. The invasion took a fearful toll of the German paratroops, who were dropped without their major weapons, which were delivered separately in containers. So heavy were the losses that General Kurt Student, who commanded the German invasion, would later say, referring to the German decision not to use parachutists in any future invasion attempts:

"Crete was the grave of the German parachutists."

=== The balance shifts ===
After the battle of Crete in the summer of 1941, the Royal Navy regained its ascendancy in the central Mediterranean in a series of successful convoy attacks, (including the Duisburg convoy and Cap Bon), until the Raid on Alexandria in December swung the balance of power towards the Axis.

The Regia Marina's most successful attack on the British Fleet was when divers attached limpet mines on the hulls of British battleships during the Raid on Alexandria on 19 December 1941. The battleships HMS Queen Elizabeth and HMS Valiant were sunk at their berths, but they were both raised and returned to active service by mid 1943.

=== Relief of Malta ===
Malta's position between Sicily and North Africa was perfect to interdict Axis supply convoys destined for North Africa. It could thus influence the campaign in North Africa and support Allied actions against Italy. The Axis recognised this and made great efforts to neutralise the island as a British base, either by air attacks or by starving it of its own supplies.

After a series of hard-fought convoy battles, all of them Axis victories (such as the Second Battle of Sirte in March and operations Harpoon and Vigorous in June), it looked as if the island would be starved into submission by the use of Axis aircraft and warships based in Sicily, Sardinia, Crete and North Africa. A number of Allied convoys were decimated. The turning point in the siege came in August 1942, when the British sent a very heavily defended convoy under the codename Operation Pedestal. Malta's air defence was repeatedly reinforced by Hawker Hurricane and Supermarine Spitfire fighters flown to the island from HMS Furious and other Allied aircraft carriers. The situation eased as Axis forces were forced away from their North African bases and eventually Malta could be resupplied and become an offensive base once again.

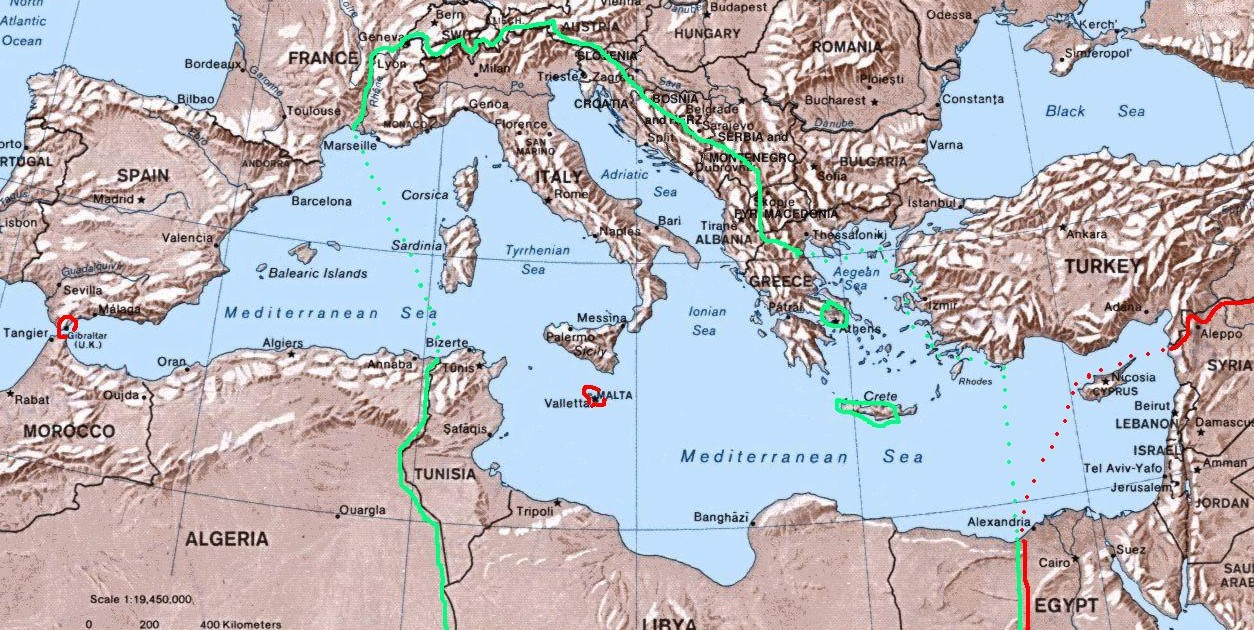
Greatest extent of Italian control of the Mediterranean littoral and seas (within green lines and dots) in the summer/autumn of 1942. Allied-controlled areas are in red.

The British re-established a substantial air garrison and offensive naval base on the island. With the aid of Ultra, Malta's garrison was able to disrupt Axis supplies to North Africa immediately before the Second Battle of El Alamein. For the fortitude and courage of the Maltese people during the siege, the island was awarded the George Cross. The Royal Navy and the RAF sank 3,082 Axis merchantmen in the Mediterranean, amounting to over 4 million tons. In September 1943, with the Italian collapse and the surrender of the Italian fleet, naval actions in the Mediterranean became restricted to operations against U-boats and by small craft in the Adriatic and Aegean seas.

=== Italian armistice ===
On 25 July 1943, the Grand Council of Fascism ousted Mussolini. A new Italian government, led by King Victor Emmanuel III and Marshal Pietro Badoglio, immediately began secret negotiations with the Allies to end the fighting. On 3 September, a secret armistice was signed with the Allies at Fairfield Camp in Sicily. The armistice was announced on 8 September.

After the armistice, the Italian Navy was split in two. In southern Italy, the "Co-Belligerent Navy of the South" (Marina Cobelligerante del Sud) fought for the King and Badoglio. In the north, a much smaller portion of the Regia Marina joined the Republican National Navy (Marina Nazionale Repubblicana) of Mussolini's new Italian Social Republic (Repubblica Sociale Italiana, or RSI) and fought on for the Germans.

== Notable naval actions of the campaign ==
=== 1940 ===
- 12 June, first confirmed engagement at sea. The British light cruiser HMS Calypso was sunk in the Eastern Mediterranean by the Italian submarine Alpino Bagnolini; 39 sailors perished, the survivors were taken to Alexandria.
- 28 June, Battle of the Espero Convoy. An Italian convoy was attacked, the Italian destroyer Espero (1927) was sunk, two other destroyers outran the British fleet and reached Benghazi. Conversely, two British convoys from Malta were delayed as a result of this action.
- 9 July, the Battle of Calabria. An encounter between fleet forces escorting large convoys. Inconclusive results.
- 19 July, the Battle of Cape Spada. A cruiser action. The Italian cruiser Bartolomeo Colleoni was sunk by HMAS Sydney.
- 12 October, the Battle of Cape Passero. One destroyer and two Italian torpedo boats were sunk, the cruiser HMS Ajax was seriously damaged.
- 11 November, the Battle of Taranto. An aerial attack on the Italian fleet in harbour, three battleships were sunk in shallow waters, one of them was disabled for the rest of the war.
- 17 November, Operation White. Aircraft delivery to Malta was disrupted by the Italian Fleet.
- 27 November, the Battle of Cape Spartivento. Inconclusive fleet action.

=== 1941 ===
- 6–11 January, Operation Excess. A British convoy reached Malta successfully. The Italian torpedo boat Vega was sunk, the British destroyer HMS Gallant was permanently disabled after hitting a mine.
- 25-28 February, Operation Abstention. A British amphibious landing on the island of Kastellorizo was thwarted by the Italian Navy.
- 26 March, Action of Suda Bay, Crete. The British cruiser HMS York was sunk by explosive motor boats launched from Italian destroyers.
- 27–29 March, Battle of Cape Matapan. Fleet action. After an inconclusive engagement near the island of Gavdos, the Regia Marina lost three cruisers and two destroyers during the night.
- 16 April, Battle of the Tarigo Convoy. An Italian convoy was attacked and destroyed. Two Italian destroyers were also lost along with the British HMS Mohawk.
- 20 May – 1 June, Battle of Crete. Series of actions supporting army in Crete, nine British warships were sunk by Axis air attacks.
- 24 May, Italian troop ship SS Conte Rosso was sunk by Royal Navy submarine HMS Upholder, with 1297 men killed and 1432 rescued.
- July, Operation Substance. A British convoy to Malta. The British destroyer HMS Fearless was lost to air attack.
- September, Operation Halberd. A British convoy to Malta. The transport ship Imperial Star was sunk by an Italian aerial torpedo.
- 8 November, Battle of the Duisburg Convoy. An Axis convoy was destroyed. The Italian destroyer Fulmine was also lost.
- 13 November. The carrier HMS Ark Royal was torpedoed and sunk by the German submarine U-81, greatly affecting the Royal Navy aero-naval capacity, as she had by far the greatest air complement among the British carriers.
- 25 November. While attempting an interception of Italian convoys in the Eastern Mediterranean, the British battleship HMS Barham was torpedoed and sunk by the German submarine U-331 with the loss of 862 crewmen. The dramatic footage of the event became one of the most eloquent documents of the Mediterranean campaign.
- 13 December, Battle of Cape Bon. An Italian fast convoy was attacked by Allied destroyers; the Italian light cruisers Alberico da Barbiano and Alberto di Giussano were torpedoed and sunk.
- 17 December, First Battle of Sirte. An indecisive, brief clash between the escorting fleet forces of two convoys.
- 19 December, Raid on Alexandria. Italian manned torpedoes attacked the British fleet. Two battleships were damaged and settled on the bed of the harbour; significantly, seen from the air, they appeared undamaged. They were raised and repaired several months later.

=== 1942 ===
- 22 March, Second Battle of Sirte. A British convoy and escort composed of light cruisers and destroyers were attacked by the Italian fleet, but managed to slip away, with two destroyers heavily damaged. But the Italian fleet managed to delay the convoy's arrival, thus, resulted in all four of the convoy's cargo ships being sunk during subsequent Axis air strikes the following morning.
- 15 June, Operation Harpoon. A British convoy resupplying Malta was intercepted by Italian cruisers and engaged by Axis aircraft; three merchantmen, a large tanker and the destroyer HMS Bedouin were sunk by air attacks combined with naval gunfire. The Polish destroyer ORP Kujawiak sank after hitting a mine while approaching Valletta. Twenty-nine Axis aircraft were shot down during the battle. Only two cargo ships from a convoy of six reached Malta, one of them damaged.
- 15 June, Operation Vigorous. A British convoy from Alexandria suffered heavy air strikes. It was eventually driven back by the Italian fleet.
- 15 August, Operation Pedestal. A British convoy resupplying Malta was attacked; HMS Manchester and nine merchantmen were sunk by Axis E-boats, aircraft and submarines; but vital supplies, including oil, were delivered
- November, Operation Stone Age. A British convoy reached Malta undisturbed.
- 2 December, Battle of Skerki Bank. An Italian convoy was attacked and destroyed.
- 11 December, Raid on Algiers. Italian manned torpedoes attacked Allied shipping, two steamships were sunk.

=== 1943 ===
- 16 April, Battle of the Cigno Convoy. A failed British attack at night by two destroyers on an Italian convoy. One of the Italian escorts, the Italian torpedo boat Cigno, was sunk. The British destroyer Pakenham was disabled during the battle and had to be scuttled when it became clear it would not be able to reach base. The 5000-ton transport ship Belluno and Italian torpedo boat Tifone, the latter loaded with aviation spirit, reached their destination safely.
- 3–4 May, Battle of the Campobasso Convoy. A successful British attack by three destroyers on the Italian transport Campobasso (taking supplies to Axis forces in Tunisia) with the escorting (800-ton displacement) torpedo boat Perseo. Both Perseo and Campobasso were sunk with no loss to the British.
- 2 June, Battle of the Messina Convoy. The British destroyer HMS Jervis and the Greek destroyer Vasilissa Olga carried out a night sweep along the Gulf of Squillace, Calabria, where they found a small two-ship convoy escorted by the Castore. Supported by a Wellington bomber which dropped flares on the target, the Allied units engaged the Italian steamers Vragnizza and Postumia. The destroyers lost track of the convoy after the intervention of the escort, which laid smoke and returned fire. Castore was disabled and sank before dawn, but her counterattack allowed the freighters to limp away. Vragnizza and Postumia, both damaged during the action, reached Messina at 16.30.
- 17 July, Operation Scylla. The Italian cruiser Scipione Africano, fitted with EC-3 Gufo radar, engaged four British Elco motor torpedo boats at night while on passage through the strait of Messina. One motor torpedo boat was sunk with all hands and three others damaged.

=== 1945 ===
- 18 March, Battle of the Ligurian Sea. Two British destroyers intercepted a German flotilla composed of one destroyer and two torpedo boats. The German destroyer limped away, while the two torpedo boats were sunk. This was the last deep-water German naval action of World War II.

== Notable Axis and Allied amphibious operations ==
=== 1941 ===
- 25-28 February, Operation Abstention, the British assault and occupation of Kastelorizo was thwarted by naval and air Italian forces.
- 20 May, start of the Battle of Crete, the Axis invasion of the island.

=== 1942 ===
- 14 September, Operation Agreement. The Allied assault on Tobruk was repulsed by Axis ground, air and naval forces.
- 8 November, start of Operation Torch, the Allied invasion of Vichy-controlled Morocco and Algeria.
- 10 November, Axis invasion of Tunis.

=== 1943 ===
- 9 July, the start of Operation Husky, the Allied invasion of Sicily.
- 3 September, Operation Avalanche, the start of the Allied invasion of Italy.
- 8 September, the start of the Dodecanese Campaign, the failed Allied attempt to control the Dodecanese Islands.
- 9 September, the start of the Allied Salerno landings in Italy.

=== 1944 ===
- 22 January, the start of Operation Shingle, the Allied landings at Anzio in Italy.
- 5 August, the start of Operation Dragoon, the Allied landings in southern France.

== See also ==
- Naval history of World War II
- Force H
- Force K
- Mediterranean U-boat Campaign (World War II)
- Military history of Italy during World War II
- Military history of the United Kingdom during World War II
- List of classes of British ships of World War II
- List of Classes of French ships of World War II
- World War II naval ships of the United States
- Regia Marina
- The Italian Navy in World War II

== Bibliography ==
- Blitzer, Wolf; Garibaldi, Luciano (2001). Century of War. New York: Friedman/Fairfax Publishers. ISBN 1-58663-342-2.
- Bragadin, A. (1957). Italian Navy in World War II. Annapolis: US Naval Institute. OCLC 1150441.
- Caravaggio, Angelo (2006). "The Attack at Taranto: Tactical Success, Operational Failure". Naval War College Review. 59 (3). ISSN 0028-1484. JSTOR 26396738.
- Clodfelter, Micheal (2017). Warfare and Armed Conflicts A Statistical Encyclopedia of Casualty and Other Figures, 1492–2015. Jefferson: McFarland. ISBN 9781476625850.
- Greene, Jack; Massignani, Alessandro (1998). The Naval War in the Mediterranean, 1940–1943. London: Chatham Publishing. ISBN 978-1-86176-057-9.
- Mollo, Andrew (1981). The Armed Forces of World War II. New York: Crown. ISBN 0-517-54478-4.
- O'Hara, Vincent (2014). On Seas Contested: The Seven Great Navies of the Second World War. Annapolis: Naval Institute Press. ISBN 978-1-61251-400-0.
- O'Hara, Vincent (2013). Struggle for the Middle Sea:the Great Navies at War in the Mediterranean 1940–1945. Annapolis: Naval Institute Press. ISBN 978-1612514086.
- Roskill, S. W. (1960b). The White Ensign: British Navy at War, 1939–1945. Annapolis: Naval Institute Press. OCLC 782497.
- Sadkovich, James (1994). The Italian Navy in World War II. Westport: Greenwood Press. ISBN 0-313-28797-X.
- Walker, Ian W. (2003). Iron Hulls, Iron Hearts: Mussolini's Elite Armoured Divisions in North Africa. Marlborough: Crowood. ISBN 9781861266460.
