= Sanremo railway station (1872) =

Former railway station in Italy

San Remo
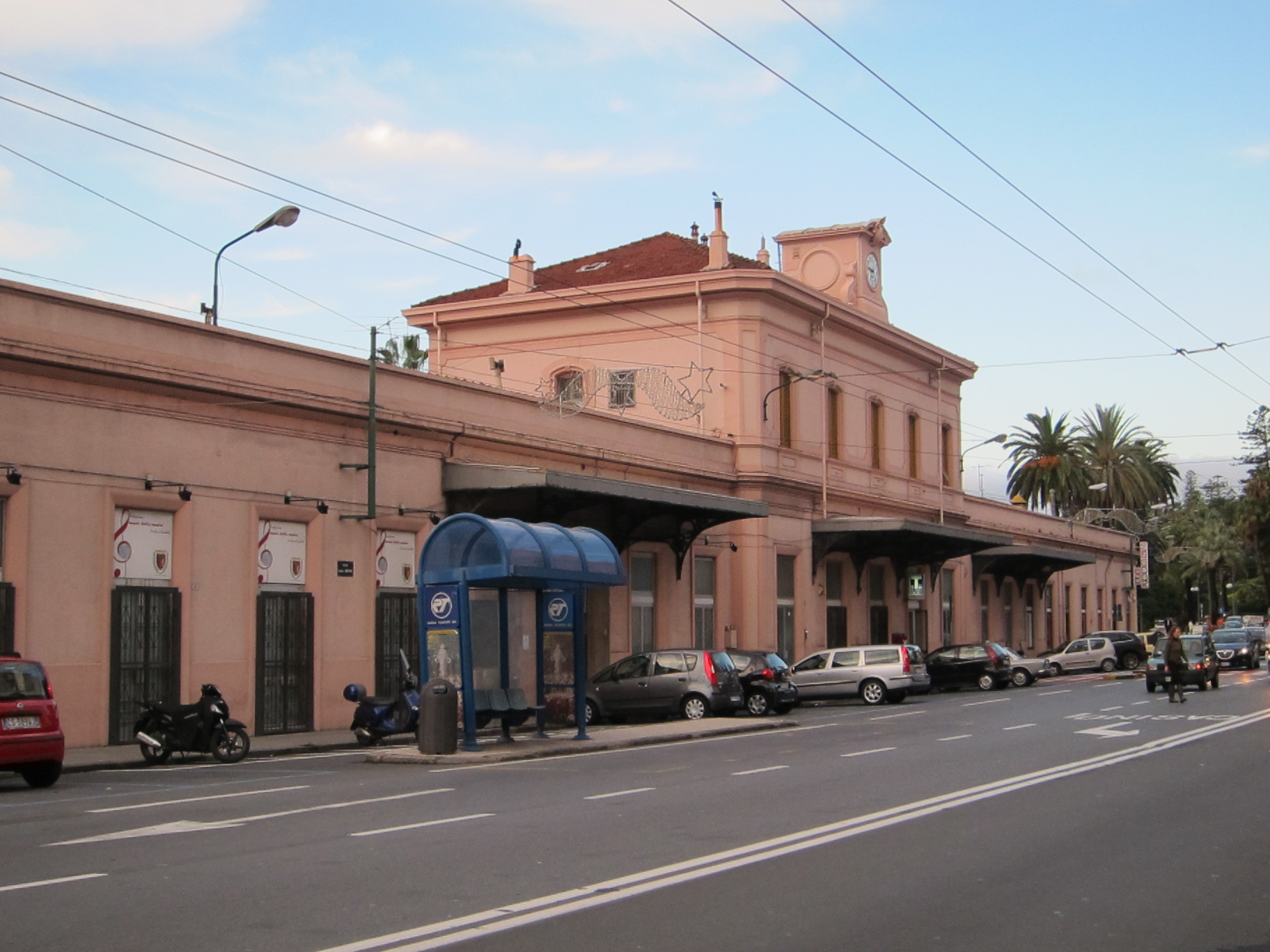
- Building of the old station in 2011

General information
- Location: Piazza Cesare Battisti, 5, Sanremo (IM)
- Coordinates: 43°48′50″N 7°46′18″E
- System: Italian State Railways (Ferrovie dello Stato)
- Line: Genoa–Ventimiglia line
- Platforms: 3
- Tracks: 3 + 2 for the freight + 1 rod trains maneuver.

Construction
- Structure type: at-grade, crossing station

History
- Opened: 25 January 1872
- Closed: 24 September 2001
- Former names: Sanremo (until the 1980s)
Location

San Remo railway station was the first station of Sanremo; was closed in 2001 due to the opening of the new double-track of the Genoa-Ventimiglia railway line from San Lorenzo to Bordighera and was replaced by a new station underground.

== History ==
It was opened on 25 January 1872, with the opening of the track Savona and Ventimiglia of the Genoa–Ventimiglia line. It was closed on 24 September 2001, as a result of the double-tracking between San Lorenzo al Mare and Ospedaletti. Soon after it was abandoned the station was deprived of the overhead line and the tracks to asphalt the sediments and the docks.

From 1913 to 1942 the square in front of the station had an interchange with the Ospedaletti-Sanremo-Taggia tramway.

On 21 April 1942 the Italian Riviera trolleybus was inaugurated and was in service until being temporarily suspended in December 2019.

The station, previously called with the correct name "Sanremo", assumed the new name "San Remo" in the 1980s.

== Overview ==
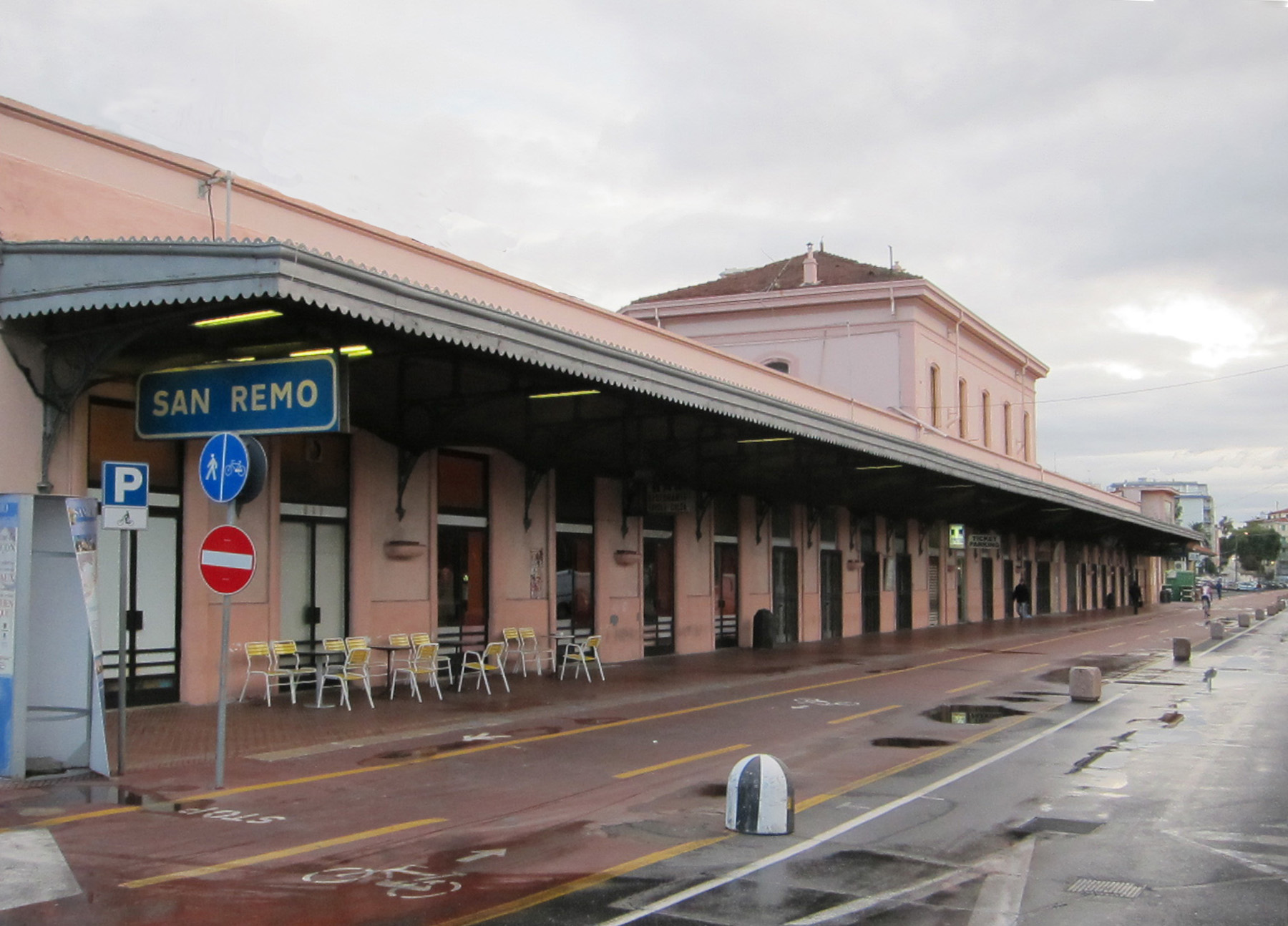
The platforms in 2011

The old San Remo Station building had 3 passenger tracks, as well as 2 for freight trains, and 1 for rod trains maneuver.

The passenger building still exists as well as the tobacco shop, while the bar and the kiosk, present inside the structure since its inauguration, have been closed.

The area hosts events and exhibitions in what were once the railway freight warehouses. On the former track level there is a parking lot and a stretch of the bike lane opened in 2008.
