= Sanremo =

City in Liguria, Italy

Sanremo Sanreumo (Ligurian)
- Comune
- Città di Sanremo
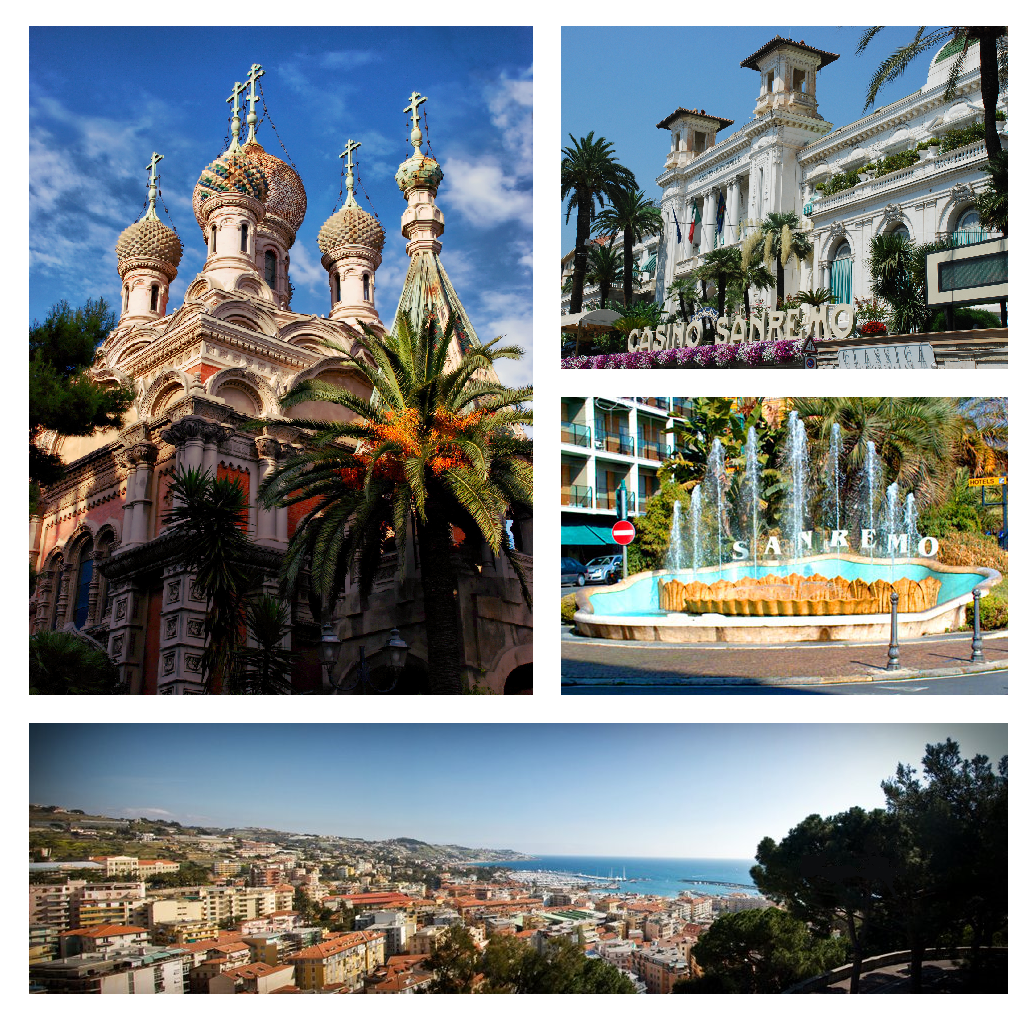
- Clockwise from top left: Sanremo Russian style Orthodox Church; Sanremo Casino; Zampillo Fountain (Fontana dello Zampillo); panoramic view of downtown Sanremo, Teatro Ariston, Portosole yacht harbour and Ligurian Sea

- Flag Coat of arms

- Location within Italy Location within Liguria
- Coordinates: 43°49′03″N 07°46′30″E
- Country: Italy
- Region: Liguria
- Province: Imperia (IM)
- Frazioni: Borello, Bussana, Bussana Vecchia, Coldirodi, Gozo Superiore, Gozo Inferiore, Poggio, San Bartolomeo, San Giacomo, San Giovanni, San Romolo, Verezzo, Verezzo San Donato, Verezzo Sant'Antonio, Casa Serena, Giordani, Modeni, Moreno, Rodi, Bevino

Government
  - Mayor: Alessandro Mager

Area
  - Total: 55.52 km^{2} (21.44 sq mi)
- Elevation: 15 m (49 ft)

Population (30 November 2025)
  - Total: 53,182
  - Density: 957.9/km^{2} (2,481/sq mi)
- Demonym: Sanremesi or Sanremaschi
- Time zone: UTC+1 (CET)
  - Summer (DST): UTC+2 (CEST)
- Postal code: 18038
- Dialing code: 0184
- ISTAT code: 008055
- Patron saint: Saint Romulus
- Saint day: 13 October
- Website: Official website

Sanremo, (Note: Italian pronunciation: [sanˈrɛːmo]; Ligurian: Sanrémmo(ro), locally Sanreumo(ro) [saŋˈɾøːmu(ɹu)]; Occitan: Sant Rémol.) also spelled San Remo in English and formerly in Italian, is a comune (municipality) on the Mediterranean coast of Liguria, in northwestern Italy. Founded in Roman times, it has a population of about 53,000, and is known as a tourist destination on the Italian Riviera. It hosts numerous cultural events, such as the Sanremo Music Festival and the Milan–San Remo cycling classic. Italo Calvino, the most significant figure of 20th century Italian literature, spent his formative years here.

== Name ==
While it is often stated in modern folk stories that Sanremo is named after a legendary Saint Remus, the name of the city is actually a phonetic contraction of Sant'Eremo di San Romolo ("Holy Hermitage of Saint Romulus"), which refers to Romulus of Genoa, the successor to Syrus of Genoa. In Ligurian, its name is San Reumo or San Reumoro.

The non-univerbated spelling San Remo features on ancient maps of Liguria and maps of the Republic of Genoa, Medieval Italy, the Kingdom of Sardinia, and the Kingdom of Italy; it was used in 1924 in official documents under Mussolini. This form of the name, now superseded by Sanremo both officially and in common usage, still appears on some road signs and, more rarely, in unofficial tourist information.

== History ==
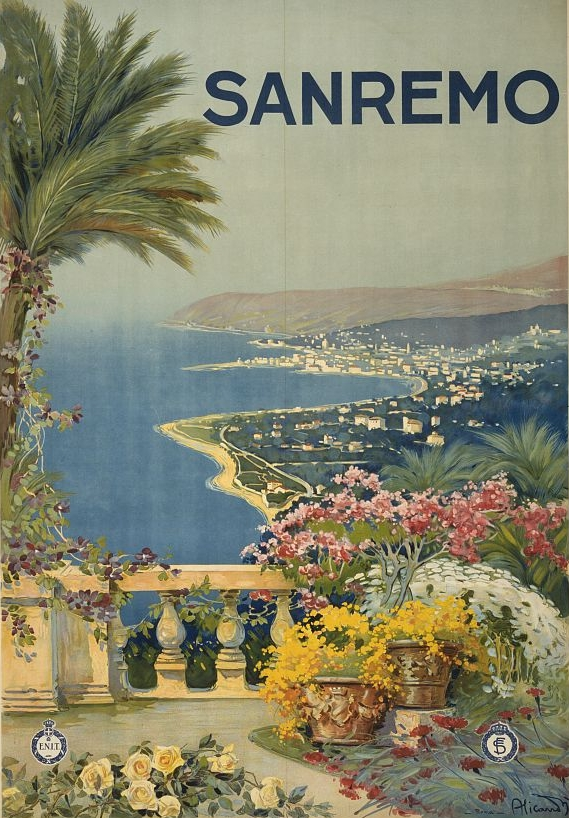
Sanremo poster from the 1920s

Once the Roman settlement of Matutia or Villa Matutiana, Sanremo expanded in the early Middle Ages when the population moved to the high grounds. The nobility built a castle and the walled village of La Pigna to protect the town from Saracen raids.

At first subjected to the countship of Ventimiglia, the community later passed under the dominion of the Genoese bishops. In 1297 they sold it to the Doria and De Mari families. It became a free town in the second half of the 15th century, after which it expanded to the Pigna hill and at Saint Syrus Cathedral. The almost perfectly preserved old village remains.

Sanremo remained independent of the Genoese Republic. In 1753, after 20 years of fierce conflicts, it rose against Genoese hegemonical attempts. At that time Genoa built the fortress of Santa Tecla, situated on the beach near the port. The fortress was used as a prison until 2002. It is now used as a museum.

After the French domination and the Savoy restoration in 1814, Sanremo was annexed to the Kingdom of Sardinia. From the middle of the 18th century, the town grew rapidly, in part due to the development of tourism, which saw the first grand hotels built and the town extended along the coast. The Empress "Sissi" of Austria, Empress Maria Alexandrovna of Russia, and Emperor Nicholas II of Russia took vacations in Sanremo, while Swedish chemist Alfred Nobel made it his permanent home.

The San Remo conference, 19–26 April 1920, of the post-World War I Allied Supreme Council determined the allocation of Class "A" League of Nations mandates for the administration of the former Ottoman-ruled lands of the Middle East by the victorious powers. The most notable of these was the British Mandate of Palestine.

In 1972, the first public demonstration for the defence of the dignity and rights of gay people in Italy took place in Sanremo in protest against an international congress on sexual deviance organized by the Catholic-inspired Italian Center for Sexology.

== Economy ==
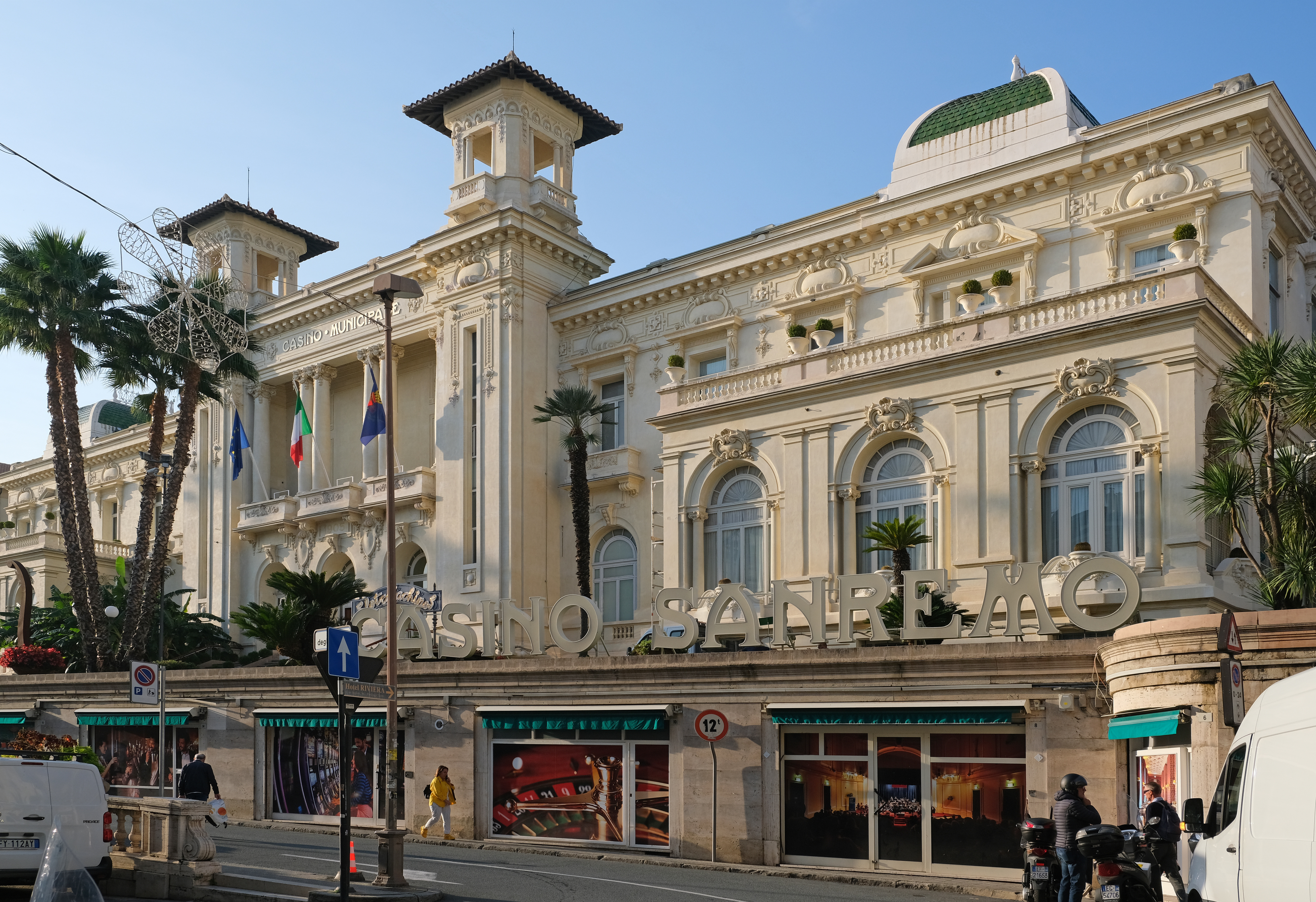
Sanremo Municipal Casino

Sanremo's Mediterranean climate and attractive seacoast setting on the Italian Riviera make it a popular tourist destination. Besides tourism, the city is active in the production of extra virgin-grade olive oil, whose regional "designation of origin" is protected (D.O.P., Denominazione di Origine Protetta). It is one of the agricultural commodities in western Liguria and in particular within the province of Imperia. Sanremo is known as the City of Flowers (la Città dei Fiori), this being another important aspect of the economy of the city. The nearby towns of Arma di Taggia, Bordighera and Ospedaletti are also involved in the cultivation of flowers for the international flower market.

The Municipal Casino, built in 1905, is an example of Art Nouveau building. The Ariston Theatre offers an annual series of concerts, operas and theatre plays. The Symphony Orchestra is one of twelve symphony orchestras recognized by the state of Italy; it performs some 120 concerts throughout the year, most in the Municipal Casino's Opera Theatre.

== Transportation ==
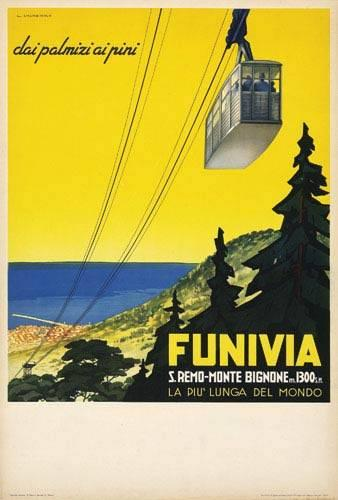
Sanremo cable car advertising, 1937

The city is connected to Genoa and to Ventimiglia, the border city with France, by the A10 motorway, whose last part is also known as the Autostrada dei Fiori ("Motorway of Flowers"). It has a large number of elevated sections with viaducts that give a panoramic view of the coast. The A10 joins the French A8 highway at the border between Ventimiglia and Menton. Together these national routes are part of the European route E80. The A10 motorway is a toll road, and the A8 demands a toll in sections, and some sections are free of charge. When travelling from Italy into France, one does not pay until after the towns of Menton and Monaco.

Other roads of importance are the SS1, the "Aurelia Bis", which connects Sanremo to Taggia. This is a non-toll bypass route. The coast road is the via Aurelia or SS1 and follows the route of a Roman road. This can be heavily congested when it passes through towns, as it has only one lane in either direction for most of the way around Sanremo. A 28.5 km-long (17.7 mi) trolleybus line along the via Aurelia linked Sanremo with both Taggia and Ventimiglia from 1942 to the 2020s (not since 2002 to Taggia), but it closed in early 2024, having not operated since mid-2021.

The closest airport to Sanremo is in France, the Côte d'Azur International Airport in Nice, 45 minutes away by car. The railway connects the city to other Ligurian cities like Imperia, Genoa and to Nice, Milan, Turin and Rome.

The railway line used to be along the coast, running close to the sea, and providing a view for travellers. The line has been moved further north and underground, which allows for faster trains; Sanremo railway station was relocated next to the City Hall. The city has refurbished the old railway line and converted it into a bike route and pedestrian area. There are several bike hire kiosks along the route and a choice of beaches to visit in either direction from San Remo. The path stretches 24 km (15 mi) between Ospedaletti in the west and San Lorenzo al Mare in the east.

== Geography ==
=== Climate ===
Sanremo experiences a hot-summer Mediterranean climate (Köppen climate classification Csa).

Climate data for Sanremo (2004–2020)
Month	Jan	Feb	Mar	Apr	May	Jun	Jul	Aug	Sep	Oct	Nov	Dec	Year
Mean daily maximum °C (°F)	13.3 (55.9)	13.4 (56.1)	15.1 (59.2)	18.0 (64.4)	21.0 (69.8)	24.4 (75.9)	27.0 (80.6)	27.1 (80.8)	24.8 (76.6)	21.2 (70.2)	17.4 (63.3)	14.7 (58.5)	19.8 (67.6)
Daily mean °C (°F)	10.7 (51.3)	10.6 (51.1)	12.3 (54.1)	15.2 (59.4)	18.2 (64.8)	21.7 (71.1)	24.4 (75.9)	24.5 (76.1)	22.0 (71.6)	18.6 (65.5)	14.7 (58.5)	12.0 (53.6)	17.1 (62.8)
Mean daily minimum °C (°F)	8.1 (46.6)	7.9 (46.2)	9.5 (49.1)	12.4 (54.3)	15.3 (59.5)	19.0 (66.2)	21.8 (71.2)	21.8 (71.2)	19.3 (66.7)	15.9 (60.6)	11.9 (53.4)	9.4 (48.9)	14.4 (57.8)
Average precipitation mm (inches)	100 (4.0)	89 (3.5)	91 (3.6)	81 (3.2)	76 (3.0)	38 (1.5)	20 (.8)	43 (1.7)	56 (2.2)	110 (4.2)	97 (3.8)	79 (3.1)	880 (34.6)
Source 1: Climi e viaggi
Source 2: Enea, Intellicast

== Demographics ==
Historical population

Year	Pop.	±%
1861	12,464	—
1871	12,890	+3.4%
1881	18,760	+45.5%
1901	22,440	+19.6%
1911	27,013	+20.4%
1921	26,093	−3.4%
1931	29,583	+13.4%
1936	33,003	+11.6%

Year	Pop.	±%
1951	40,464	+22.6%
1961	55,209	+36.4%
1971	62,210	+12.7%
1981	61,170	−1.7%
1991	56,003	−8.4%
2001	50,608	−9.6%
2011	54,137	+7.0%
2021	52,918	−2.3%

Source: ISTAT

=== Ethnic groups and foreign minorities ===
As of 1 January 2025, Sanremo had 7,792 foreign residents, representing 14.7% of the resident population. The largest foreign community is from Romania, with 13.5% of all foreign residents in the country, followed by Morocco and Bangladesh.

== Culture ==
=== Music festival ===
The Ariston Theatre hosts the celebrated annual Sanremo Music Festival, which has been held in the city since 1951. This festival inspired the Eurovision Song Contest, which started in 1956, and has often been used to select the Italian entry for the European contest. The internationally notable song "Nel blu, dipinto di blu", popularly known as "Volare", was performed at this festival for the first time by Domenico Modugno in 1958. The festival is so popular among Italians that it is often referred to simply as "Il Festival" (The Festival). Other events include the Tenco Prize (autumn), a song contest for authors dedicated to the memory of Luigi Tenco; the Flowers Parade in January/February in which every city of the Italian Riviera presents an original composition of flowers displayed on a Carnival/Mardi-Gras style moving car; and the summer Firework International Contest in the second week of August also called Ferragosto.

=== Media ===
The municipality has:

- Radio Sanremo, which has been operating since the mid-1970s on FM, digitally on the DAB+ mux, and streaming from its website.
- Radio Città dei Fiori, a local station, has been broadcasting since 2025 on FM 88.8 MHz, in DAB+ on the Media Dab mux (Liguria) channel 6D, via the web, app, and smart speakers.

=== Cuisine ===
The culinary specialities of Sanremo and its environs include Sardenara, Focaccia, Focaccia alle Cipolle, Torta Verde, Farinata and Taggiasca olives.

=== Gambling ===
The Sanremo Casino (Casino Municipale di Sanremo) opened in 1905 and has operated continuously since then with the exception of the years of World War II. For much of its history, the casino was tolerated or granted exceptions to Italian gambling laws in order to allow the resort to compete with the casino towns in nearby France and Monaco.

Sanremo hosts an annual poker tournament as part of the European Poker Tour. The city is widely accepted as the origin of the five-card stud variant telesina.

== Sports ==
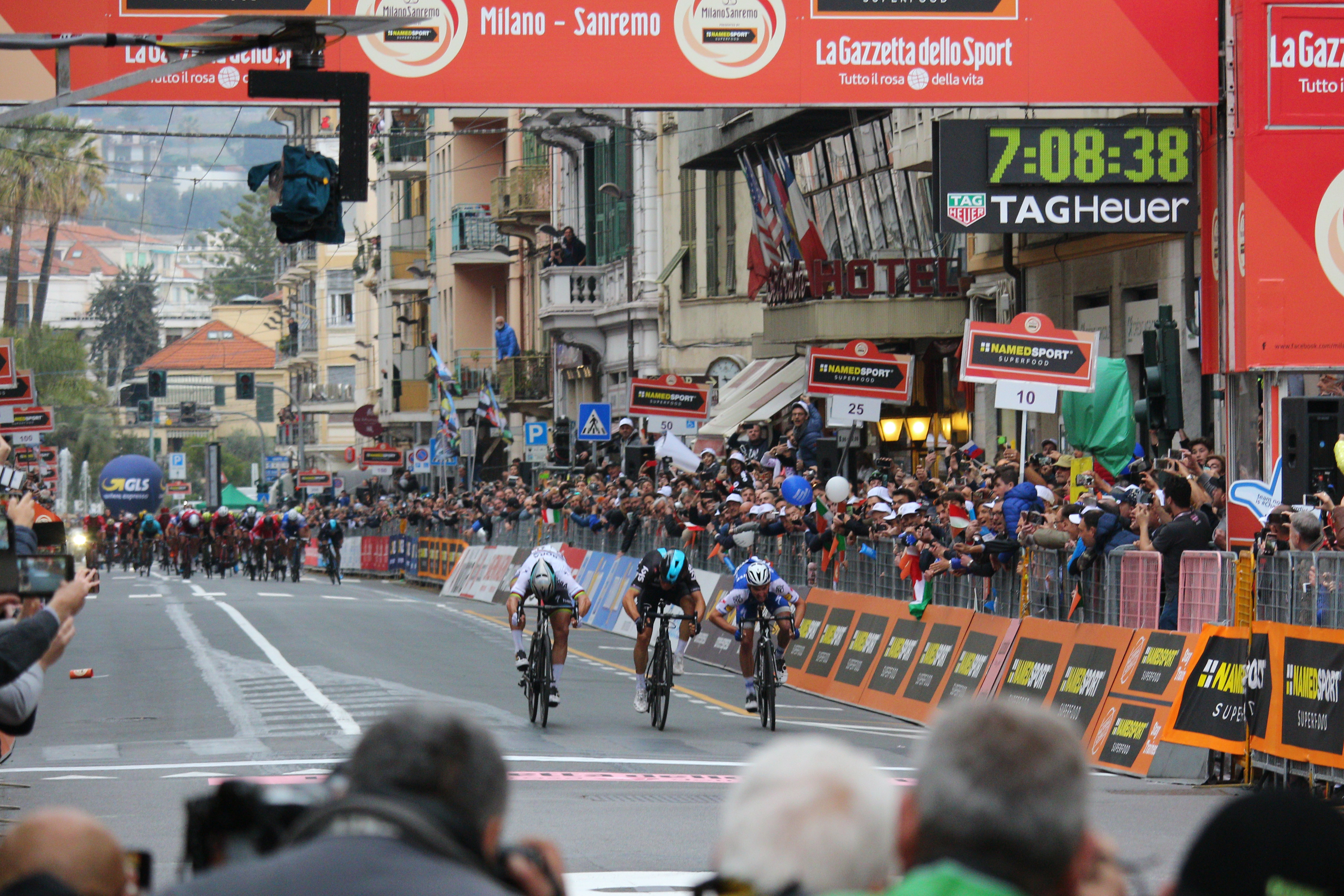
Michał Kwiatkowski winning the 2017 Milan-San Remo by narrowly outsprinting Peter Sagan and Julian Alaphilippe on the Via Roma

The Rallye Sanremo is a rally competition that was part of the FIA World Rally Championship from 1973 to 2003, when it was replaced by Rally d'Italia Sardegna on the island of Sardinia, in hosting the Italian round of the WRC. It is now part of European Rally Championship. Formerly a mixed surface event (tarmac and gravel), the rally has later been an all-tarmac event and takes place around the mountains.

Sanremo is the finish of the classic Milan–San Remo cycle race. It is considered to be a "monument" – one of the five most important one-day races of the cycling season. Milan – San Remo is traditionally held in March and is one of the first major fixtures of the cycling season. It is usually the longest professional one-day race in the cycling season, giving the race a unique character. From 1999 to 2005, a women's race, the Primavera Rosa, was organized alongside the men's but at a shorter distance. From 2025, a women's race (Milan–San Remo Women) is held as part of the UCI Women's World Tour.

The most important local football club is the Sanremese which has played also in Serie B and in Serie C.

Juan Manuel Fangio won his first European Grand Prix in Sanremo-Ospedaletti in 1949.

== Notable people ==
=== Natives ===
- Giotto Maraghini, Italian admiral (1882–1946).
- Giovanni Ermiglia, Italian nonviolent activist.
- The Italian actor and comedian Carlo Dapporto was born in Sanremo and became a household name in post-war Italy.
- Italian director and cinematographer Mario Bava was born in Sanremo in 1914.
- Italian tennis player Fabio Fognini was born in Sanremo.
- Alex Liddi, who was born in Sanremo, became the first native Italian to play Major League Baseball, in 2011 with the Seattle Mariners.

=== Died or are buried in Sanremo ===
- The Venerable Giorgio Baldassarre Oppezzi, a monk who died in 1525, and whose body, it is claimed, was later discovered to be incorrupt, is buried here in the church of Santa Maria degli Angeli.
- Edward Lear, English artist, illustrator and writer known for his nonsense poetry and limericks, lived and died in Sanremo. His tombstone is in the Foce Cemetery.
- Alfred Nobel bought a villa in Sanremo in 1891 and died there in 1896. Since 2002 it has housed a permanent exhibit on the most important discoveries of the 19th century including the research interests of Nobel himself. Sanremo continues to maintain its ties with Nobel, long after his death. Each 10 December (the date that Nobel died in 1896) large quantities of flowers sent by the province of Imperia, the city of Sanremo and the Board for Tourist Promotion of the Riviera dei fiori adorn the annual Nobel Prize Award Ceremony and Nobel Banquet in Stockholm.
- Mohammad Ali Shah Qajar, Shah of Persia from 1907 to 1909, died in Sanremo on 5 April 1925.
- Mehmed VI, the last Sultan of the Ottoman Empire, died in Sanremo on 16 May 1926.
- Fausto Zonaro, the last Court Painter to the Ottoman Empire, died in San Remo on 19 July 1929. He was buried with public honours in La Foce cemetery. On his gravestone, underneath an Ottoman tughra, it states that Zonaro was the court painter of the Ottoman Empire.
- Italian-born sculptor Giuseppe Moretti lived in Sanremo in his final years and died here in February 1935. Moretti designed the world's largest cast iron statue, of the Roman god Vulcan (56 ft or 17 m), which stands atop Red Mountain in Birmingham, Alabama (US). The statue is the symbol of the city.
- Italian singer Luigi Tenco died in Sanremo shortly after his performance at the 1967 Italian Song Festival.
- Edward James, British poet known for his patronage of the surrealist art movement, died in Sanremo on 2 December 1984.

=== Temporary residents ===
- The writer Tobias Smollett stayed a few days in Sanremo in 1765 and described it thus: "St. Remo is a pretty considerable town, well-built upon the declivity of a gently rolling hill...There is very little plain ground in this neighbourhood; but the hills are covered with oranges, lemons, pomegranates and olives....The women of St. Remo are much more handsome and better tempered than those of Provence." Travels Through France and Italy (1766).
- Empress Maria Alexandrovna, consort of Alexander II of Russia, spent the winter of 1874 in Sanremo and as a gift to the city she donated the palms along the seaside walk of Corso Imperatrice (Empress Avenue).
- Italian writer Italo Calvino spent his youth in Sanremo and many of his novels, including Il Barone Rampante, are reminiscent of his attachment to the city.
- The Sicilian playwright and Nobel Prize winner Luigi Pirandello lived in Sanremo in 1933–34 and was appointed artistic director of the Casino.

== Twin towns – sister cities ==
Sanremo is twinned with:

- Menton, France
- Atami, Japan (1976)
- Helsingør, Denmark
- Karlskoga, Sweden

== See also ==
- Sanremo railway station
- Sanremo railway station (1872)
- U.S. Sanremese Calcio
- Sanremo Festival
