= Mario Falangola =

Italian admiral

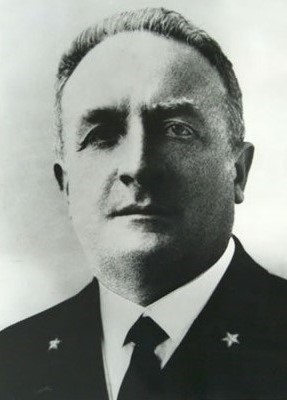
- Born: 9 August 1880; Rome, Latium, Italy
- Died: 14 July 1967 (aged 86); Rome, Latium, Italy
- Military career
- Allegiance: Kingdom of Italy; Italian Social Republic
- Branch: Regia Marina
- Service years: 1899–1945
- Rank: Ammiraglio di Squadra (Admiral)
- Commands: Argo (submarine); F 7 (submarine); Lorenzo Marcello (submarine); Tigre (destroyer); Leone (destroyer); Giulio Cesare (battleship); Naval Command Sicily; La Spezia Naval Base; Submarine Squadron/ Submarine Fleet Command; Corps of Port Captaincies
- Conflicts: Italo-Turkish War; World War I; Adriatic Campaign; World War II; Battle of the Mediterranean
- Awards: Silver Medal of Military Valor (three times); Bronze Medal of Military Valor (twice)

Mario Falangola (9 August 1880 – 14 July 1967) was an Italian admiral during World War II.

== Early life and career ==
Mario Falangola was born in Rome in 1880 and was admitted to the Italian Naval Academy in Livorno in 1899, graduating as ensign in 1902. In 1911-1912, with the rank of Lieutenant, he participated in the Italo-Turkish War aboard the armored cruiser Giuseppe Garibaldi. When Italy entered World War I, Falangola was initially embarked on the battleship Leonardo Da Vinci, but after a short time he was transferred to the submarine service; in 1916 he became commander of the submarine Argo, and later of the submarine F 7. At the command of the latter, Falangola sank on 12 February 1918 the small Austro-Hungarian auxiliary vessel Pelagosa (245 GRT), and on 11 August 1918 the troop transport Euterpe (2,270 GRT), causing the loss of 555 Austro-Hungarian troops. He was later given command of the submarine Lorenzo Marcello; in total, for his actions in command of submarines during World War I, Falangola received three Silver Medals of Military Valor and two Bronze Medals of Military Valor, as well as two promotions for war merit.

In the interwar period, with the rank of Captain, he commanded in 1929 the destroyers Tigre and Leone, and in 1932 the battleship Giulio Cesare. That same year he was promoted to Rear Admiral and appointed Naval Commander of Sicily and then commander of the La Spezia Naval Base. In 1935 he was promoted to Vice Admiral and appointed inspector of the new constructions and commander of the submarine fleet; in October of the same year he attended the testing of the first SLC manned torpedoes, in La Spezia. The positive results of the test led him to order the building of a further two SLCs. In 1937 it became Admiral, and in 1939 he was briefly given command of the Corps of Port Captaincies.

== World War II and aftermath ==
He later became commander of the Submarine Squadron (consisting of the whole Italian submarine fleet); he held this role at the entrance of Italy into World War II (10 June 1940) and kept it until December 1941, directing the submarine operations of the Regia Marina in the Battle of the Mediterranean. On 9 December 1941, immediately after writing a long report which highlighted deficiencies of the Italian submarine branch (in terms of training, technical characteristics of submarines, operational doctrine, cooperation with the Air Force), Falangola was removed from office and appointed commander of the Corps of Port Captaincies, and was replaced in command of the submarine fleet by Admiral Antonio Legnani.

A fervent Fascist, after the 8 September 1943 armistice Falangola immediately spoke out in favor of cooperation with the German forces, and during meetings at the Ministry of the Navy he tried – without much success – to convince other officers to do the same. He immediately joined the Italian Social Republic, and on 30 September 1943 he became Commissioner for the Navy for the Open City of Rome. He left this office on 25 December 1943, again assuming the general command the Port Captaincies that had remained in the territory of Italian Social Republic; he held this role until April 1945. His sons, Carlo and Ettore, also joined the RSI as officers in Junio Valerio Borghese's Decima Flottiglia MAS; they were employed against the Italian resistance and were both captured and executed by the partisans.

Having joined the German troops in their retreat towards Brenner Pass, at the beginning of May 1945 Falangola gave himself up in Bolzano to the Northern Italy National Liberation Committee, which in turn handed him over to the local U.S. command, that interned him in a POW camp in Coltano, Pisa, where he remained for a short time. After his release, he was deprived of his rank by the Italian authorities for having adhered to the Italian Social Republic, and he was sentenced to four years in jail (later condoned) by a military court in Rome. The sentence, however, was repealed once by the Supreme Military Court "for not having committed the crime", and then a second time for an amnesty. He was discharged from the Navy in June 1945.

In 1955, his service record was reviewed and the cancellation from the rolls with loss of rank was revoked. He died in Rome on 14 July 1967.
