= Supermarina =

- Active: 1 June 1940 – 12 September 1943
- Country: Kingdom of Italy
- Branch: Regia Marina
- Role: Italian Navy General Staff
- Headquarters: Rome, later Santa Rosa (near Rome)
- Engagements: Battle of the Mediterranean

Commanders
- Deputy Chief of Staff: Odoardo Somigli; Inigo Campioni; Luigi Sansonetti

Supermarina was the headquarters of the Italian Royal Navy (Regia Marina) established on 1 June 1940, just before Italy entered the Second World War. The Army and Air Force equivalents were Superesercito and Superaereo, which were subordinate to Comando Supremo the Supreme Command of the Italian armed forces.

== History ==
The plan to centralise control of naval operations began in November 1934. Supermarina headquarters at Lungotevere Flaminio in Rome, was completed in 1938 and was inaugurated by Benito Mussolini on 14 October. When the capital was declared an open city, in 1943, Supermarina moved to Santa Rosa on the Via Cassia, about 20 km (12 mi) from Rome. The Santa Rosa headquarters remains the seat of Commander in Chief Naval Fleet (CINCNAV).

From 10 June 1940 to 8 September 1943, Supermarina supervised all Italian naval operations in the Battle of the Mediterranean, the Red Sea and the oceans. The head of Supermarina should have been the chief of staff of the Navy, the de facto commander was the deputy chief of staff. At the start of the war, the Chief of Staff of the Navy State was Admiral Domenico Cavagnari and the head of Supermarina was Admiral Odoardo Somigli. On 10 December 1940, Cavagnari was replaced by Admiral Arturo Riccardi and Admiral Inigo Campioni became Deputy Chief of Staff. In July 1941, Admiral Luigi Sansonetti became Deputy Chief of Staff. Supermarina was divided into several sections responsible for functions like decryption, strategic moves and communications.

Orders issued by Supermarina to the units and commands were taken in accordance with Comando Supremo. The commander of an Italian battle squadron had little discretion to depart from orders received from Supermarina and when circumstances changed he had to wait for new instructions from Supermarina. This centralisation caused serious problems, when situations evolved quicker than Supermarina could react. Later in 1940, Supermarina granted commanders more discretion over tactics but maintained strict orders not to engage superior enemy forces, which restrained the initiative of the commanders, to avoid losses that could not be replaced.

After 8 September 1943, Supermarina issued orders for the execution of the clauses of the Armistice of Cassibile, the transfer of all seaworthy ships into Allied-controlled ports and the scuttling or sabotage of ships unable to sail, to avoid their capture by the Germans and then ceased operations on 12 September 1943, following the German capture of Rome.
