= Trolleybuses in Sanremo =

Sanremo trolleybus system
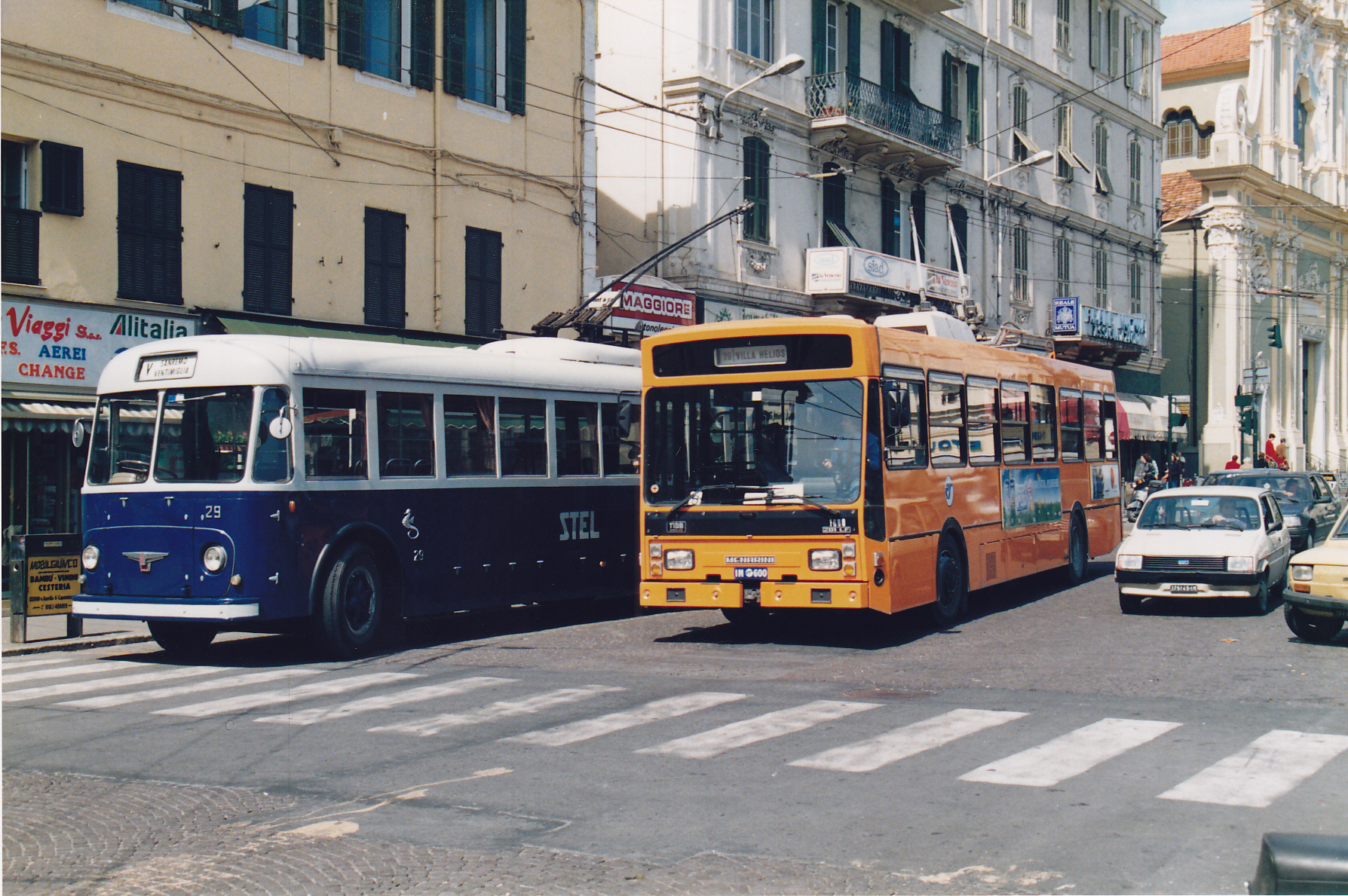
- Preserved historical trolleybus 29 and an active trolleybus in the city centre in 1991

Operation
- Locale: Sanremo, Liguria, Italy
- Open: 21 April 1942
- Close: February 2024 (decision not to reopen; trolleybus service had last operated circa August 2021)
- Routes: 3 (of which one last operated in 2002)
- Operators: 1942–1983: La Società Trasporti Elettrici Liguri; 1983 to 2024: Riviera Trasporti

Infrastructure
- Electrification: 600 V DC parallel overhead lines

Statistics
- Route length: 28.5 km (17.7 mi)
Overview
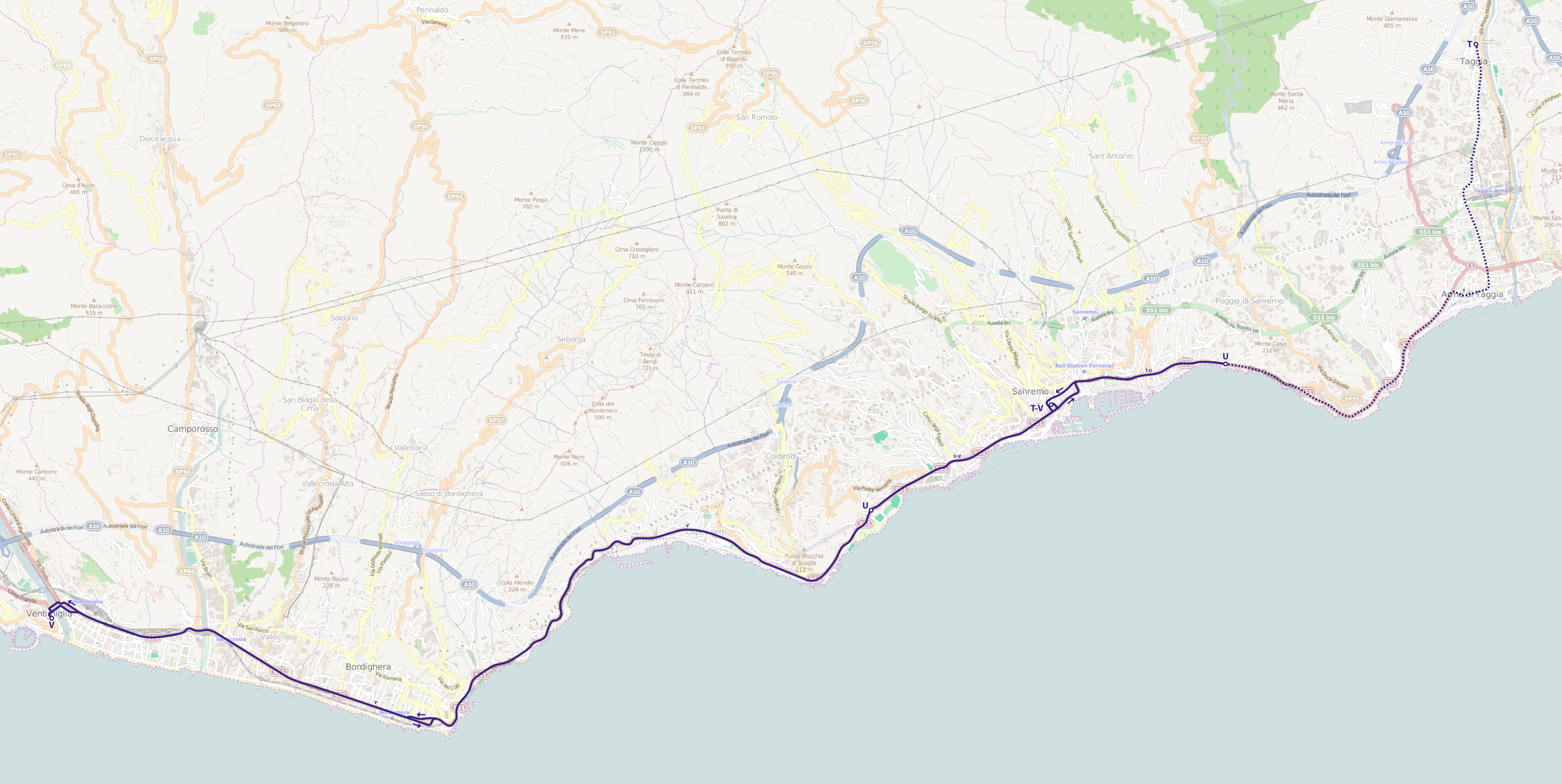
- Website: http://www.rivieratrasporti.it/ Riviera Trasporti (in Italian)

The Sanremo trolleybus system or San Remo trolleybus system (Italian: Rete filoviaria di Sanremo), also known as the Italian Riviera trolleybus (Italian: Filovia della Riviera dei Fiori), operated from 1942 to 2021 and was focused on the town and comune of Sanremo, in the region of Liguria, northwestern Italy.

Opened in 1942 and extended in two stages by 1951, the system consisted of three routes operating along different portions of a single 28.5 km-long (17.7 mi) corridor, linking the coastal towns of Ventimiglia and Taggia. The system formally closed in 2024, when, during a suspension of all trolleybus service that had lasted since mid-2021, operator Riviera Trasporti decided to make the suspension a permanent closure and began dismantling of the overhead wires.

== History ==
The trolleybus system on the Italian Riviera was built to replace two interurban tramways, the Taggia–Ospedaletti tramway and the Bordighera–Ventimiglia tramway. The new trolleybuses, unlike the trams, were also able to cope with the steep climbs between Ospedaletti and Bordighera.

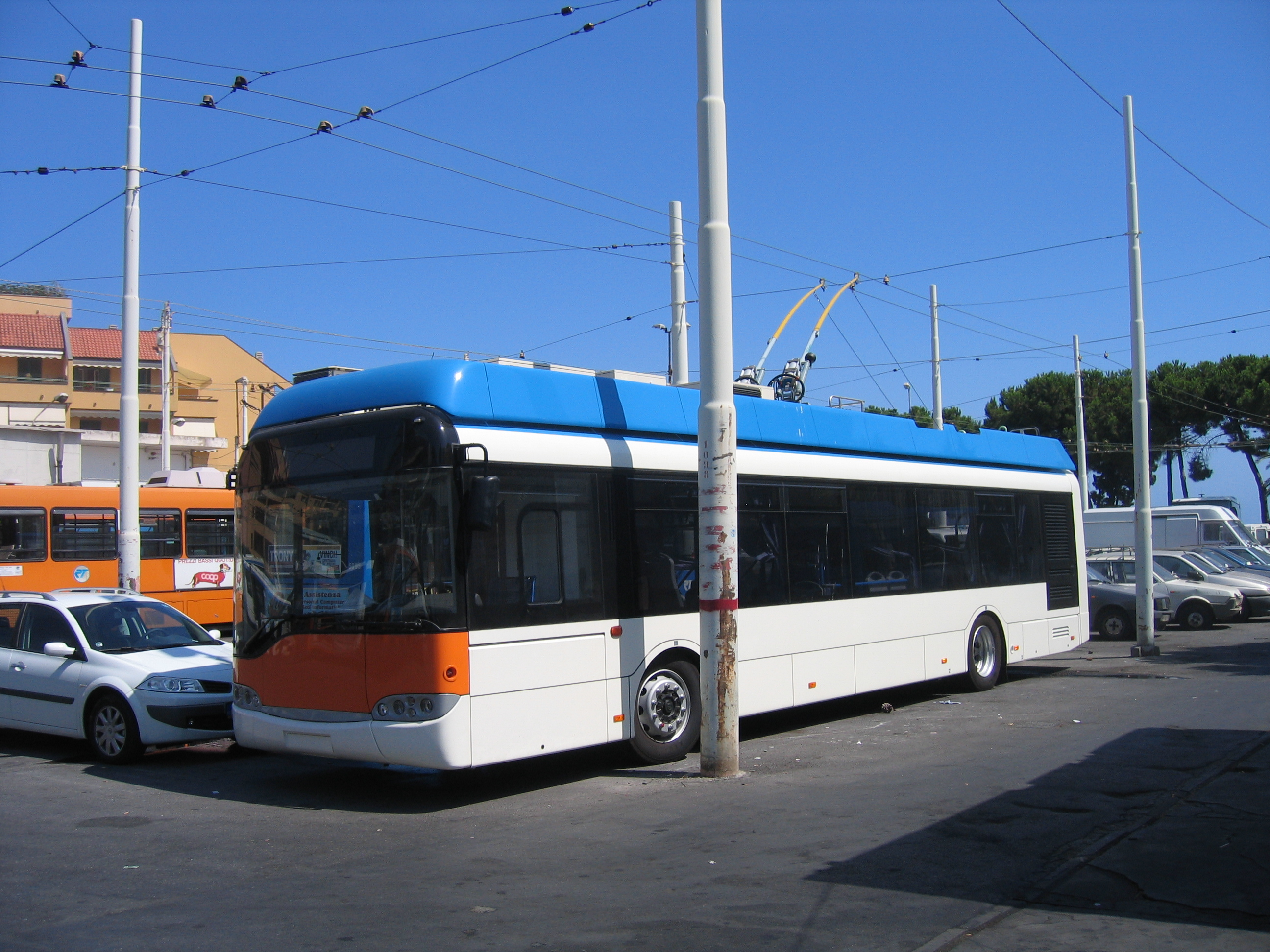
In the system's last years, the youngest trolleybuses in the fleet were two Solaris Trollino low-floor vehicles built in 2008.

The first trolleybus route, from Sanremo to Ospedaletti (9.15 km), was inaugurated on 21 April 1942, followed on 1 February 1948 by the second line (Sanremo–Taggia), and in 1951 by the Ospedaletti–Ventimiglia extension. The Sanremo–Taggia and Sanremo–Ventimiglia routes were designated as lines T and V, respectively. A third route, serving the urban area of Sanremo only and using the overhead wires already in place for lines T and V, began operation in 1958, designated line U. Route V was about 18 km long, route T 10 km (originally) and route U 5.75 km.

The trolleybus system was owned and operated by La Società Trasporti Elettrici Liguri (STEL) until 1983, when Riviera Trasporti SpA took over.

With the entry into service of new Iveco trolleybuses in 1984, urban route U was renumbered 20, and the Iveco vehicles as well as new Menarini trolleybuses delivered in 1988 displayed the route number as 20 on that service. However, with new Breda trolleybuses delivered in 1991, RT reverted to displaying the route as "U". The earlier, 1980s-built trolleybuses continued, concurrently, to show the route number as 20, until they were withdrawn or fitted with new destination signs, after which all trolleybuses displayed "U" on that service.

On 20 December 2001, a 700-metre (2,300 ft) branch was opened on line T to serve the then-new Taggia-Arma railway station. However, it was used for only a few months. In March 2002, line T service was converted indefinitely to motorbuses, due to roadworks. A succession of other road projects repeatedly delayed the reinstatement of trolleybus service, and ultimately trolleybus service never resumed on line T.

By the late 2010s, trolleybus operation had become intermittent, particularly on Ventimiglia route V, with several suspensions (with buses covering all service on the two remaining trolleybus routes, U and V). In February 2024, it was decided to close the system, and work to dismantle the overhead wires began. Trolleybuses last operated in service around August 2021, on route U, and probably not since 2019 on the Ventimiglia route.

== Routes ==
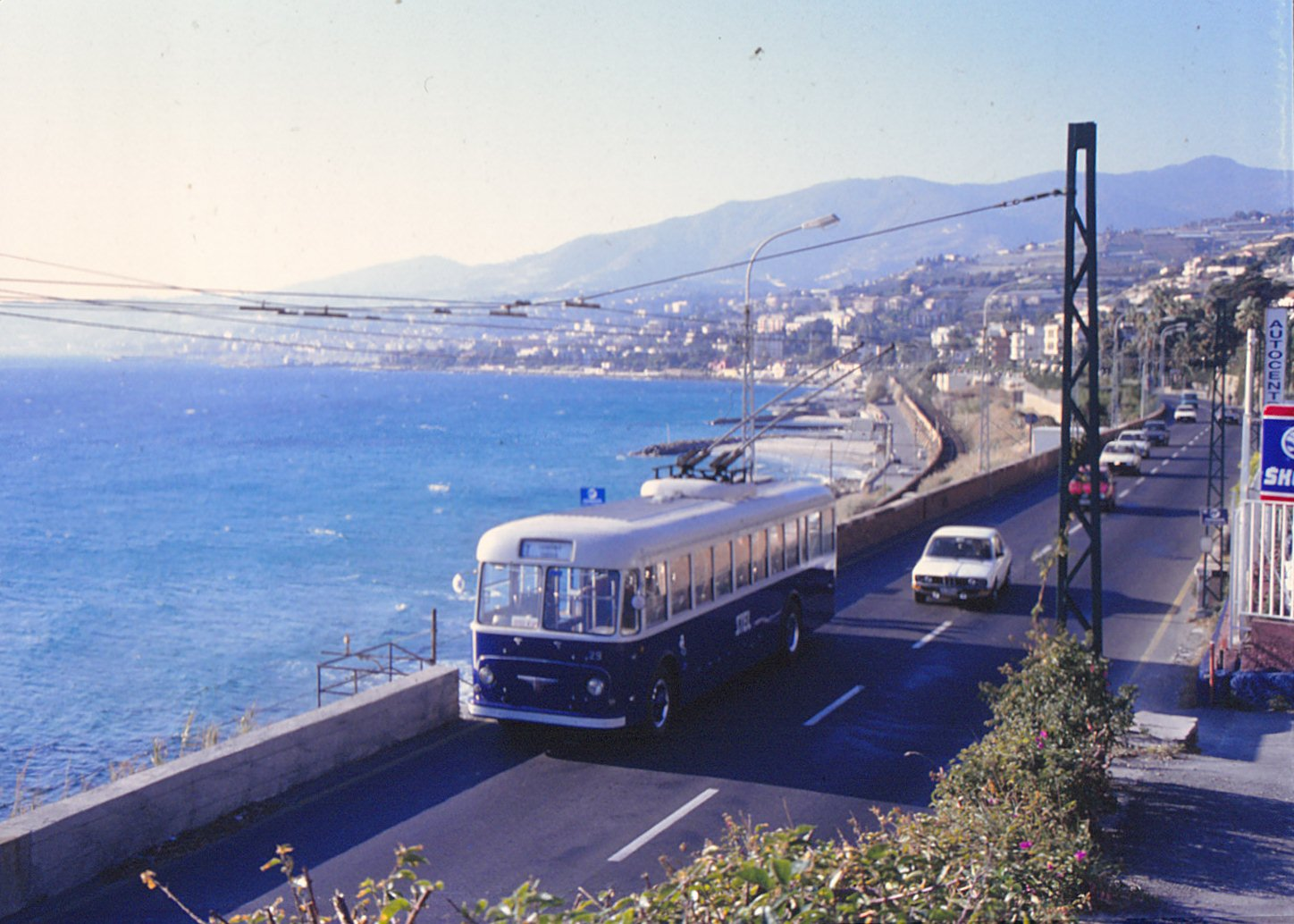
A scenic view along the Taggia route in 1988. This route last operated with trolleybuses in 2002.

Three services were operated along the single corridor comprising the Sanremo trolleybus system. They were:

- T Sanremo (bus station) ↔ Taggia (railway station) (last operated in 2002)
- U Sanremo urban service (La Brezza ↔ Villa Helios)
- V Sanremo (bus station) ↔ Ventimiglia (Piazza Costituente)

== See also ==
- Sanremo railway station
- List of trolleybus systems in Italy
