= Sanremo railway station =

Railway station in Sanremo, Italy

Sanremo
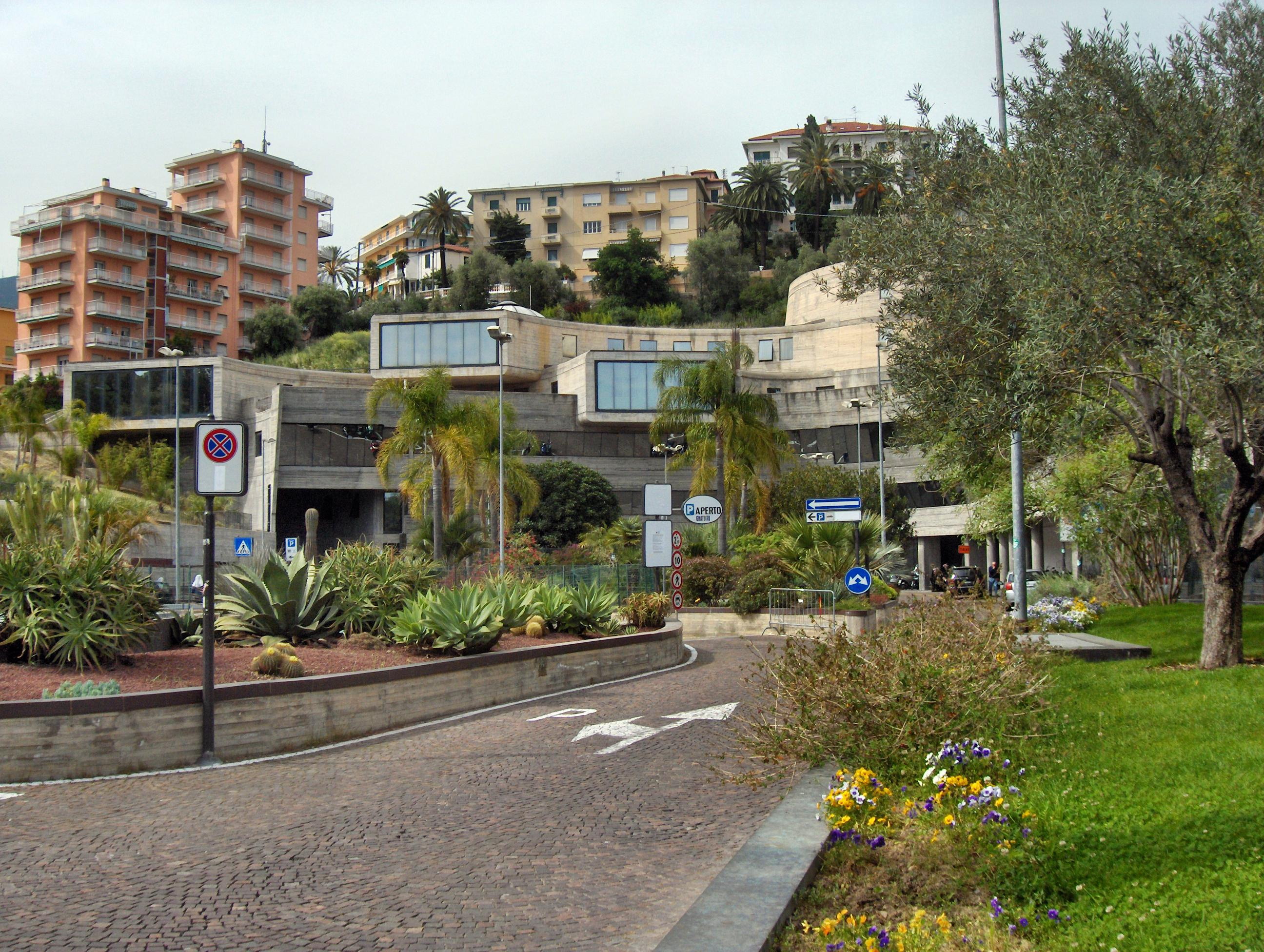
- Building of the new station in 2009

General information
- Location: Corso Cavallotti, Sanremo (IM)
- Coordinates: 43°49′19″N 7°47′04″E
- Line: Genoa–Ventimiglia line
- Tracks: 2

Construction
- Structure type: at-grade, crossing station

History
- Opened: 1872 (old station)
- Rebuilt: 2001 (actual station)
Location
- Location within Liguria Location within Northern Italy Location within Italy

Sanremo railway station is situated in the Italian city of Sanremo.

== History ==
It was opened on 27 September 2001, with the opening of the new double-track line between Bordighera and Imperia, which is a deviation of the Genoa–Ventimiglia line, built mainly in tunnel. The new station replaced an old picturesque station on a single track line that ran along the shore.

== Overview ==
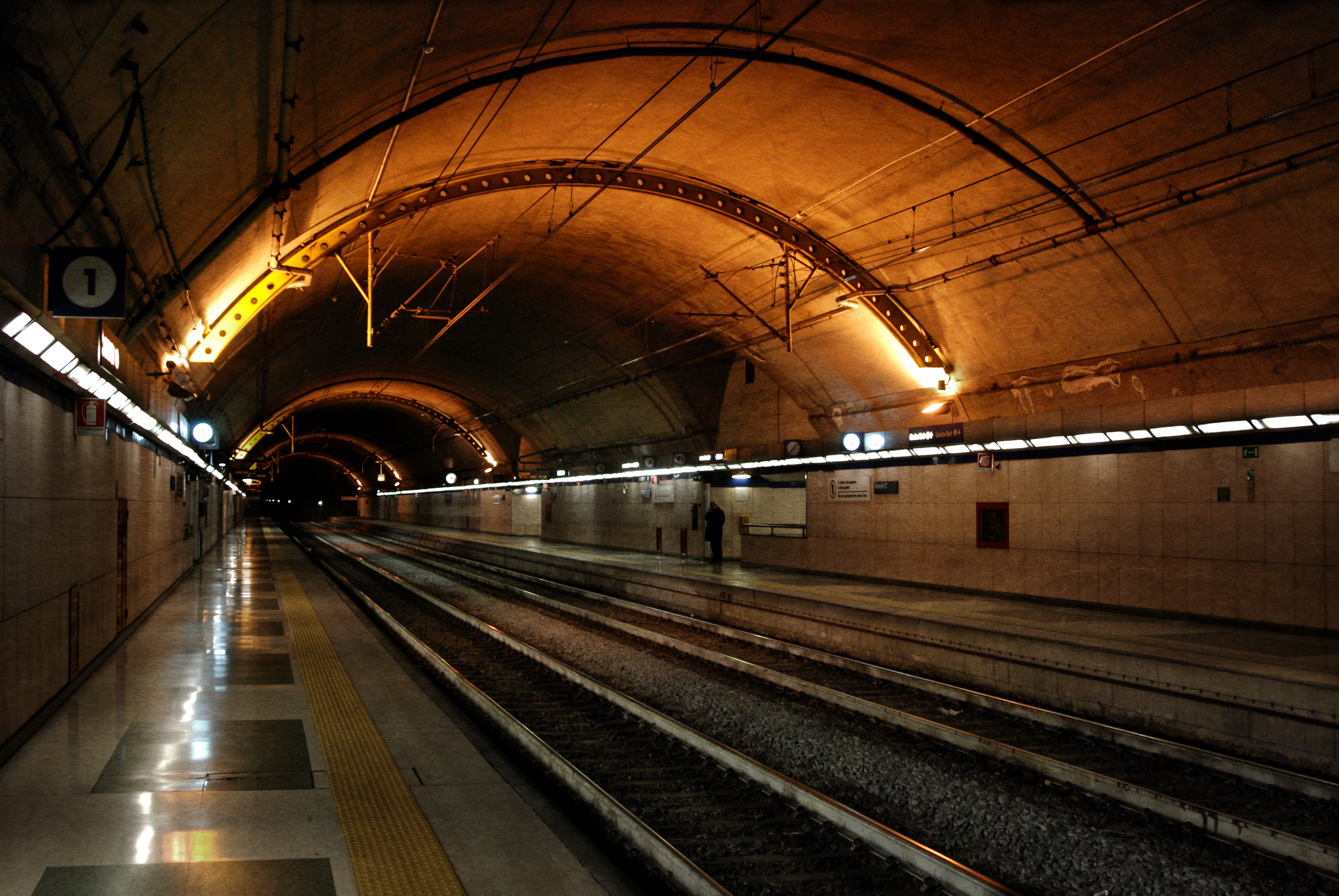
The platforms

The Sanremo station building contains a ticket hall, waiting room, information office, kiosk, and bar. The entrance building is connected to the platforms built in a tunnel by a long corridor, equipped with a moving walkway. Travel time is approximately 10 minutes. The station has two platforms connected by an underpass.

As Sanremo is an important tourist destination and a significant source of commuter traffic, the station has substantial traffic. All trains stop at the station. Most trains are regional or express; some are Intercity trains. The most frequent destinations to the west are Ventimiglia and Nice, and to the east Imperia, Savona, Genoa. It is directly accessible from Milan (about 3½ h), Turin (about 4 h) and Rome (about 7½ h).

== Old station ==
The old railway station of Sanremo was located in the middle of the town at Piazza Cesare Battisti, close to the coast.

== Train services ==
The station is served by the following services:

- Eurocity services Marseille - Cannes - Nice - Monaco - Ventimiglia - Genoa - Milan
