= Luigi Sansonetti =

Italian admiral

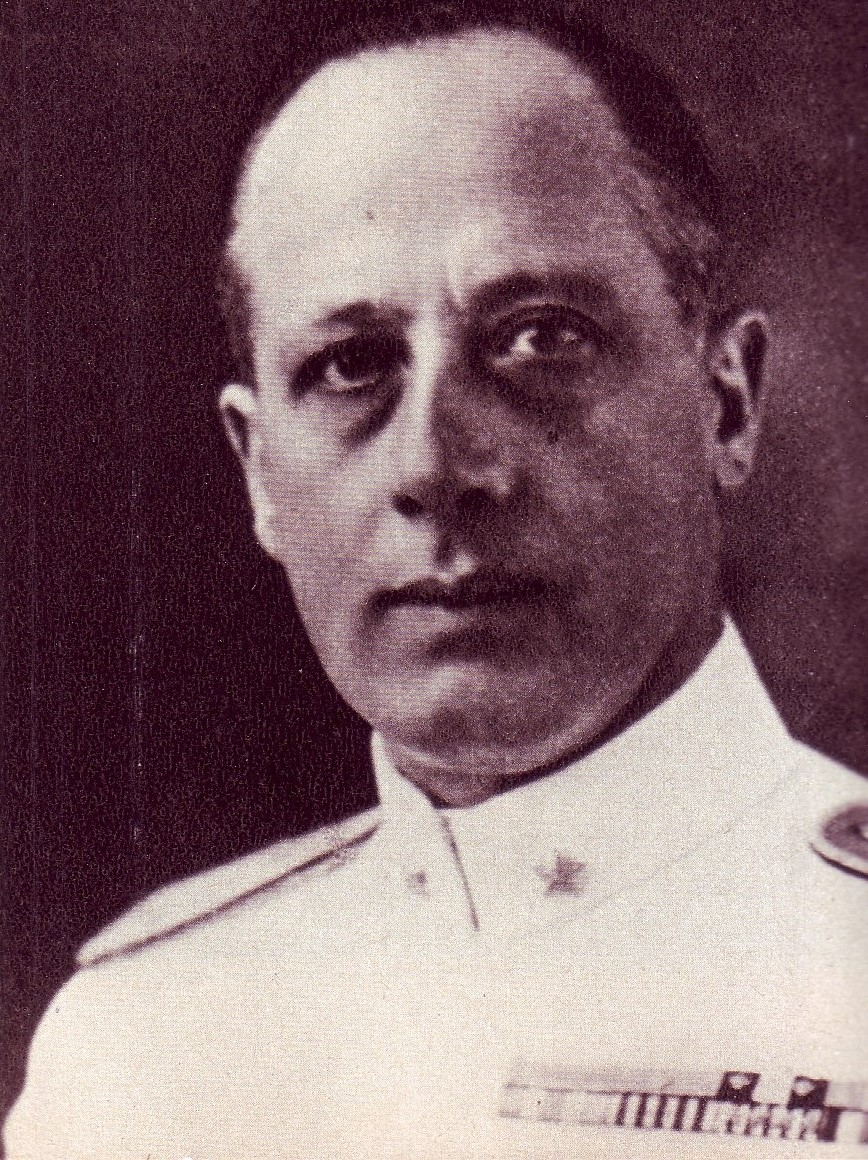
- Born: 22 February 1888; Rome, Latium, Italy
- Died: 7 November 1959 (aged 71); Rome, Latium, Italy
- Military career
- Allegiance: Kingdom of Italy
- Branch: Regia Marina
- Service years: 1905–1951
- Rank: Ammiraglio di squadra (Squadron Admiral)
- Commands: F 17 (submarine); Fiume (heavy cruiser); 7th Naval Division; 3rd Naval Division
- Conflicts: Italo-Turkish War; World War I; Adriatic Campaign; Spanish Civil War; World War II; Battle of the Mediterranean; Battle of Calabria; Battle of Taranto; Battle of Cape Spartivento; Operation White; Operation Excess; Operation Grog; Battle of Cape Matapan
- Awards: Silver Medal of Military Valor; Bronze Medal of Military Valor; German Cross in Gold

Luigi Sansonetti (22 February 1888 – 7 November 1959) was an Italian admiral during World War II.

== Early life and career ==
Luigi Sansonetti was born in Rome in 1888, and entered the Livorno Naval Academy in 1905; he graduated as an ensign in 1908. Between 1911 and 1912 Sansonetti, a young sub-lieutenant, fought in the Italo-Turkish War; he led a company of sailors in the landing at Tripoli, earning a Bronze Medal of Military Valor.

He was promoted to lieutenant in 1914; during World War I, he was initially assigned to the Command of the Battle Squadron, and was later given command of torpedo boats operating in the Adriatic Sea.

During the 1920s and early 1930s, Sansonetti commanded destroyers and then destroyer squadrons and flotillas; he was promoted to lieutenant commander in 1922, commander in 1926 and captain in 1932. In the same year he was assigned to the press office of the Head of Government, and in 1934 he became Chief of Staff of the Taranto Naval Department. In 1935 he was given command of the heavy cruiser Fiume, on board which he was involved in the early stages of the Spanish Civil War.

In late 1936, Sansonetti was assigned to the office of the Chief of Staff of the Navy, where he remained till 1939. In 1938, he was promoted to rear admiral, and in the following year he became vice admiral. In August 1939 he was given command of the 7th Cruiser Division, with flag on the light cruiser Eugenio di Savoia.

In the 1930s Sansonetti also wrote several essays on naval policy, and he was among the supporters of the building of new battleships (the Littorio class).

== World War II and later years ==
When Italy entered World War II, on 10 June 1940, Sansonetti was still in command of the 7th Cruiser Division. In this role, he participated in the Battle of Calabria on 9 July 1940. In August 1940 he was appointed commander of the 3rd Cruiser Division, with flag on the heavy cruiser Trieste.

In this role, Sansonetti took part in the Battle of Cape Spartivento, the Battle of Taranto and the Battle of Cape Matapan, as well as in some escort missions to Libya and in the contrast against Operation White, Operation Excess and Operation Grog. In this period, he was awarded a Silver Medal of Military Valor, the Knight's Cross of the Military Order of Savoy, a German Cross in Gold and a Grand Cross of the Order of the German Eagle. His son Vito was a lieutenant on board the destroyer Vittorio Alfieri, sunk in the battle of Cape Matapan; he was among the few survivors and was rescued and taken prisoner by a Greek destroyer, being liberated after the fall of Greece.

Sansonetti left the command of the 3rd Cruiser Division in April 1941, and in July he became Deputy Chief of Staff of the Italian Navy. He played a major role in the planning of the Regia Marina's strategy in the following two years, especially in the convoy war for the supply of Axis forces in North African Campaign.

When Italy signed an armistice with the Allies, on 8 September 1943, and Germany launched Operation Achse in order to occupy Italy and neutralized the Italian armed forces, Sansonetti remained at the naval headquarters in Rome (Supermarina) and assumed provisional command over the naval forces, while the Chief of Staff, Admiral Raffaele de Courten, followed Victor Emmanuel III in his escape towards Brindisi. In the next days, Sansonetti directed naval operations and issued orders about the armistice to ships and submarines at sea and shore commands; on 13 September 1943, after Rome surrendered to the Germans after a brief resistance, he gathered his officers and informed them that Supermarina had to cease all activities, on the Germans' orders. On 25 September Sansonetti left Rome and headed south on foot; he crossed the frontline and reached Brindisi, where the king and the government had taken refuge, after a dangerous and eventful journey. In Brindisi, he resumed his duties as Deputy Chief of Staff of the Navy.

In April 1944 Sansonetti became president of the High Council of the Navy, an office he held till February 1951. He died in Rome on 7 November 1959, after falling from his horse.

His son Ugo Sansonetti was a writer and athlete.

== Bibliography ==
- Charles D. Mallett, Mussolini and the Origins of the Second World War, 1933-1940, Basingstoke, Palgrave MacMillan Ltd., 2003, ISBN 1-4039-3774-5.
- Charles D. Pettibone, The Organization and Order of Battle of Militaries in World War II. Vol.VI, Milano, Trafford Publishing, 2010, ISBN 1-4269-4633-3.
