= Antonio Legnani =

Italian admiral (1888–1943)

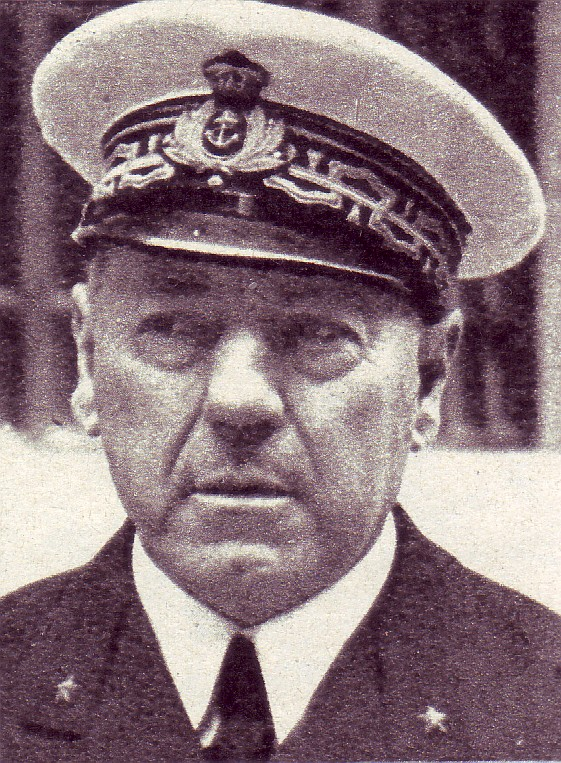
- Born: 28 January 1888; Asti, Piedmont, Italy
- Died: 23 October 1943 (aged 55); Vicenza, Veneto, Italy
- Military career
- Allegiance: Kingdom of Italy; Italian Social Republic
- Branch: Regia Marina
- Service years: 1905–1943
- Rank: Ammiraglio di Squadra (Squadron Admiral)
- Commands: Argonauta (submarine); Venezia (scout cruiser); Luciano Manara (submarine); Alberico Da Barbiano (light cruiser); Pola (heavy cruiser); Submarine Squadron/Submarine Fleet Command; 8th Naval Division
- Conflicts: Italo-Turkish War; World War I; Adriatic Campaign; Spanish Civil War; World War II; Battle of the Mediterranean; Battle of Calabria; Battle of Taranto; Battle of Cape Matapan; Malta convoys
- Awards: Silver Medal of Military Valor (twice); Bronze Medal of Military Valor (twice)

Antonio Legnani (28 January 1888 – 23 October 1943) was an Italian admiral during World War II.

== Early life and career ==
Born in Piedmont in 1888, Antonio Legnani entered the Naval Academy in Leghorn in 1905. After graduating as an ensign in 1908, he served for a few years on battleships and cruisers, and in 1911-1912 he participated in the Italo-Turkish War as a sub-lieutenant aboard the hydrographic survey ship Staffetta, in Red Sea. During this war, Legnani was promoted to lieutenant and appointed executive officer of the gunboat Giuliana.

In the first two years of World War I, Legnani served on several ships, mainly battleships, cruisers and auxiliary cruisers; he took part in the operations in Albania, obtaining a Silver Medal of Military Valor. In September 1917 he was given command of the submarine Argonauta, on board which he carried out 30 combat missions along the enemy coast, obtaining a second Silver Medal and two Bronze Medals of Military Valor.

After the war, Legnani, who had become a lieutenant commander, interchange shore assignments in Aegean, first in the Castelrosso naval base and later in Lakki (Leros), and periods on submarines and destroyers. In 1926 he was promoted to commander and given command of the scout cruiser Venezia, after which in 1928 he became deputy chief of staff of the Northern Tyrrhenian Naval Department and in 1930 he was given command of the submarine Luciano Manara. In 1931 Legnani was assigned to the Office of chief of staff at the Ministry of the Navy, and in 1933 he was promoted to captain and given command of the light cruiser Alberico da Barbiano. He then became chief of staff of the 5th Naval Division and, in 1936, commanding officer of the heavy cruiser Pola.

After another period at the Staff in the Ministry of the Navy, in 1937 Legnani was promoted to rear admiral and placed in command of the Regia Marina's submarine fleet, a position he held for two years; he also directed the clandestine submarine warfare during the Spanish Civil War, for which he was decorated with the Knight's Cross of the Military Order of Savoy. In 1938, for reasons that would remain unknown, he suspended the development of the "ML" apparatus - an ancestor of the snorkel - on submarines of the Regia Marina, despite four years of trials having yielded positive results; Legnani also ordered the demolition of the "ML" apparatuses already produced up to that time. The result was that Italian submarines were never equipped with snorkels until after the Second World War. In 1939 Legnani was promoted to the rank of vice admiral and given command of the 8th Naval Division (with flag on the light cruiser Luigi di Savoia Duca degli Abruzzi, which he still commanded when Italy entered World War II on 10 June 1940).

== World War II ==
From June 1940 to June 1941 Legnani, as the commander of the 8th Naval Division, participated in the battles Calabria, Taranto and Cape Matapan, as well as in countering the British operations "Hats" (29 August-1 September 1940) and "MB 5" (29 September to 2 October 1940), aimed at supplying Malta. After leaving the command of the 8th Division, on 10 December 1941 he was appointed commander of the Italian submarine fleet (replacing Admiral Mario Falangola), a role that he kept after his promotion to admiral in 1942. He directed Italian submarine operations in the Mediterranean until the 8 September 1943 armistice; in this period he was also decorated with the German Iron Cross second-class, as well as Officer's Cross of the Military Order of Savoy.

An ardent supporter of the Fascist regime, after 8 September 1943 Legnani immediately decided to cooperate with the German forces, and adhered to the Italian Social Republic, being appointed its Secretary of State to the Navy on 23 September 1943 (the day of its foundation). Less than a month later, however, on 20 October 1943, Admiral Legnani lost his life in a car accident near Vicenza,

His son Emilio also served in the Italian Navy, receiving the Gold Medal of Military Valor for his actions in the Black Sea during World War II.
