= Giotto Maraghini =

Italian admiral

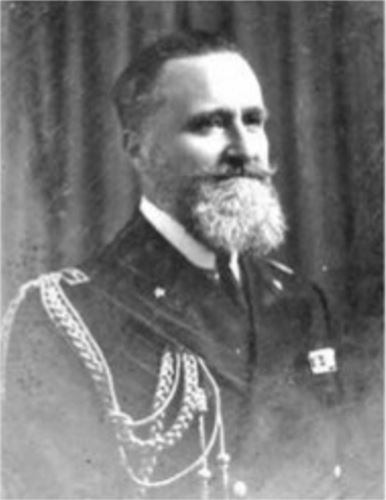
- Born: 16 November 1882; Sanremo, Kingdom of Italy
- Died: 10 April 1946 (aged 63); Rome, Kingdom of Italy
- Military career
- Allegiance: Kingdom of Italy
- Branch: Regia Marina
- Service years: 1902-1945
- Rank: Admiral
- Commands: Volturno (gunboat); Atropo (submarine); H 7 (submarine); Sebastiano Veniero (submarine); Luigi Galvani (submarine); Des Geneys (submarine); Gorizia (heavy cruiser); Brindisi Naval Fortress Area; Submarine Fleet C-in-C; 3rd Cruiser Division; 8th Cruiser Division; Naval Department of La Spezia
- Conflicts: Italo-Turkish War; World War I; World War II
- Awards: Silver Medal of Military Valor (twice); War Cross for Military Valor; War Merit Cross; Order of the Crown of Italy; Order of Saints Maurice and Lazarus; Colonial Order of the Star of Italy

Giotto Maraghini (16 November 1882 – 10 April 1946) was an Italian admiral during World War II.

== Biography ==
He was born in Sanremo, province of Imperia, on 16 November 1882, the son of Edoardo Maraghini, principal of the Lyceum of Vercelli. He entered the Royal Naval Academy of Livorno in 1899, graduating with the rank of ensign in 1902. He served on various ships, including the armoured cruiser Giuseppe Garibaldi; after commanding the gunboat Volturno with the rank of lieutenant, he was assigned on the armoured cruiser Pisa, participating in the Italo-Turkish War (1911- 1912) in which he earned a War Cross for Military Valor for distinguishing himself in command of a landing company in Tobruk and Derna.

During the First World War he served on submarines; he began the war as executive officer aboard the Atropo, of which he later assumed command, sinking on 4 June 1916 the Austro-Hungarian steamer Albanien. He was later given command of a more modern submarine, H 7, being promoted to lieutenant commander in 1918; by the end of the war he had been awarded two Silver Medals of Military Valor and a War Merit Cross. He continued to serve on submarines even after the war, commanding Sebastiano Veniero and Luigi Galvani, until 1923, when he was appointed Deputy Chief of Staff of the command-in-chief of the Fleet, embarking on the battleship Conte di Cavour.

In 1924 he was promoted to commander; he was later sent to Monfalcone to follow the outfitting of the new Pisani-class submarines (commanding the Des Geneys in the summer of 1929), and between 1929 and 1931 he held the position of Chief of Staff of the submarine fleet command. In 1930 he was promoted to captain and in 1930 he assumed command of the heavy cruiser Gorizia. In 1932-1933 he served as chief of staff of the 2nd Naval Division, after which he was in command of the defence of the La Spezia Naval Base and then of the Brindisi Naval Fortress Area.

He was promoted to rear admiral in 1934 and vice admiral in 1936, being appointed commander of Maricosom, the command-in-chief of the Italian submarine fleet; between 1937 and 1938 he was in command of the 3rd Naval Division, with flag on the heavy cruiser Trieste, and then the 8th Naval Division, with flag on the light cruiser Duca degli Abruzzi. He was general director of personnel and military and scientific services of the Royal Italian Navy from 1938 to 1939, and naval attaché in Berlin 1940-1941, and after promotion to admiral in 1941 he was president of the Superior Council of the Navy and of the coordination committee of technical projects. On 15 April 1943 he became Commander-in-Chief of the Naval Department of La Spezia.

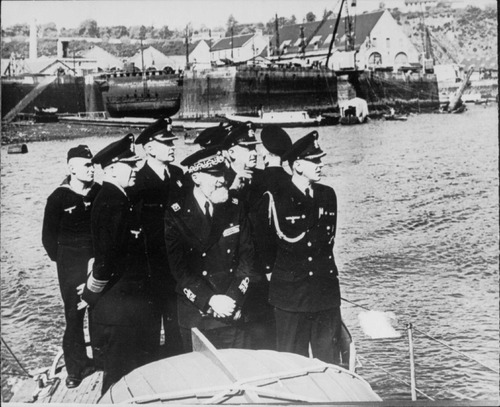
Maraghini with German officers inspecting the French port of Brest, November 1940

After the proclamation of the Armistice of Cassibile on 8 September 1943, he gave orders that all unseaworthy ships in La Spezia should be scuttled or sabotaged, while all seaworthy ships were to sail for Allied-controlled ports. Over thirty military vessels (the old light cruiser Taranto, three destroyers, five torpedo boats, six submarines, three corvettes, one minelayer, one ammunition transport, two naval tankers, two landing craft, five military tug, and two motor torpedo boats) were thus scuttled before German forces occupied La Spezia on 10 September. Maraghini evaded capture and remained in hiding in German-controlled territory until 4 June 1944, when he presented himself in Rome at the Ministry of the Navy and was assigned to the Cabinet of the Minister, where he remained available until 16 November 1945 when he retired from active service due to having reached age limits. He died in Rome on 10 April 1946.
