= List of Classes of French ships of World War II =

This is a list of French ship classes of World War II. This includes ship classes used by the French Third Republic, Vichy France, and Free France.The sections of the last are in chronological order with the first ships into service being first and the last ships into service being last.

Due to there being three French factions in World War II, I will note beside each class its French users. The abbreviation FTR beside a class shows it was in service with the Third French Republic, VF indicates it was in service with Vichy France, and FF shows it was in service with Free French forces.

== Aircraft Carrier ==
- French aircraft carrier Béarn- Béarn

== Seaplane tender ==
- French seaplane carrier Commandant Teste- Commandant Teste

== Battleships ==
- Courbet-class battleship- Courbet, France, Jean Bart, and Paris.
- Bretagne-class battleship- Bretagne, Lorraine, and Provence.
- Dunkerque-class battleship- Dunkerque, and Strasbourg.
- Richelieu-class battleship- Richelieu, and Jean Bart.

== Cruisers ==
=== Heavy cruisers ===
- Duquesne-class cruiser- Duquesne, and Tourville
- Suffren-class cruiser- Suffren, Colbert, Foch, and Dupleix
- French cruiser Algérie- Algérie

=== Light cruisers ===
- Duguay-Trouin-class cruiser- FTR, VF and FF
- French cruiser Jeanne d'Arc (1930)- FTR, VF and FF
- French cruiser Émile Bertin- FTR, VF and FF
- La Galissonnière-class cruiser- FTR, VF and FF

=== Minelaying cruiser ===
- French cruiser Pluton- FTR

== Destroyers ==
=== Large destroyers ===
- Chacal-class destroyer- FTR, VF and FF
- Guépard-class destroyer- FTR and VF
- Aigle-class destroyer-FTR and VF
- Vauquelin-class destroyer- FTR and VF
- Le Fantasque-class destroyer- FTR, VF and FF
- Mogador-class destroyer- FTR and VF

=== Small destroyers ===
- Bourrasque-class destroyer- FTR, VF and FF
- L'Adroit-class destroyer- FTR, VF and FF
- Le Hardi-class destroyer- FTR and VF
- La Melpomène-class torpedo boat- FTR, VF and FF
- French destroyer La Combattante (British Hunt Class destroyer)-FF

== Submarines ==
- Sirène-class submarine (1925)- FTR and VF
- Ariane-class submarine- FTR and VF
- Circé-class submarine (1925)- FTR and VF
- Argonaute-class submarine- FTR, VF and FF
- Orion-class submarine- FTR and FF
- Diane-class submarine (1930)- FTR and VF
- Saphir-class submarine (1928)- FTR, VF and FF
- Requin-class submarine- FTR, VF and FF
- Redoutable-class submarine (1928)- FTR, VF and FF
- French submarine Surcouf- FTR and FF
- Minerve-class submarine- FTR, VF and FF
- Aurore-class submarine- FTR and VF
- French submarine Curie (P67)(British U-class submarine)- FF
- French submarine Narval (T4)(Captured Italian Acciaio-class submarine)- FF

== Avisos/sloops ==
- Arabis-class sloop- FTR
- French ship Ville d'Ys- FTR and VF
- Arras-class aviso-FTR, VF and FF
- Bougainville-class aviso- FTR, VF and FF
- Élan-class sloop- FTR, VF and FF
- Chamois-class minesweeping sloop- FTR, VF and FF

== Escorteurs/Escorts ==
- Flower-class corvette- FF
- River-class frigate- FF
- PC-461-class submarine chaser- FF
- Cannon-class destroyer escort- FF
