= Attack on Convoy BN 7 =

Naval engagement in the Red Sea during WWII

- Part of The Second World War
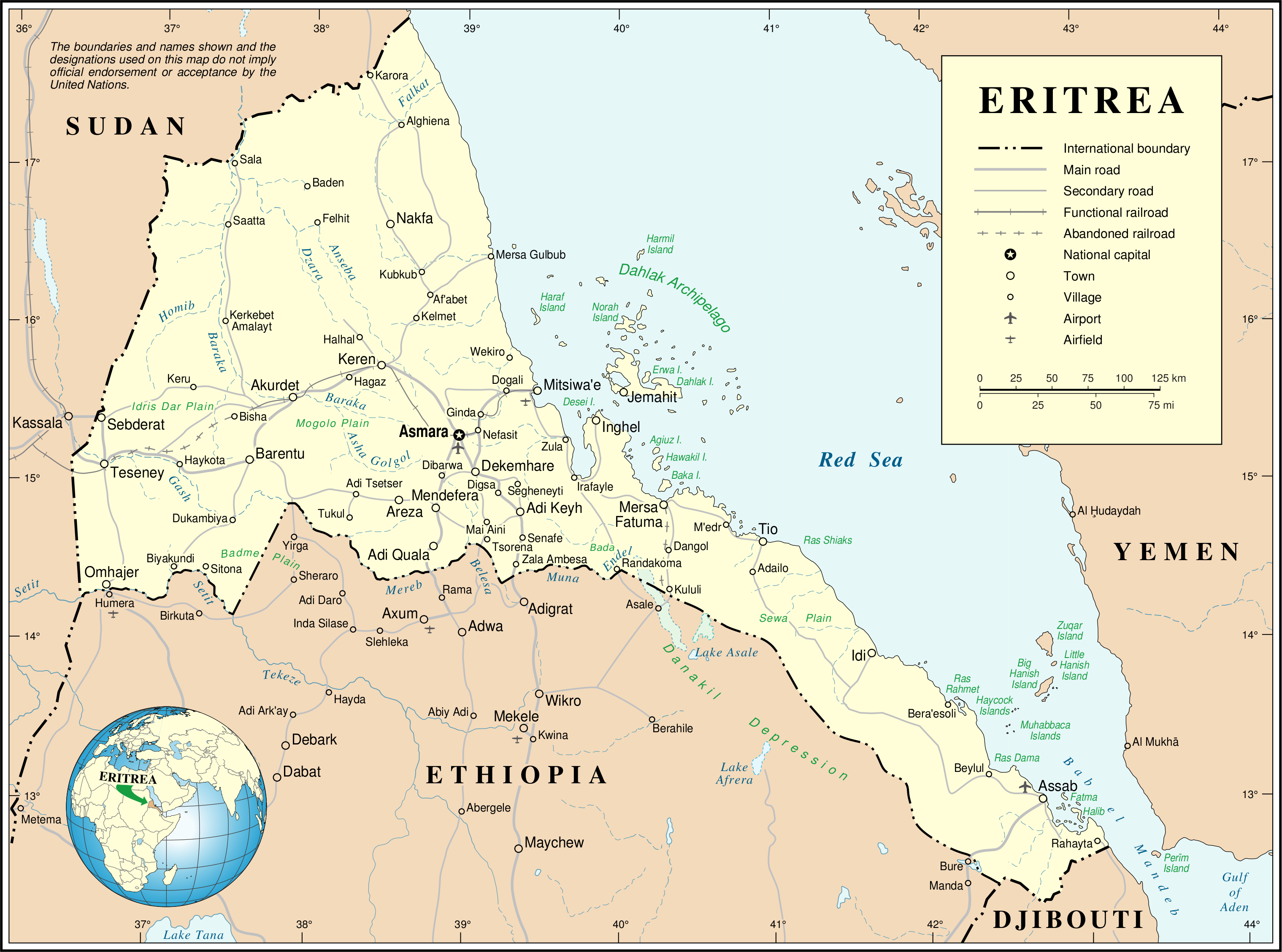
- Eritrea, showing Massawa (Mitsiwa'e) and Harmil Island to the north-east
Date	20–21 October 1940
Location	Red Sea, off Massawa, Italian East Africa 16°04′01″N 41°33′00″E
Result	British victory

Belligerents
United Kingdom; British India; New Zealand; Australia	Italy

Commanders and leaders
James Rivett-Carnac; J. S. M. Richardson; H. E. Horan	Costantino Borsini †; Adriano M. D. Adimari; Paolo Aloisi

Strength
1 light cruiser; 1 destroyer; 3 sloops; 2 minesweepers; Convoy BN 7 (32 ships)	4 destroyers; Shore battery on Harmil Island

Casualties and losses
3 wounded; 1 destroyer damaged; 1 tanker damaged	14 killed; 1 destroyer sunk
- Red Sea, west of the Dahlak Archipelago

The Attack on Convoy BN 7 (20–21 October 1940) was a naval engagement in the Red Sea during the Second World War between a British force defending convoyed merchant ships and a flotilla of Italian destroyers. The Italian attack failed, with only one tanker damaged. After a chase, the British destroyer HMS Kimberley torpedoed the destroyer Francesco Nullo which was beached on Harmil Island. Kimberley was hit, disabled by Italian shore batteries on the island and towed to safety by the cruiser HMS Leander.

Manoeuvring in two groups to increase the chance of intercepting the convoy had succeeded for the Italians but sacrificed the benefits of concentration against the escorts and a destroyer was lost for no result. The British command at Aden criticised the escorts (excepting Kimberley) for a lack of aggression, but leaving the convoy defenceless to chase ships at night and in misty weather would have been risky. The Italians made another fruitless sortie on 3 December, cancelled one in January 1941 after the destroyer Daniele Manin was damaged by a bomb and conducted an abortive sortie on 24 January.

== Background ==
=== Red Sea ===
The Red Sea is an area of high temperatures and humidity, its coasts vary from desert to high mountain ranges and navigation is fraught with danger from offshore reefs and false horizons caused by atmospheric refraction. From May to June 1939, French and British military officials met at Aden to devise a common strategy to retain control of the waters around Italian East Africa if Italy declared war. It was expected that Italy could close the Mediterranean to Allied traffic and that supplies to the Middle East would have to be transported via the Red Sea. Control of the Gulf of Aden, the Red Sea and the Gulf of Suez at the northern terminus and the maintenance of the bases at Aden and French Somaliland (Djibouti) was equally important but a withdrawal from French and British Somaliland had also to be contemplated.

The British-controlled Port Sudan lay on the west coast of the Red Sea, about halfway [600 nmi (1,100 km; 690 mi)] between Suez and the Bab-el-Mandeb Strait (باب المندب, Gate of Tears). The Italian port of Massawa in Eritrea was about 350 nmi (650 km; 400 mi) north and Aden about 100 nmi (190 km; 120 mi) east of the Bab-el-Mandeb. The ports along the coast of Italian Somaliland and the entrance to the Red Sea were to be blockaded (Operation Begum) to prevent the Italians from receiving supplies and reinforcements. Allied merchant ships in the Indian Ocean and the Red Sea were to proceed in escorted convoys. Naval ships were to sweep mines, patrol the Gulf of Aden and the Bab-el-Mandeb to isolate the Italian Red Sea Flotilla (Flottiglia del Mar Rosso) and protect Aden from sorties by Italian ships; the Italian naval bases in Eritrea were to be attacked.

=== Red Sea Force ===
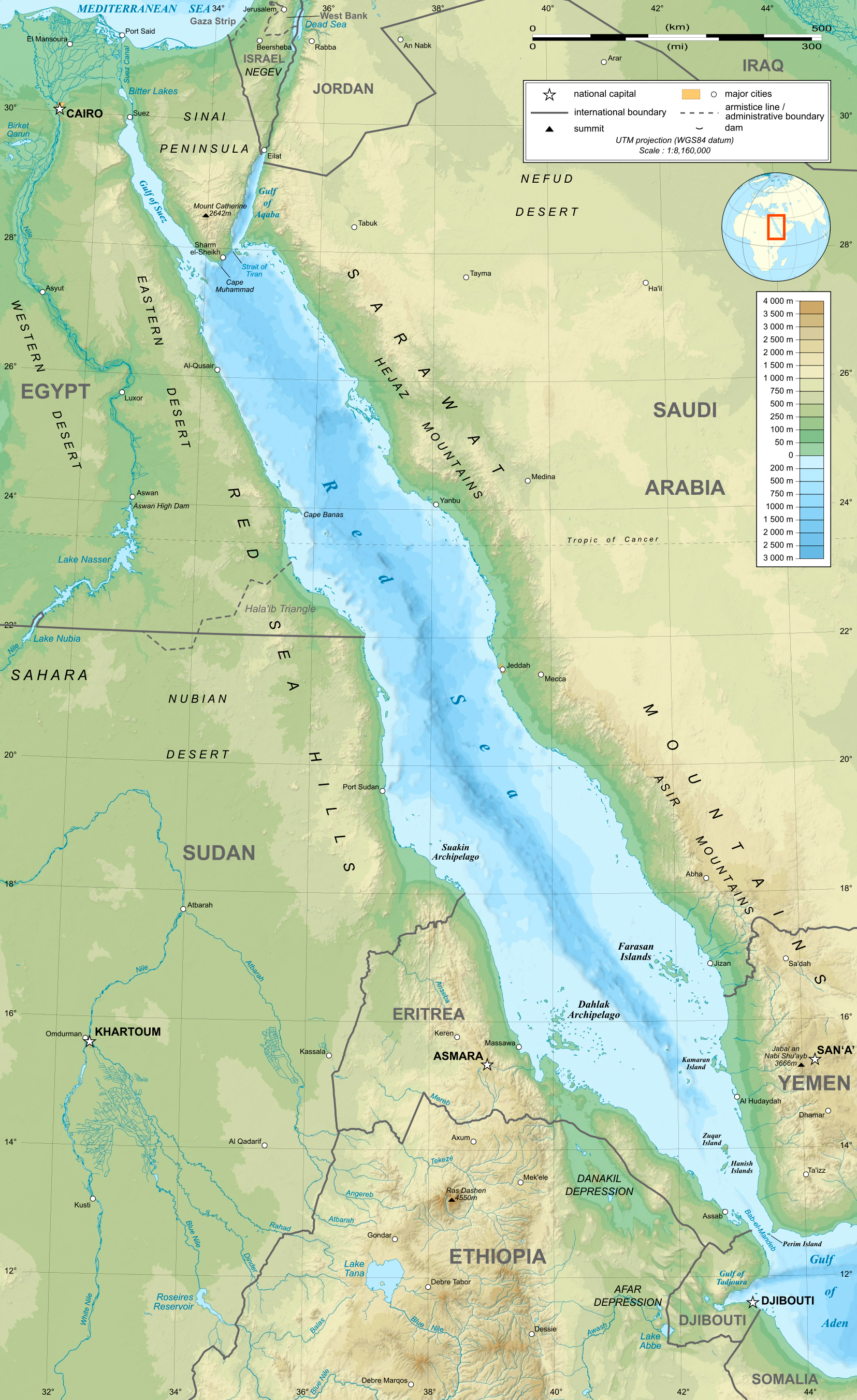
Topographic map of the Red Sea

In April 1940 the Royal Navy established the Red Sea Force with the light cruisers HMS Liverpool and HMAS Hobart (Senior Naval Officer Red Sea, Rear-Admiral Murray); HMS Leander (New Zealand Division) replaced Liverpool on 26 May. By September the Force comprised the cruisers Hobart, Leander, Caledon and the anti-aircraft cruiser Carlisle; the destroyers HMS Kimberley, Kingston and Kandahar; the sloops HMS Flamingo, Auckland, Shoreham and Grimsby; HMIS Clive, Indus and Hindustan; and HMAS Parramatta. Aden was the base for two minesweepers, two small Armed Merchant Cruisers and two armed trawlers. Ships attached temporarily included the light cruisers HMS Ceres and Colombo, the 8-inch cruisers HMS Dorsetshire and Shropshire.

=== Red Sea Flotilla ===
The Italian naval and air bases in East Africa were convenient for attacks on shipping in the Red Sea and the Indian Ocean. Massawa was the home port of the Red Sea Flotilla (Flottiglia del Mar Rosso) commanded by Rear-Admiral [Contrammiraglio] Mario Bonetti, from December 1940 to April 1941. Massawa had been fortified and lay behind numerous islands and reefs with mined approaches; there was a smaller base at Assab. The scout cruisers (esploratori, also Leone-class destroyers) Pantera and Leone (Commander Paolo Aloisi) had an unusually powerful armament of eight 4.7 in (120 mm) guns, in four turrets on the centre line. Only two turrets could aim fore and aft but the eight-gun broadside was unique for destroyers.

The class also carried two 40 mm pom-pom anti-aircraft guns, four 20 mm machine-guns, four 21.0 in (533 mm) torpedo tubes and 60 mines. The Sauro-class destroyers had an armament of four 4.7 in (120 mm) guns, two 40 mm pom-poms, two 13.2 mm machine-guns, six 53.3 cm (21.0 in) torpedo tubes and 52 mines. Once war was declared, the fuel stored for the Italian ships based at Massawa could only diminish under the British blockade. The accumulation of mechanical faults, fuel depletion and the enervating effect of the climate exercised severe constraints on the operations of the Red Sea Flotilla.

== Prelude ==
=== Red Sea convoys ===
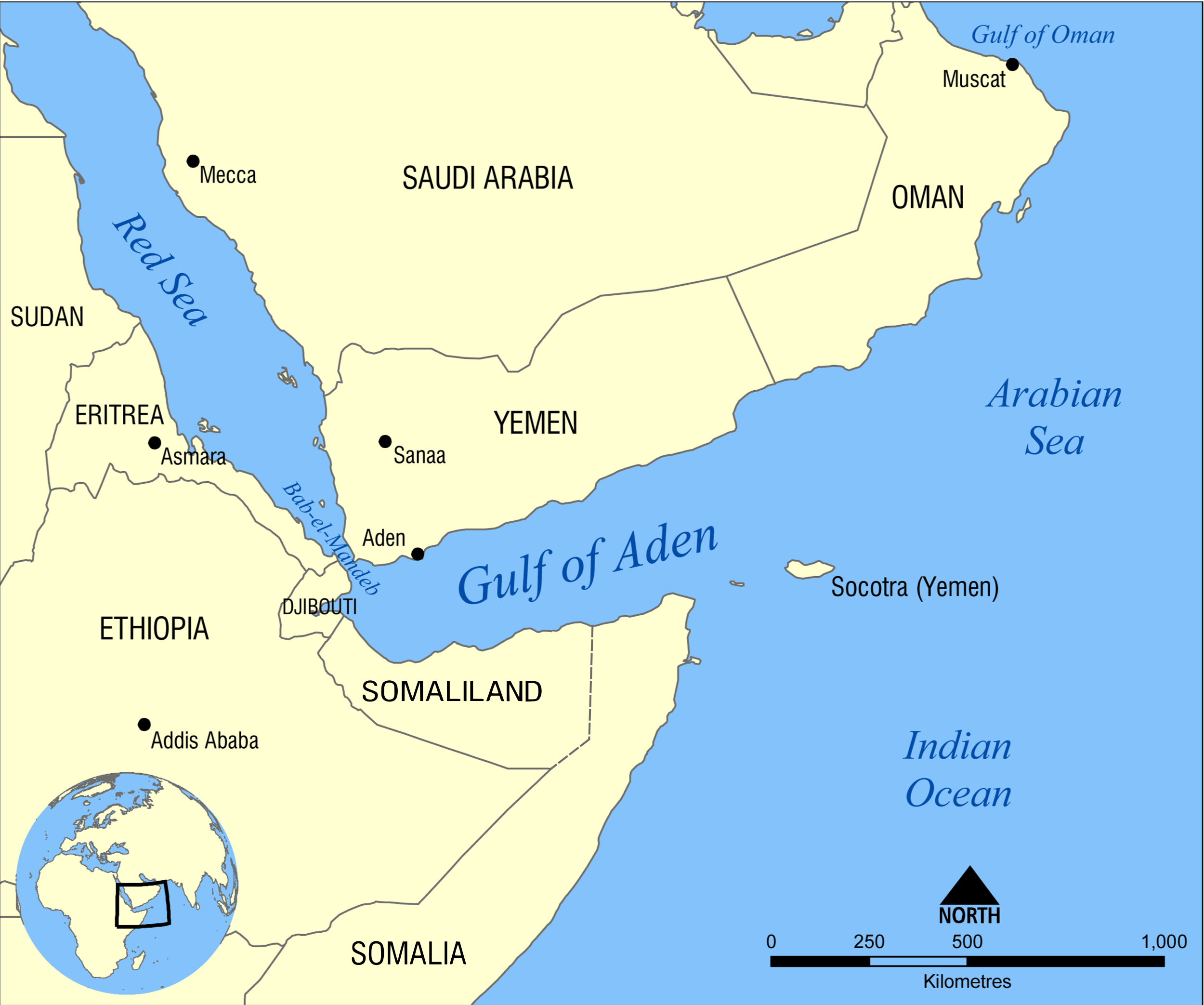
Gulf of Aden

In June four of the eight Italian submarines based at Massawa were lost. The Regia Aeronautica (Italian Royal Air Force) commenced operations over the Red Sea and on 11 June a Savoia-Marchetti SM.81 flew a reconnaissance sortie. On 16 June, the Italian submarine Galileo Galilei sank the Norwegian tanker James Stove (8,215 gross register tons [GRT]), sailing independently about 12 nmi (22 km; 14 mi) south of Aden. On 19 June, Hobart sent its Walrus amphibian to bomb an Italian wireless station on Centre Peak Island, between Massawa and the Arabian coast. On 2 July, Convoy BN 1, comprising six tankers and three freighters, assembled in the Gulf of Aden.

On 8 July, an SM.81 of 10° Squadriglia flew a long range reconnaissance sortie over southern Sudan and the Red Sea and was attacked by a Wellesley. The SM.81 was damaged and hit an island trying to force land, bounced into the air and flew on at wave top height, with the Wellesley flying above and to one side for its gunners to keep firing. After ten minutes the Italian aircraft hit the sea and shed its wings. (Note: Three survivors got into a life raft and the observer Sottotenente (Sub-Lieutenant) Goffredo Franchini, in command of the sortie, climbed onto one of the wings. Franchini realised that if he joined the others, the life raft would be swamped and ordered the crew to make for the island nearby without him. The men in the raft decided to make for Dahlak Island and collected birds' eggs before setting off. The three men arrived after two weeks, were rescued by local civilians and collected by a destroyer, reaching Massawa three weeks after being shot down.) From 26 to 31 July, Guglielmotti failed to find two Greek merchantmen and a sortie by the torpedo boats Cesare Battisti and Francesco Nullo came to nothing. Guglielmotti sortied from 21 to 25 August, Galileo Ferraris (25–31 August), Francesco Nullo and Sauro from 24 to 25 August and the destroyers Pantera and Tigre (28–29 August) failing to find ships, despite agent reports and sightings by air reconnaissance.

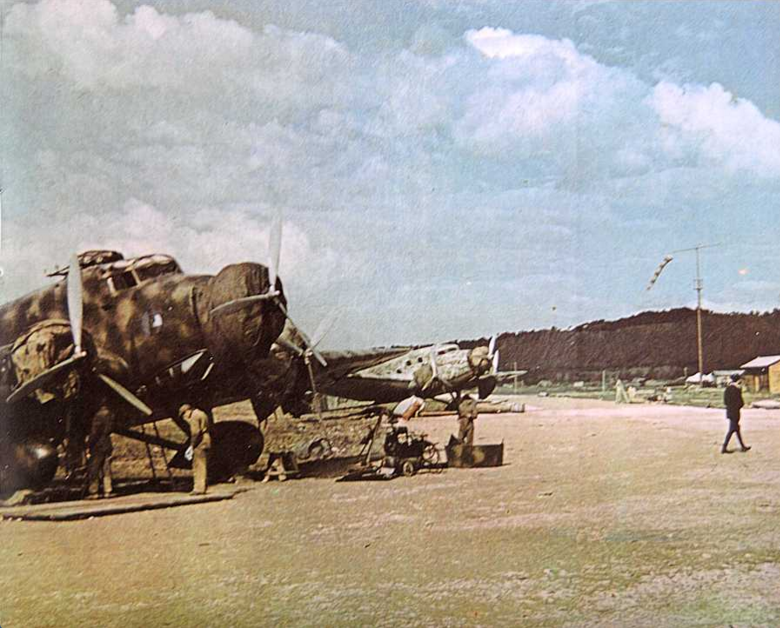
Photograph of SM.81 Pipistrello bomber-transport aircraft

On 4 September, Italian bombers attacked SS Velko, inflicted serious damage on it and on the next day, five SM.79s attacked Convoy BS 3A. A Blenheim IVF fighter on convoy patrol attacked the bombers and received damage by return-fire. On 6 September the convoy was attacked again by a SM.79. Convoy BN 4 was spotted by air reconnaissance and on the night of 5/6 September, Cesare Battisti, Daniele Manin and Nazario Sauro sailed. The destroyers Leone and Tigre followed on 6/7 September but the destroyers found nothing. The submarines Galileo Ferraris and Guglielmotti patrolling further to the north, also failed to find Convoy BN 4 but Guglielmotti torpedoed the Greek tanker Atlas (4,008 GRT) straggling behind the convoy south of the Farasan Islands.

Air reconnaissance also found Convoy BN 5 of 23 ships but Leone, Pantera, Cesare Battisti and Daniele Manin, with the submarines Archimede and Gugliemotti failed to find the convoy. MV Bhima (5,280 GRT) had straggled and was damaged in an Italian air attack, one man was killed; the ship was towed to Aden and beached for repairs. On 19 September five SM.79s attacked a convoy and outpaced two Gladiator fighters which tried to intercept them. On the next day, Italian bombers were driven off by Blenheim fighters. On 15 October, three SM.79 bombers were prevented from attacking another convoy by two Gladiator fighters and a Blenheim. Five days later, individual SM.79s attacked Convoy BN 7.

=== Convoy BN 7 ===
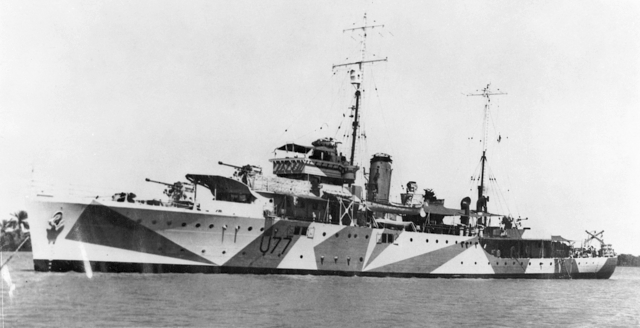
Australian sloop HMAS Yarra

Convoy BN 7 was northbound through the Red Sea and consisted of 32 British, Norwegian, French, Greek and Turkish merchant ships. The escort consisted of the light cruiser HMS Leander (Commander James Rivett-Carnac), the destroyer Kimberley (Commander J. S. M. Richardson), the Egret-class sloop Auckland, the Grimsby-class sloops HMAS Yarra and HMIS Indus and the Hunt-class minesweepers HMS Derby and Huntley. After joining the Red Sea Force, Yarra had escorted convoys in the Red Sea and intercepted blockade-running dhows. The convoy was nearing Perim, an island off the south-west coast of Yemen in the Bab-el-Mandeb, on the afternoon of 19 October.

An aircraft dropped four bombs close astern of one of the merchantmen. Leander and Auckland opened fire on the aircraft as it flew off to the west; shortly before dark, an undercarriage wheel of an Italian aircraft was picked up 15 nmi (28 km; 17 mi) south of the island. Next morning, Italian aircraft dropped four bombs, two of which fell ahead of the convoy and two bombs harmlessly astern of the French liner Felix Roussel, carrying New Zealand and Australian troops to Suez. At dusk Leander took station on the port beam of the convoy between it and the Italian base at Massawa, which flanked the line of advance; the convoy zig-zagged through the night.

== Battle ==
=== Italian sortie ===
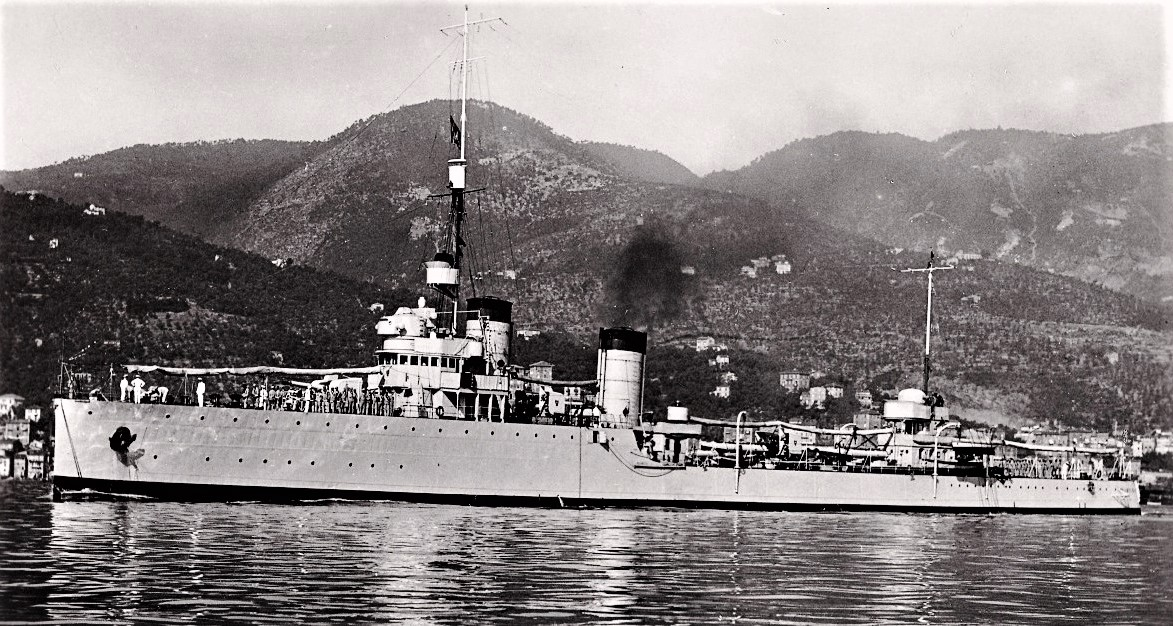
Italian destroyer Pantera

The Italian flotilla sailed on 20 October, the destroyers operating in pairs, Section I, comprised the faster Sauro (Commander Moretti degli Adimari) and Francesco Nullo (Lieutenant Commander Costantino Borsini). Section II, the slower, more heavily armed Pantera and Leone were to divert the convoy escort and then attack the convoy with torpedoes. At 21:15 the two sections separated and at 23:21, Pantera sighted smoke from the convoy. Pantera signalled Sauro and moved ahead of the convoy to intercept, with Leone following 875 yd (800 m) behind. The convoy was about 35 nmi (65 km; 40 mi) north-north-west of Jabal al-Tair Island when Leander sighted two patches of smoke bearing north.

Auckland reported two destroyers 4 nmi (7.4 km; 4.6 mi) off and Leander altered course to intercept, the captain assuming that they would run for home through the South Massawa Channel. The Italian destroyers were broad on the port bow of Yarra when Pantera fired two torpedoes at 23:31 and another pair at 23:34. Yarra avoided two torpedoes by turning towards them and combing their tracks. After a challenge from Auckland, Pantera fired over Yarra at the convoy, inflicting splinter damage to a lifeboat on the convoy commodore's ship, the tanker British Colonel. The fuel tank of the boat exploded, giving the impression to the Italians that two torpedoes had hit home. Auckland opened fire and the Italian ships separated and turned away at full speed, west-south-west, towards Massawa, firing their aft guns. Observers in Yarra thought that the leading enemy vessel was hit by their fourth or fifth salvo.

Sauro and Nullo had been manoeuvring to a more favourable position after receiving the sighting report from Pantera, turned towards the convoy and spotted Leander at 01:48 (21 October). Sauro fired a torpedo at Leander which missed and Leander opened fire but lost sight of Sauro after two minutes. Sauro made another torpedo attack at 02:07 and turned away towards Massawa. (Nullo was not able to attack after its rudder jammed for several minutes and it went round in circles, losing contact with Sauro.) Borsini ordered Nullo towards the Italian batteries on Harmil Island off Massawa. When the gunfire ceased, Leander altered course to north-west to intercept the ships at the South Massawa Channel (the Harmil Island Passage) and at 02:45, opened fire with 6-inch HE and star shells on a ship that was firing red and green tracer. The range was increasing and the ship was lost to sight after the first salvos.

Leander altered course westwards to bring all guns to bear if the ships were making for the South Massawa Channel. At 02:20 Leander spotted Nullo by searchlight and exchanged fire for about ten minutes at about 4,600 yd (2.3 nmi; 4.2 km), Leander scoring several hits which damaged Nullo's gyrocompass and gunnery director. At 02:51, Leander lost contact in the haze and ceased fire (having fired a hundred and twenty-nine 6-inch rounds). Nullo headed toward Harmil Island with Leander in pursuit and at 03:00, Leander challenged a destroyer which turned out to be Kimberley, also in pursuit. After five minutes, the cruiser altered course east to rejoin the convoy, since the Italian ship was drawing away at the rate of 7 kn (13 km/h; 8.1 mph) and the convoy would still be vulnerable to attack during a pursuit.

=== Action off Harmil Island ===
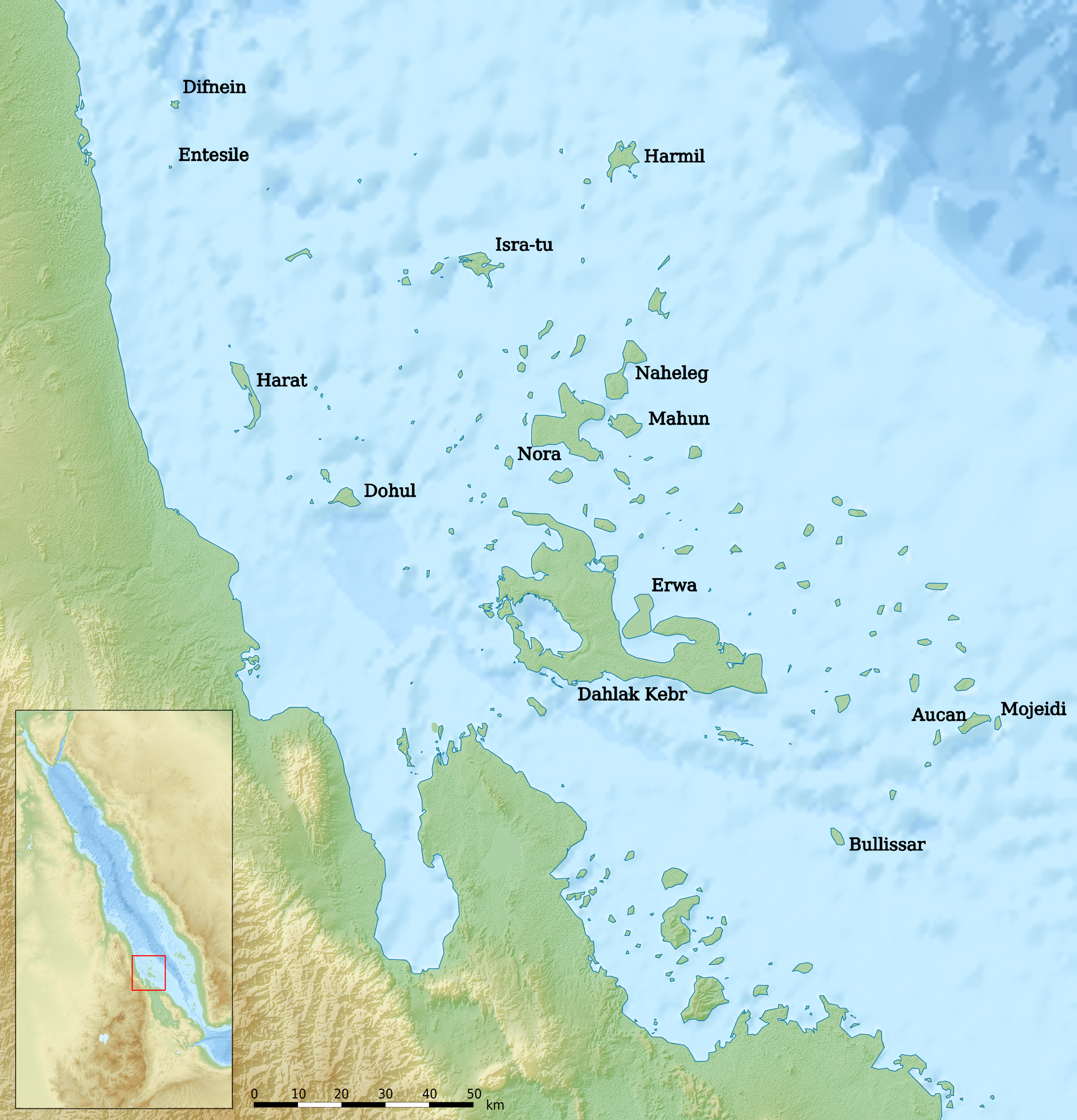
Harmil Island in the Dahlak Archipelago off Massawa

In the early hours of 21 October, Kimberley continued to sail at maximum speed and at 03:50 sighted smoke ahead, apparently from two ships retiring at high speed. At 05:40, off Harmil Island, lookouts on Kimberley and Nullo spotted each other at 7 nmi (13 km; 8.1 mi) distance. Borsini assumed that the ship was Sauro and when Kimberley opened fire at 05:53, Nullo was taken by surprise, not returning fire for four minutes. Kimberley closed the range to 5,000 yd (2.5 nmi; 4.6 km) and at 06:20, Nullo scraped a reef, which damaged a propeller and sprung a leak. As Nullo rounded Harmil Island at about 06:25, it was hit once in the forward engine room and once in the aft engine room.

Nullo lost all power; Borsini gave the order to abandon ship and steered towards Harmil Island. The upper works were hit by shell splinters and the crew abandoned-ship, while Borsini tried to run Nullo aground on the island. Nullo was then hit by the second of two torpedoes at 06:35, which broke it in two. (Borsini and his assistant declined to leave the ship and were drowned.) (Note: Borsini and his attendant Vincenzo Ciaravolo were awarded the Gold Medal by the Italian Navy, which then ordered that, captains were to abandon ship.) At 06:15 the four 120 mm guns on Harmil Island engaged Kimberley and hit the engine-room, wounding three men and holing the steam pipes. While adrift 10,000 yd (4.9 nmi; 9.1 km) from the shore battery, Kimberley silenced two of the guns and wounded four gunners with 45 HE shells from No. 3 mount.

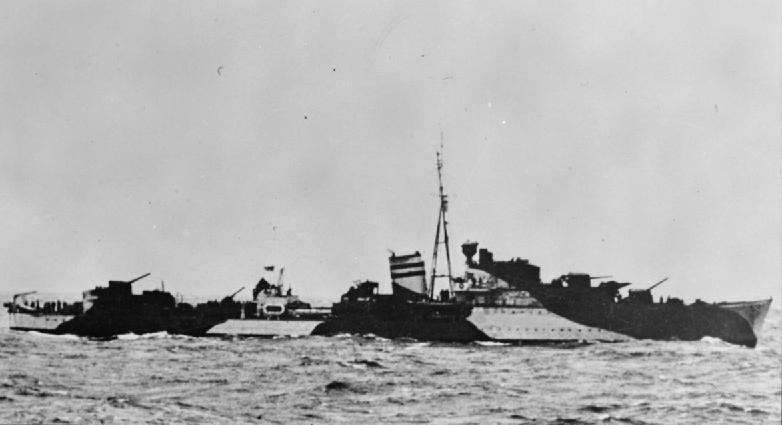
HMS Kimberley (photographed in 1942)

Kimberley managed to get under way, its speed reduced to 15 kn (28 km/h; 17 mph) and the shore battery ceased fire when Kimberley was 19,000 yd (9.4 nmi; 17 km) away. Kimberley had fired 596 rounds of semi-armour piercing and 97 High Explosive shells. Leander left the convoy and at 06:54 increased speed to 26 kn (48 km/h; 30 mph). By 07:34, Leander was making 28.7 kn (53.2 km/h; 33.0 mph) and soon after, Kimberley reported that it was steaming east at 15 kn (28 km/h; 17 mph) on one engine.

At 08:25, Leander was 16 nmi (30 km; 18 mi) east by north of the Harmil South beacon and slowed to 10 kn (19 km/h; 12 mph). Leander circled near Kimberley to keep freedom of manoeuvre, in case Italian bombers appeared. Kimberley had lost water in its boilers and Leander sent a boat with three shipwrights and an engine-room artificer; a wounded rating was transferred to the cruiser for medical attention. At about 10:00, Leander took Kimberley in tow. At 10:00 on 21 October, Leander opened fire on three aircraft at 13,000 ft (4,000 m), which bombed about 200 yd (180 m) ahead of the ship, two more bombs turning out to be duds. No damage was done and Leander and Kimberley re-joined Convoy BN 7 just after noon. (Note: As they passed Felix Roussel they were cheered by hundreds of the New Zealand soldiers on board. In the afternoon, Leander transferred the tow to Kingston which left the convoy with Kimberley next morning for Port Sudan. The southbound Convoy BS 7 with 20 ships, was met by the convoy escorts in the afternoon of 23 October and after an uneventful passage, dispersed east of Aden on 28 October.)

== Aftermath ==
=== Analysis ===
In August the British had run four BN (northbound) convoys and four southbound BS convoys, five in September and seven in October, the BN convoys comprising 86 ships and the BS convoys 72 ships. Despite agent reports and sightings by the Regia Aeronautica, Italian submarines and ships had frequently failed to make contact with the convoys; only six air attacks were achieved in October and none after 4 November. During the attack on Convoy BN 7, the British found that they were at a disadvantage in night fighting as they were temporarily blinded by the flash of their guns, while the Italian ships used flash-less cordite and had good tracer ammunition. The British convoy escorts were blamed for a lack of aggression, except for Kimberley, despite the danger of abandoning the convoy at night and in poor visibility. The Italians had managed to make two torpedo attacks as planned but to no effect; the division of the destroyers into two sections, after previous sorties had failed to find any ships, meant that neither section had the firepower to face the British escorts.

=== Casualties ===
Of the 120 crew of Nullo, Borsini declined to abandon ship and when his assistant, Seaman Vincenzo Ciaravolo, realised he jumped from his lifeboat to accompany his captain and both were drowned. Of the ship's company 12 men were killed and 106 were rescued by sailors of the Harmil Island coastal battery. Kimberley was out of action until 31 October, then returned to service capable of a reduced maximum speed, until fully repaired in the spring of 1941. After arrival at Suez, British Colonel remained there for repairs until 17 April 1941.

=== Subsequent operations ===
Later on 21 October, three Blenheim bombers of 45 Squadron bombed the wreck of Francesco Nullo. The Italians made another fruitless sortie on 3 December, cancelled one in January 1941 after Daniele Manin was damaged by a bomb and sortied again on 24 January, with no result.

== Orders of battle ==
Red Sea Force (formed April 1940)
Ship	Flag	Class	Notes
HMS Liverpool	Royal Navy	Town-class cruiser	
HMAS Hobart	Royal Australian Navy	Leander-class cruiser	
HMS Leander	Royal Navy	Leander-class cruiser	Replaced Liverpool 26 May 1940
HMS Caledon	Royal Navy	C-class cruiser	
HMS Carlisle	Royal Navy	C-class cruiser	Anti-aircraft cruiser
HMS Kandahar	Royal Navy	K-class destroyer	
HMS Kimberley	Royal Navy	K-class destroyer	
HMS Kingston	Royal Navy	K-class destroyer	
HMS Flamingo	Royal Navy	Black Swan-class sloop	
HMS Auckland	Royal Navy	Egret-class sloop	
HMIS Hindustan	Royal Indian Navy	Folkestone-class sloop	
HMS Grimsby	Royal Navy	Grimsby-class sloop	
HMIS Indus	Royal Indian Navy	Grimsby-class sloop	
HMAS Parramatta	Royal Australian Navy	Grimsby-class sloop	
HMS Shoreham	Royal Navy	Shoreham-class sloop	
HMIS Clive	Royal Indian Navy	Sloop	

=== Regia Marina ===
Destroyers
Ship	Flag	Class	Notes
3rd Destroyer Division
Cesare Battisti	Kingdom of Italy	Sauro	Bombed FAA, scuttled off Scio Aiba, 3 April 1941
Daniele Manin	Kingdom of Italy	Sauro	Bombed 7:45 a.m. 3 April 1941, capsized 20°20'N, 30°10'E (Note: Sank 100 nmi (190 km; 120 mi) north-east of Port Sudan)
Francesco Nullo	Kingdom of Italy	Sauro	Damaged Kimberley, destroyed RAF, 21 November 1940
Nazario Sauro	Kingdom of Italy	Sauro	Sunk off Jeddah 20°N, 30°E, Fleet Air Arm, 3 April 1941 (Note: Sunk by 813 and 824 Naval Air Squadrons FAA flying from Port Sudan, ship sank in 30 seconds.)
5th Destroyer Division
Leone	Kingdom of Italy	Leone	Ran aground 1 April 1941 16°09'N, 39°55'E scuttled
Pantera	Kingdom of Italy	Leone	Scuttled off Someina
Tigre	Kingdom of Italy	Leone	Scuttled, Someina 3 April 1941

== See also ==
- Red Sea Flotilla
- Costantino Borsini
- Attack on Convoy AN 14
- List of classes of British ships of World War II
