= Red Sea Flotilla =

Red Sea Flotilla (Flottiglia del mar rosso)
- Red Sea and Gulf of Aden, with modern boundaries
- Active: to June 1940
- Disbanded: April 1941
- Country: Italy
- Branch: Regia Marina
- Size: 7 destroyers; 8 submarines; 5 Motoscafo armato silurante (motor torpedo boat); 9 auxiliary ships

Commanders
- contrammiraglio: Carlo Balsamo di Specchia-Normandia (1939 – December 1940)
- contrammiraglio: Mario Bonetti (December 1940 – April 1941)

The Red Sea Flotilla (Flottiglia del mar rosso) was part of the Regia Marina (Italian Royal Navy) based at Massawa in the colony of Italian Eritrea, part of Italian East Africa. During the Second World War, the Red Sea Flotilla fought the East Indies Station of the Royal Navy from the Italian declaration of war on 10 June 1940 until the fall of Massawa on 8 April 1941.

The flotilla was isolated from the main Italian bases in the Mediterranean by distance and British dispositions. Without an overland route (via Sudan) or via the Suez Canal, supply was virtually impossible. The submarines in the flotilla suffered from faulty air conditioning that poisoned crews when submerged, causing several losses. Attempts to attack ships in the Red Sea and the Persian Gulf had meagre results and British intelligence successes caused the loss of several ships.

Rear Admiral Mario Bonetti ordered the harbour facilities to be denied to the British by the scuttling of more than thirty vessels in the harbour approaches. Bonetti directed the harbour workers to destroy their machine tools, two floating dry docks and a floating crane. The capture of Massawa and other Italian ports in the region brought the Flottiglia del mar rosso to an end in April 1941.

== Background ==
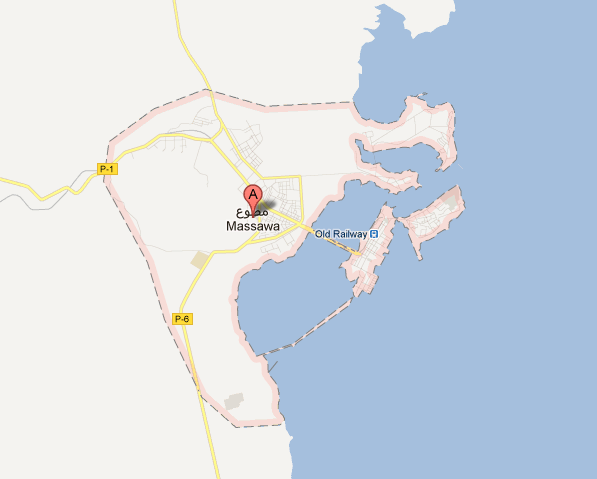
Diagram of Massawa and its harbours

After the Flotta d'evasione (evasion fleet) intended for the Indian Ocean, based in the ports of Italian Somaliland proved to be too expensive, Rear Admiral Carlo Balsamo di Specchia-Normandia, the commander of the East African naval squadron, based a smaller force at Massawa. On 10 June 1940, the Red Sea Flotilla had seven destroyers in two squadrons, a squadron of five MAS (Motoscafo Armato Silurante motor torpedo boats) and eight submarines in two squadrons. The main base was at Massawa, with other bases at Assab (also in Eritrea) and Kismayu, in southern Italian Somaliland. The Red Sea Flotilla would have to operate cautiously because of its finite stock of fuel and ammunition.

The base at Massawa and the smaller base at Assab on the Eritrean coast, was convenient for attacks on convoys sailing from the Gulf of Aden through the Red Sea to the Suez Canal, which became much more important after the Mediterranean was closed to Allied merchant ships, forcing them to sail around the Cape of Good Hope. A strategy of a fleet-in-being and the denial of the Red Sea to British shipping was the only practical strategy open to the Italians, using submarines offensively for a war of six months' duration. Because of the Flotilla, the US government declared the Red Sea a war zone and out of bounds to American ships, depriving the British of an important source of tonnage to supply the British forces in Egypt.

== 1940 ==
=== Early operations ===
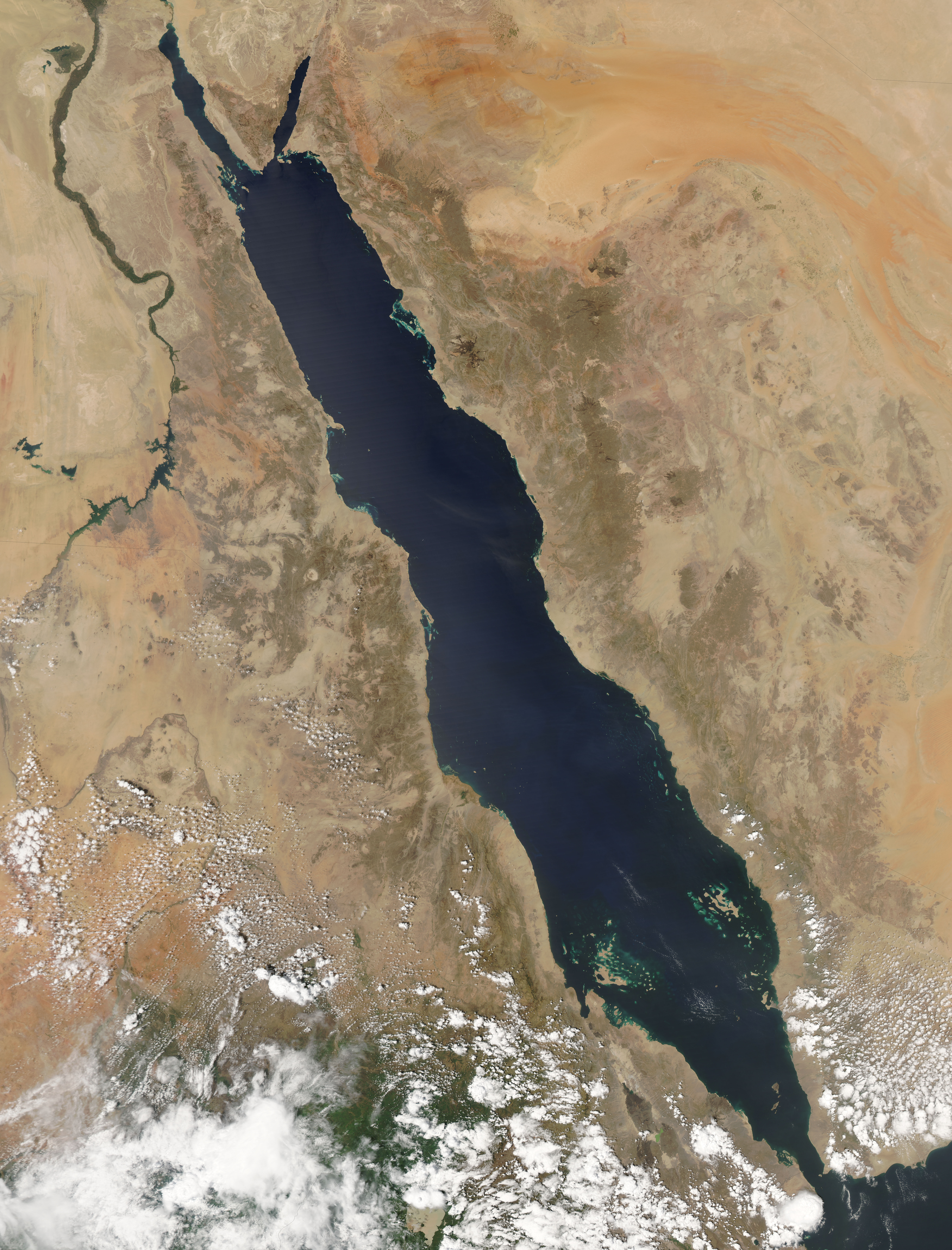
Satellite photograph of the Red Sea

Italy declared war on 10 June 1940 and the Flotilla tried to attack Royal Navy ships and Allied convoys from Massawa but the British had suspended sailings to the Red Sea on 24 May 1940. On 7 June, the Azio-class minelayer Ostia laid 470 mines in eight barrages and the destroyer Pantera, laid two barrages with 110 mines off Assab. Leakage of chloromethane refrigerants into the Italian submarines while submerged caused central nervous system poisoning; Macallé ran aground while the crew was incapacitated by the gas and was wrecked on 15 June. (Note: Chloromethane was a cheaper substitute for freon which was tested under conditions found to be unrealistic once hostilities began.) The next day, Galileo Galilei sank the Norwegian freighter James Stove (8,215 GRT) off Djibouti. On 19 June, when the submarine engaged the armed trawler Moonstone, all the officers except a midshipman were killed in two shell explosions and the vessel was captured, along with its operational orders and taken to Aden on the same day.

The British sent the sloop HMS Falmouth to find Galvani in the Persian Gulf, where it had sunk the sloop HMIS Pathan. Galvani was sunk on 24 June and Torricelli, en route to take over from Galileo Ferraris, after another chloromethane poisoning incident off Djibouti, was damaged by British ships on 21 June and forced to turn back. Torricelli was spotted on 23 June near Massawa by the destroyers HMS Kandahar, Khartoum, Kingston and the Shoreham-class sloop HMS Shoreham, aided by aircraft from Aden. Shoreham was damaged by Torricelli before it was sunk and Khartoum was sunk soon afterwards by an internal explosion. Archimede, Guglielmotti and Perla sailed from 19 to 21 June, Perla running aground on 26 June and being severely damaged on a shoal, then recovered.

From 26 to 31 July, Guglielmotti searched and failed to find two Greek ships heading south from Suez. On an offensive sweep, the torpedo boats Cesare Battisti and Francesco Nullo also found nothing. From 21 to 25 August, Guglielmotti and Ferraris, the torpedo boats Nullo and Nazario Sauro from 24 to 25 August, Battisti and Daniele Manin from 30 to 31 August, Pantera and Tigre from 28 to 29 August searched for ships reported by spies and reconnaissance aircraft, with no result. On the night of 5/6 September, Battisti, Manin and Sauro and over the night of 6/7 September, Leone and Tigre with Battisti and Sauro tried to intercept Convoy BN 4, that had been spotted by air reconnaissance but failed to find it; Ferraris and Guglielmotti, further to the north, also failed to make contact but Guglielmotti sank the Greek tanker Atlas (4,009 GRT) on 6 September at 15°50'N, 41°50'E. From 19 to 21 September, Leone and Pantera, Battisti and Manin with the submarines Archimede and Guglielmotti, searched for Convoy BN 5 but failed to find it; Bhima (5,280 GRT) was bombed, ran aground and towed back to Aden.

=== Attack on Convoy BN 7 ===
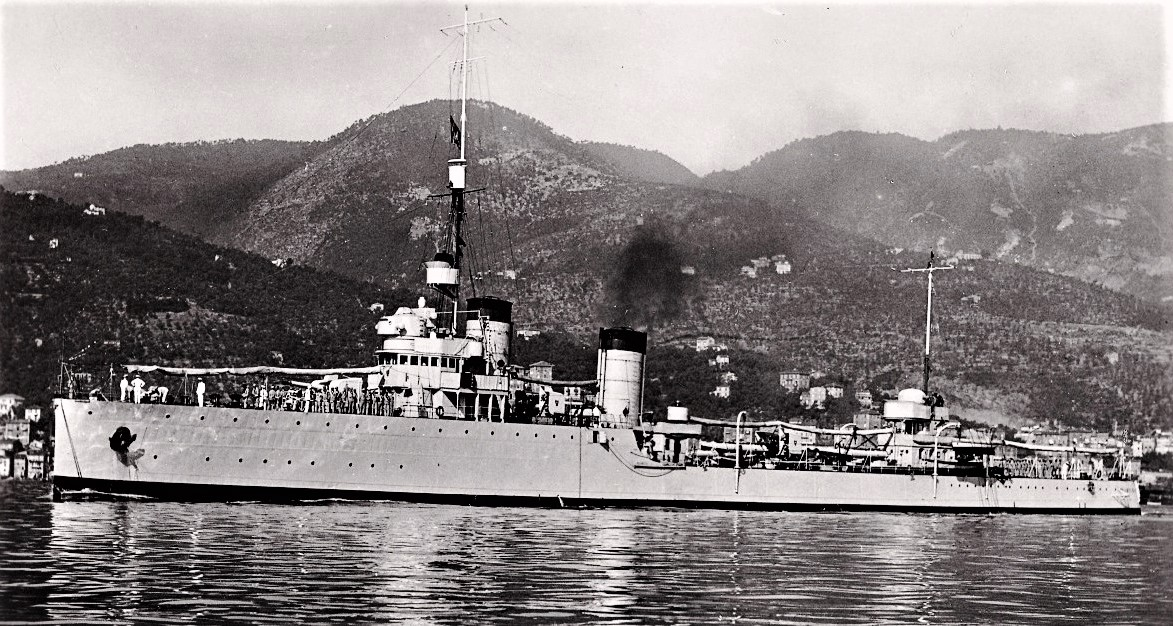
Italian destroyer Pantera

The Italian destroyers sailed on 20 October, the destroyers operating in pairs, Section I comprising the faster Sauro (Commander Moretti degli Adimari) and Francesco Nullo (Lieutenant Commander Costantino Borsini). Section II, the slower, better armed Pantera and Leone were to divert the escorts and then attack the convoy with torpedoes. The convoy was about 35 nmi (65 km; 40 mi) north-north-west of Jabal al-Tair Island at 02:19 on 21 October, when the New Zealand cruiser, Leander, sighted two patches of smoke bearing north. Pantera fired over Yarra at the convoy: shell splinters struck a shipboard boat on the convoy commodore's ship, the tanker British Colonel. The fuel reservoir of the small craft exploded, giving the impression to the Italians that two torpedoes had found their mark. Auckland opened fire and the Italian ships separated and turned away at full speed west-south-west, towards Massawa, firing their aft guns. Pantera fired two torpedoes at 23:31 and another pair at 23:34. Observers in Yarra thought that the leading enemy vessel was hit by their fourth or fifth salvo.

Sauro fired a torpedo at Leander which missed and made another ineffective torpedo attack at 02:07. Nullo was not able to attack after its rudder jammed for several minutes and it went round in circles, losing contact with Sauro. Borsini ordered Nullo towards the Italian batteries on Harmil, an island off Massawa. When the gunfire ceased, Leander altered course to the north-west to intercept the ships at the South Massawa Channel (the Harmil Passage) and at 02:45, opened fire; the range was increasing and the ship was lost to sight after the first salvos. At 02:20 Leander damaged Nullo's gyrocompass and gunnery director then lost contact in the haze. Nullo headed toward Harmil with Leander in pursuit and at 03:00, Leander challenged a destroyer which turned out to be Kimberley, also in pursuit. After five minutes, the cruiser altered course east to rejoin the convoy, since the Italian ship was drawing away at the rate of 7 kn (13 km/h; 8.1 mph) and the convoy was still vulnerable.

==== Action off Harmil ====
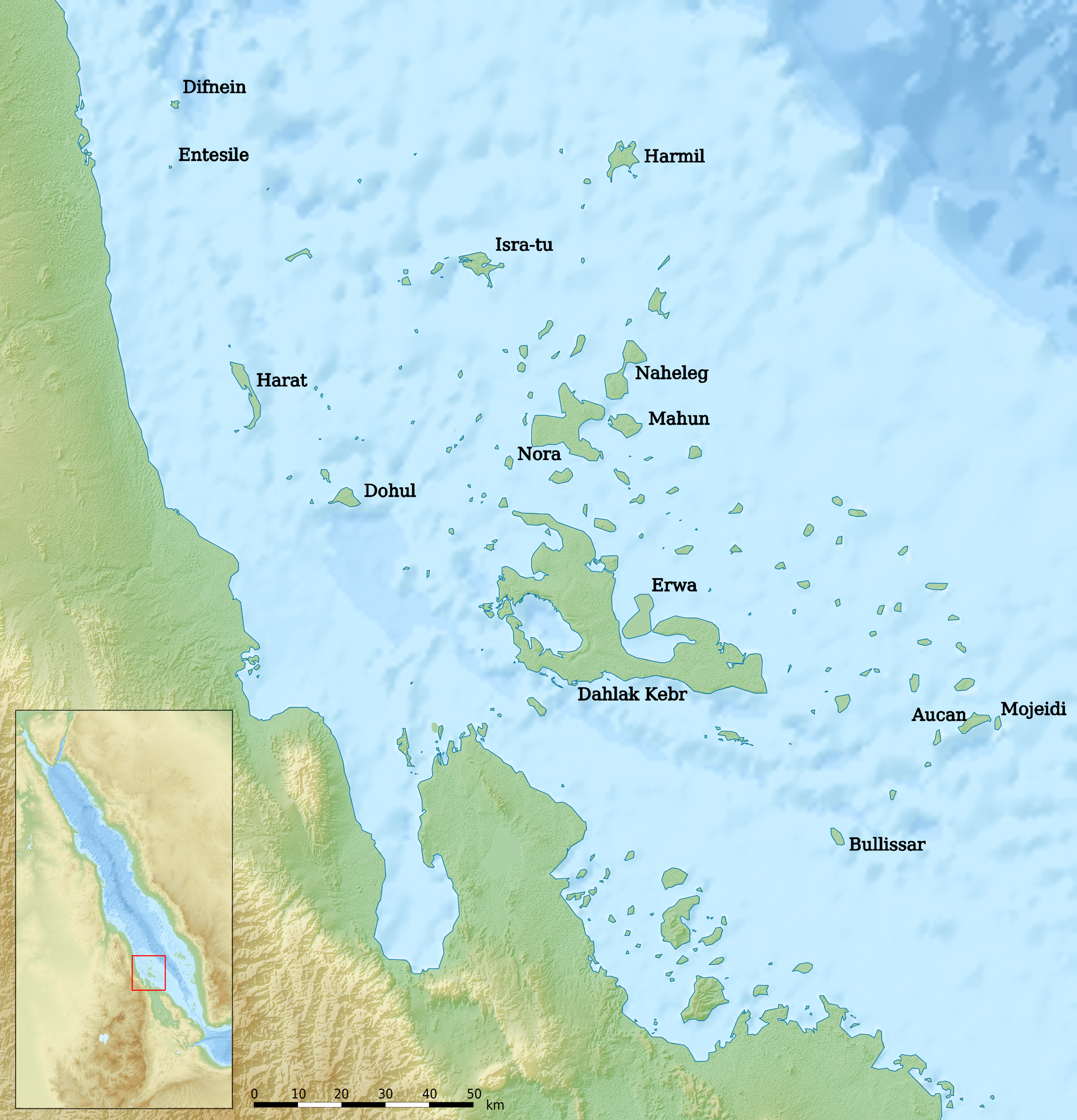
Harmil Island in the Dahlak Archipelago off Massawa

At 05:40, off Harmil, lookouts on Kimberley and Nullo spotted each other at 7 nmi (13 km; 8.1 mi). When Kimberley opened fire at 05:53, Nullo was taken by surprise, having mistakenly identified the British ship as Italian. Kimberley closed to 5,000 yd (2.5 nmi; 4.6 km) and at 06:20, Nullo scraped a reef, damaging a propeller and springing a leak. As Nullo rounded Harmil at about 06:25, it was hit several times. Nullo lost all power and Borsini gave the order to abandon ship, trying to run Nullo aground on Harmil. Nullo was then hit by a torpedo at 06:35, breaking in two.

At 06:15 the four naval guns on Harmil engaged Kimberley and hit it in the engine-room. While adrift 10,000 yd (4.9 nmi; 9.1 km) from the shore battery, Kimberley silenced two of the guns. Kimberley managed to get under way, its speed reduced to 15 kn (28 km/h; 17 mph) and the shore battery ceased fire when Kimberley was 19,000 yd (9.4 nmi; 17 km) distant. Leander left the convoy and at 06:54 increased speed to 26 kn (48 km/h; 30 mph). At about 10:00, Leander arrived and took Kimberley in tow.

=== December 1940 ===
From 3 to 5 December, Tigre, Leone, Manin and Sauro sortied with Ferraris in another abortive attempt to find a convoy. From 12 to 22 December, Archimede conducted two more sorties with no result and from 23 to 30 December Ferraris lay off Port Sudan.

== 1941 ==
=== Attack on Convoy BN 14 ===
On the night of 2/3 February 1941, the Italian destroyers Pantera, Tigre and Sauro sailed from Massawa to intercept Convoy BN 14, consisting of 39 merchant ships, escorted by the cruiser HMS Caledon, the destroyer Kingston and the sloops HMIS Indus and Shoreham. Sauro sighted the convoy, got off a sighting report and fired three torpedoes, then fired again at a ship seen in a cloud of smoke, before turning away at high speed. The two other ships did not receive the sighting report from Sauro but ten minutes later, Pantera saw the ships and fired torpedoes, hearing explosions and claiming probables on two merchantmen; Tigre failed to find the convoy. In the South Massawa Channel, Sauro ran into Kingston but had no torpedoes left. Fearful that the British were trying to spring ambush, the other Italian ships converged on Sauro and called by wireless for air cover at dawn, reaching port unharmed. Local Italian press reports claimed that two ships had been hit but this report was mistaken.

=== Operation Composition ===
On 14 February, in Operation Composition, 14 Albacore bombers from HMS Formidable attacked Massawa, sinking Moncaliere (5,723 GRT) and damaging other ships and freighters. On 21 February another seven Albacores dive-bombed the ships.

=== Action of 27 February 1941 ===
Ramb I (3,667 GRT) (Lieutenant commander Alfredo Bonezzi) was a refrigerated merchant ship (reefer) built for the Regia Azienda Monopolio delle Banane (RAMB, the Royal Banana Monopoly Company) in 1933. The ship was adapted for naval service as an armed merchant cruiser. Ramb I had departed Suez on 10 June 1940 for Massawa, from where the ship made short cruises along the coast of Eritrea but was mainly used for anti-aircraft defence of the port. In January 1941, the colonial ship Eritrea, the auxiliary cruisers, Ramb I and Ramb II, were to operate as commerce raiders. As British troops neared the port, Ramb I and Coburg (7,400 GRT), a German freighter, escaped from Massawa on the night of 20/21 February 1941 and passed into the Gulf of Aden. At 10:37 a.m., on 27 February, west of the Maldives, the New Zealand cruiser HMS Leander sighted a merchant resembling an Italian Ramb-class fruit carrier (Ramb I). Soon after 11:15 a.m. the ship hoisted the Italian merchant flag and trained its guns on Leander.

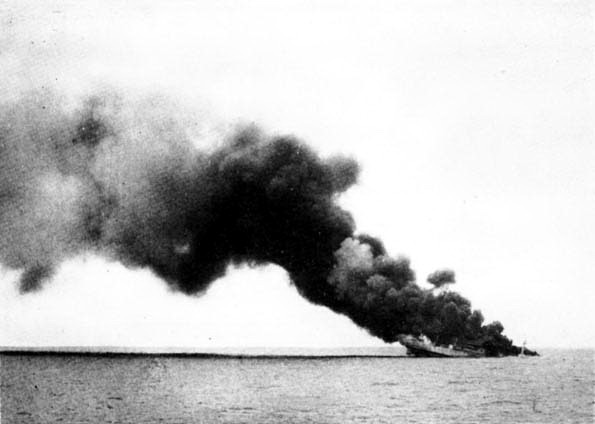
Ramb I on fire and sinking

The cruiser was broad on the beam of Ramb I and at 3,000 yd (1.5 nmi; 1.7 mi; 2.7 km) was an easy target for its guns and torpedoes. At 11:53 a.m., the Italian ship opened fire and thirty seconds later, Leander replied. The Italian fire was inaccurate and it was estimated that only about three shells were fired from each gun. Leander fired five salvos in a minute and hit the ship several times. A fire spread and an Italian officer in the water called out to a boarding party that they should not approach the ship, as it was burning and laden with ammunition. The boarding party laid off and as the fire spread, a big explosion before the bridge shot flames and smoke high into the sky, the ship settling bow first. As the fire burned, there was another explosion and five minutes later the ship sank under a cloud of black smoke. Leander recovered the boarding party and the Italian lifeboats, while edging away.

=== March 1941 ===
On 1 March five Albacores raided Massawa again but caused little damage. As the Italians depleted their fuel at Massawa, the offensive capability of the Red Sea Flotilla declined and it returned to a strategy of a fleet-in-being. On 23 March the German Oder (8,516 GRT) and the Italian India (6,366 GRT) sailed from Massawa but Oder was intercepted by Shoreham at the Bab-el-Mandeb Strait and scuttled; India docked at Assab. On 29 March Bertram Rickmers (4,188 GRT) sailed and was scuttled on 1 April when intercepted by Kandahar. Piave tried to break the blockade on 30 March and got as far as Assab and Lichtenfels sailed on 1 April but was turned back. On 31 March 1941, Pantera, Tigre and Leone, attempted a night attack on Suez but Leone ran aground off Massawa and had to be scuttled by gunfire, the delay causing the operation to be cancelled. The two remaining ships joined Sauro, Battisti and Daniele Manin on a final raid against Port Sudan on 2 April. Engine trouble kept Battisti in port and it was scuttled off the coat of Arabia on 3 April. The Italian ships were spotted by aircraft about 10 nmi (19 km; 12 mi) off the port and came under attack from the Swordfish bombers of HMS Eagle flying from the Port Sudan airfield that sank Manin and Sauro. Pantera and Tigre were scuttled on the Arabian coast.

=== Massawa, April 1941 ===
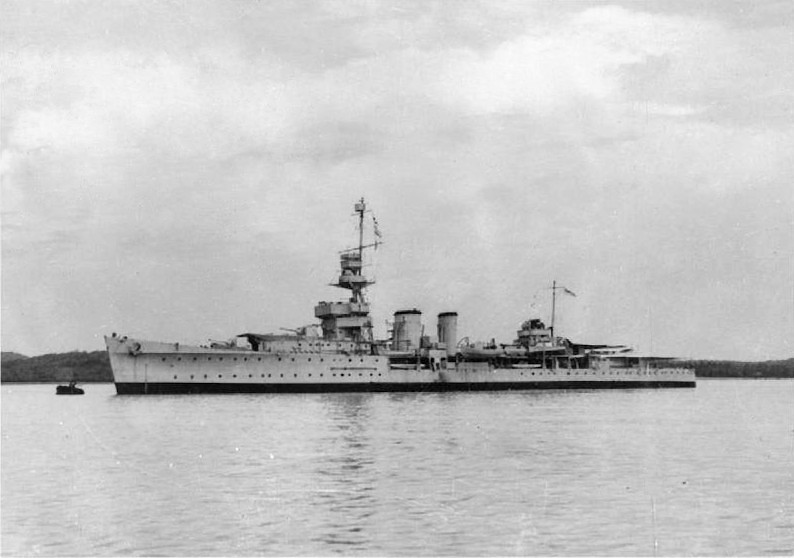
HMS Capetown was disabled by the motor torpedo boat MAS 213

The defenders of Massawa managed to resist several attacks but the main British effort began on 6 April. The light cruiser HMS Capetown was torpedoed by the motor torpedo boat MAS 213 off Massawa and was towed to Port Sudan by the sloop HMAS Parramatta for repairs. Attacks on land, combined with air and sea bombardments led the defences to crumble by 8 April. MAS 213, Orsini, MAS 204, 206, 210 and 216 and other ships were scuttled as the British troops entered the town. More than thirty vessels, including eleven Italian and six German, were scuttled in the harbour approaches, including large commercial ships, smaller coastal steamers, tugs and several naval vessels to a total of 89,870 GRT. The Italian harbour workers were to destroy their machine tools, two floating dry docks and a floating crane. The four remaining submarines were ordered to join the BETASOM flotilla at Bordeaux and evaded British attempts to intercept them.

On 8 April Massawa fell, five ships were sunk at Harmil (38,125 GRT) where two ships bombed earlier lay and three ships of 23,765 GRT were sunk at Assab. British efforts to bring the harbour back to service were frustrated by the extreme heat and humidity. Commander Joseph Stenhouse was able to re-float one oil tanker before he was killed at sea. On 11 April, President Roosevelt announced that the Red Sea and the Gulf of Aden were no longer war zones, allowing US ships to sail in them. A British civilian contractor was hired but he and his team failed to float any scuttled vessels. Edward Ellsberg, a commander in the U.S. Navy arrived in April 1942 and began systematically to restore the harbour facilities. His staff repaired the largest dry dock and pieced together enough machine tool parts to restore machinist operations. By August 1942, after re-floating several ships, Ellsberg opened access to the harbour sufficiently to enable British warships such as HMS Dido (19 August 1942) to be dry-docked and serviced. Assab, the last Italian-held port on the Red Sea, was attacked in Operation Chronometer on 10 June and occupied.

== Regia Marina order of battle ==
=== Destroyers ===
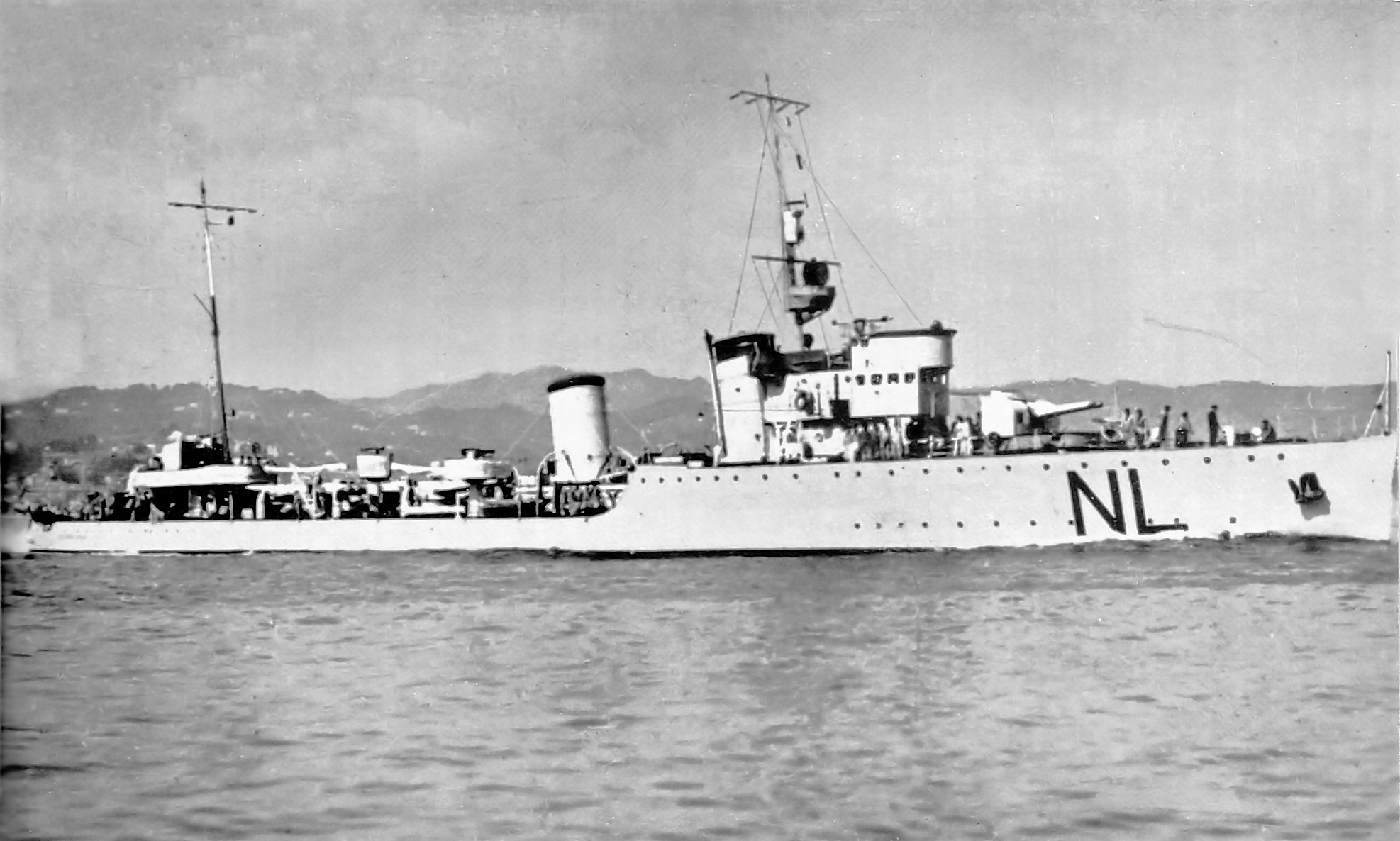
The Italian destroyer Francesco Nullo

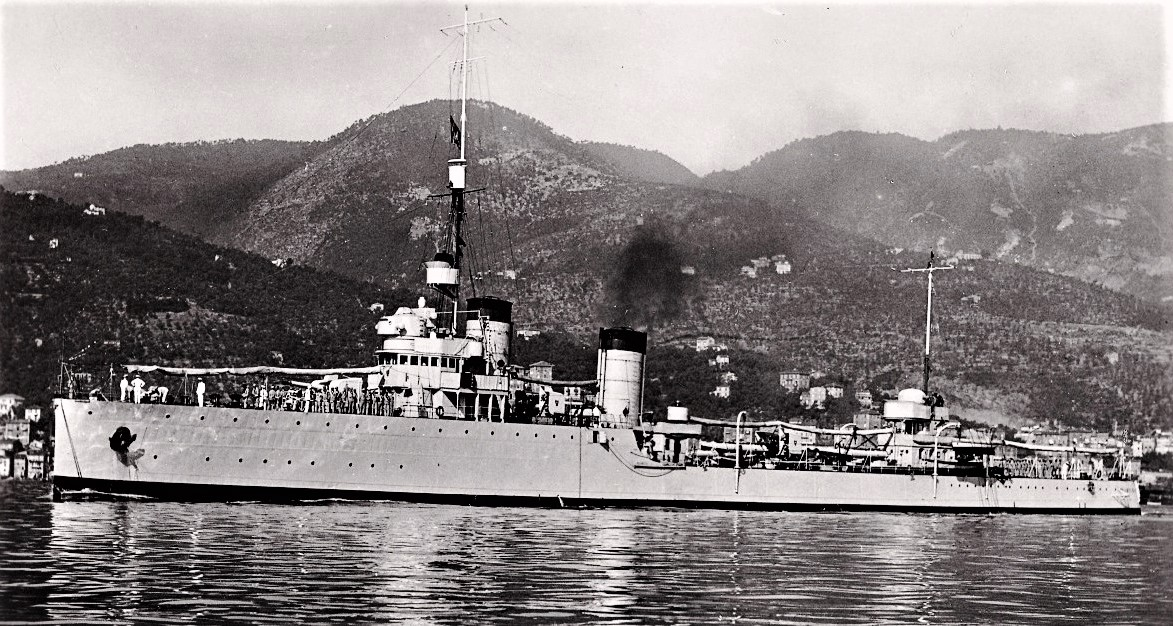
The Italian destroyer Pantera in 1935

3rd and 5th Destroyer divisions
Ship	Flag	Class	Div	Notes
Francesco Nullo	Kingdom of Italy	Sauro	3rd	Damaged Kimberley, destroyed RAF, 21 November 1940, 16°28′N, 40°13′E
Nazario Sauro	Kingdom of Italy	Sauro	3rd	Sunk off Jeddah 20°N, 30°E, Fleet Air Arm, 3 April 1941 (Note: Sunk by 813 and 824 Naval Air Squadrons FAA flying from Port Sudan, ship sank in 30 seconds.)
Cesare Battisti	Kingdom of Italy	Sauro	3rd	Bombed FAA, scuttled off Scio Aiba, 3 April 1941
Daniele Manin	Kingdom of Italy	Sauro	3rd	Bombed 7:45 a.m. 3 April 1941, capsized 20°20'N, 30°10'E (Note: Sank 100 nmi (190 km; 120 mi) north-east of Port Sudan)
Pantera	Kingdom of Italy	Leone	5th	Scuttled off Someina
Tigre	Kingdom of Italy	Leone	5th	Scuttled, Someina 3 April 1941
Leone	Kingdom of Italy	Leone	5th	Ran aground 1 April 1941 16°09'N, 39°55'E scuttled

=== MAS (Motor torpedo boats) ===
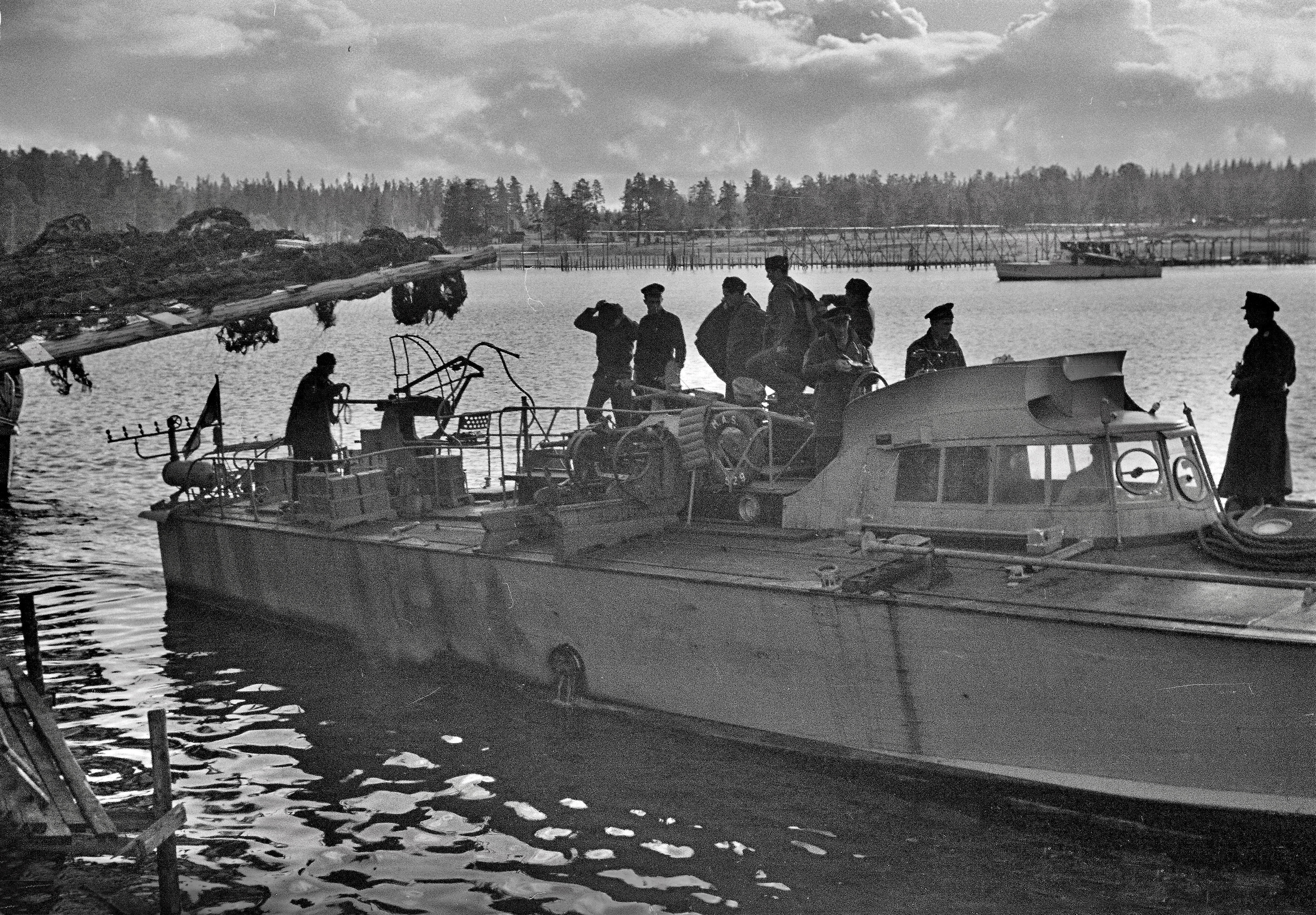
MAS leaves its moorings

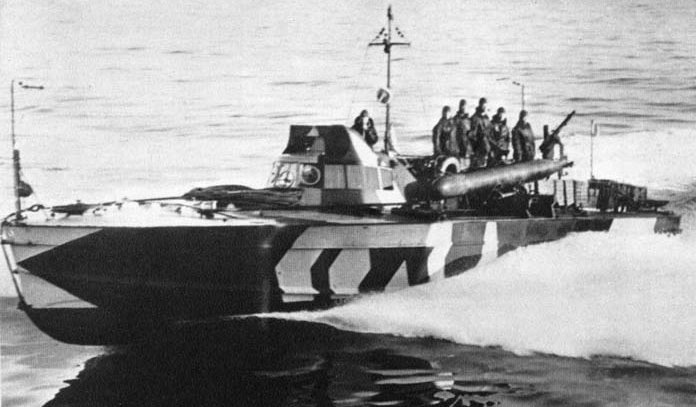
MAS at speed

21st MAS (Motoscafo armato silurante) Squadron
Boat	Year	Flag	Class	Notes
MAS 204	1918	Kingdom of Italy	Baglietto A	Scuttled Massawa, 8 April 1941
MAS 206	1918	Kingdom of Italy	Baglietto A	Scuttled Massawa, 8 April 1941
MAS 210	1918	Kingdom of Italy	Baglietto A	Scuttled Massawa, 8 April 1941
MAS 213	1918	Kingdom of Italy	Baglietto A	Scuttled Massawa, 8 April 1941
MAS 216	1918	Kingdom of Italy	Baglietto A	Scuttled Massawa, 8 April 1941

=== VIII Submarine Group ===
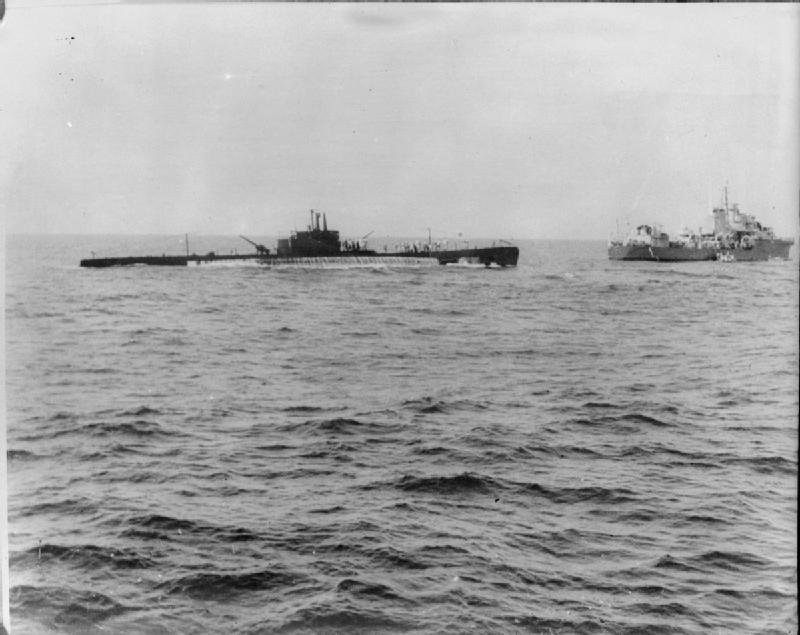
Galileo Galilei towed by HMS Kandahar

Adua-class submarine

81st and 82nd Submarine squadrons
Name	Flag	Class	Notes
Guglielmotti	Kingdom of Italy	Brin	Arrived Bordeaux, 6 May 1941
Galileo Ferraris	Kingdom of Italy	Archimede	Arrived Bordeaux 9 May 1941
Galileo Galilei	Kingdom of Italy	Archimede	Sank James Stove (8,215 GRT) captured by HMS Moonstone, 19 June 1940
Galvani	Kingdom of Italy	Brin	Sank HMIS Pathan, sunk 23 June 1940 off Persian Gulf by HMS Falmouth
Perla	Kingdom of Italy	Perla	Arrived Bordeaux 20 May 1941
Macallé	Kingdom of Italy	Adua	Ran aground and lost 15 June 1940
Archimede	Kingdom of Italy	Brin	Arrived Bordeaux, 7 May 1941
Torricelli	Kingdom of Italy	Brin	Sunk Perim, 23 June 1940, by HMS Kandahar, Khartoum, Kingston, Shoreham

=== Other naval vessels ===
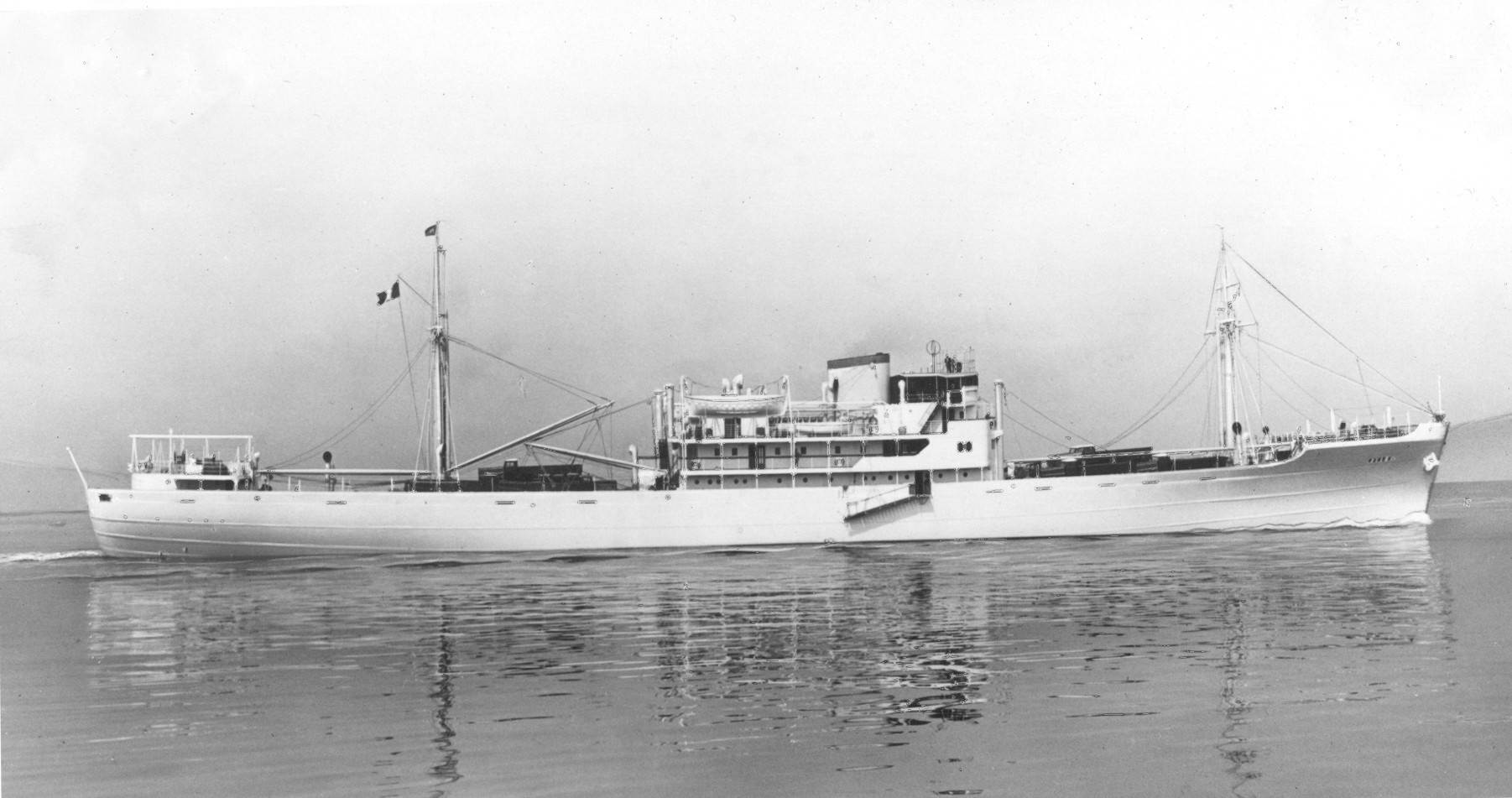
Ramb II in 1937

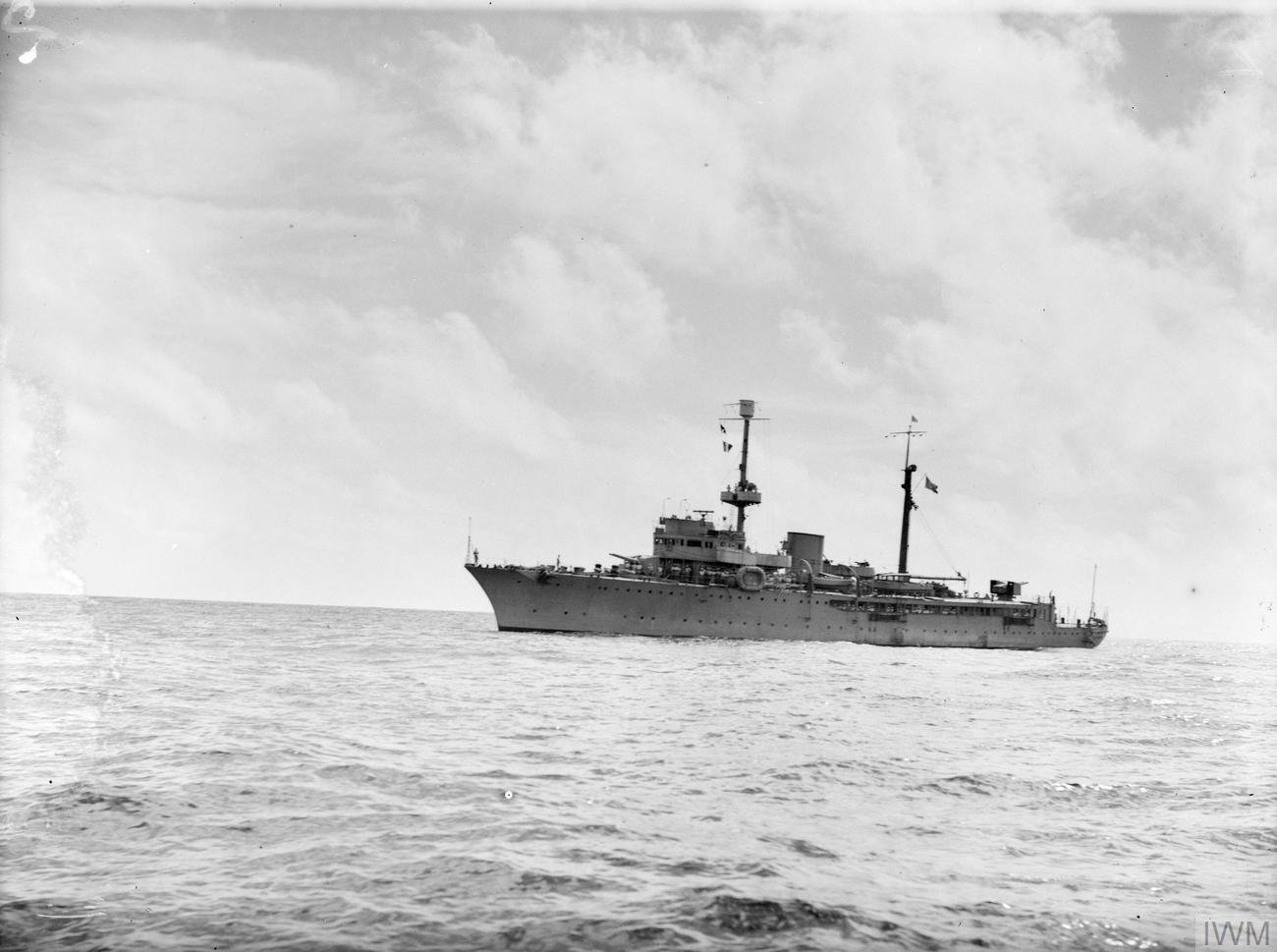
Eritrea surrendering, 14 September 1943

Other naval vessels
Name	Flag	GRT	Type	Notes
Eritrea	Kingdom of Italy	2,170	Colonial ship	Escaped to Kobe, Japan
Vincenzo Giordano Orsini	Kingdom of Italy	670	Giuseppe Sirtori-class destroyer	Scuttled 8 April 1941
Giovanni Acerbi	Kingdom of Italy	670	Giuseppe Sirtori-class destroyer	Bombed RAF, left a hulk
G. Biglieri	Kingdom of Italy	620	Gunboat	Captured
Porto Corsini	Kingdom of Italy	290	Gunboat	Scuttled
Ostia	Kingdom of Italy	620	Azio-class minelayer	Scuttled Massawa, 8 April 1941
Ramb I	Kingdom of Italy	3,667	Auxiliary cruiser	Escaped to Kobe, Japan (Note: Requisitioned, sunk Action of 27 February 1941 01°N,68°30'E, 150 killed, 100 rescued)
Ramb II	Kingdom of Italy	3,685	Auxiliary cruiser	Escaped to Kobe, Japan (Note: Requisitioned, scuttled, 8 September 1943, sunk USAAF, 12 January 1945)
Ramb IV	Kingdom of Italy	3,676	Hospital ship	Captured (Note: RN, hospital ship, bombed Luftwaffe 10 May 1942, 31°17'N, 29°23'E, 165 killed, 119 rescued)

=== Merchant ships (Massawa) ===
Freighters scuttled at Massawa
Name	Year	Flag	GRT	Type	Notes
Adua	1922	Merchant Navy	3,564	Freighter	Scuttled, 4 April 1941
Antonia C	1921	Merchant Navy	6,025	Tanker	Scuttled, 4 April 1941
MV Arabia	1926	Merchant Navy	7,025	Freighter	Scuttled, 4 April 1941, refloated 11 August
Brenta	1920	Merchant Navy	5,400	Freighter	Scuttled, with a mine attached, 4 April 1941, salvaged 1942
Clelia Campanella	1917	Merchant Navy	3,245	Tanker	Scuttled, 4 April 1941, salvaged 1942
Colombo	1917	Merchant Navy	11,760	Freighter	Scuttled, 8 April 1941
Impero	—	Merchant Navy	488	Freighter	Scuttled, April 1941
Moncalieri	1918	Merchant Navy	5,267	Freighter	Scuttled, April 1941, refloated
Riva Ligure	1906	Merchant Navy	2,100	Tanker	Scuttled, 4 April 1941,
Romolo Gessi	1917	Merchant Navy	5,100	Freighter	Scuttled, April 1941
Tripolitania	1918	Merchant Navy	2,722	Freighter	Scuttled, 6 April 1941, salvaged March 1943
Vesuvio	1914	Kingdom of Italy	5,430	Freighter	Scuttled, 4 April 1941
XXIII Marzo	1927	Kingdom of Italy	5,003	Freighter	Scuttled, 4 April 1941
Crefeld	1922	Nazi Germany	8,045	Freighter	Scuttled, April 1941, broken up
Frauenfels	1920	Nazi Germany	7,487	Freighter	Scuttled, April 1941, salvaged 13 November 1942
Gera	1923	Nazi Germany	5,155	Freighter	Scuttled, April 1941, salvaged 1942
Lichtenfels	1929	Nazi Germany	7,566	Freighter	Scuttled, April 1941, broken up
Liebenfels	1922	Nazi Germany	6,318	Freighter	Scuttled, April 1941, salvaged 30 September 1942
Olivia	7,885	Nazi Germany	7,886	Freighter	Scuttled, April 1941

=== Merchant ships (Dahlak Kebir) ===
Tugs and other vessels scuttled at Harmil off Massawa
Name	Year	Flag	GRT	Type	Notes
Ausonia	—	Merchant Navy	—	Tug	Scuttled April 1941
Capitano Bottego	1933	Merchant Navy	2,316	Fruit carrier	Scuttled, 4 April 1941
Giove	1914	Merchant Navy	5,211	Tanker	Scuttled 4 April 1941, salvaged 1942
Giuseppe Mazzini	1926	Merchant Navy	7,669	Freighter	Bombed 2 March 1941, sunk
Malamocco	—	Merchant Navy	—	Tug	Scuttled April 1941
Nazario Sauro	1924	Merchant Navy	8,150	Freighter	Scuttled 6 April 1941
Oneglia	—	Merchant Navy	—	Tug	Scuttled April 1941
Panaria	—	Merchant Navy	—	Tug	Scuttled April 1941
Pirano	—	Merchant Navy	—	Tug	Scuttled April 1941
Porto Venere	—	Merchant Navy	—	Tug	Scuttled April 1941
Prometeo	1922	Merchant Navy	4,958	Tanker	Scuttled 4 April 1941
Urania	1916	Merchant Navy	7,099	Freighter	Scuttled 4 April 1941

== See also ==
- Action of 8 May 1941
- Italian Royal Navy
- List of Italian destroyers
