= Costantino Borsini =

Italian naval officer (1906–1940)

- Born: 7 April 1906; Milan, Lombardy, Italy
- Died: 21 October 1940 (aged 34); Red Sea
- Military career
- Allegiance: Kingdom of Italy
- Branch: Regia Marina
- Service years: 1922–1940
- Rank: Capitano di Corvetta (Lieutenant Commander)
- Commands: Clio (torpedo boat); Francesco Nullo (destroyer)
- Conflicts: World War II; Attack on convoy BN 7
- Awards: Gold Medal of Military Valor (posthumous)

Costantino Borsini (April 7, 1906 – October 21, 1940) was an Italian naval officer during World War II. He received the Gold Medal of Military Valor for his actions in command of the destroyer Francesco Nullo in the Attack on Convoy BN 7 in October 1940.

== Biography ==
Borsini was born in Milan in 1906. He was a top student at the Naval Academy of Livorno from March 15, 1922, to November 15, 1926. There he graduated as an ensign, before embarking on the battleship Giulio Cesare. He was then transferred to the battleship Andrea Doria and later served in succession on the hydrographic ship Ammiraglio Magnaghi, the destroyer Augusto Riboty, the destroyer Giovanni Da Verrazzano (after promotion to sub-lieutenant on 1 January 1929) and again on Giulio Cesare, being promoted to lieutenant in July 1932.

In 1933 he joined the Italian Naval Detachment in Tianjin (China). At his return to Italy he attended the course in Taranto as "Aircraft Observer" (naval officer attached to Regia Aeronautica aircraft employed against shipping) and in 1935 he received his patent; he subsequently served for one year as member of the 153rd Seaplane Squadron.

He was then transferred to the submarine branch until 1937, when he became executive officer on the destroyer Nembo, after which he was given command of the torpedo boat Clio.

In January 1940 he was embarked on the colonial ship Eritrea, stationed in the Eritrean Red Sea at Massawa, and in May of that year he was promoted to lieutenant commander and was given command of the destroyer Francesco Nullo, operating in the Red Sea.

On October 21, following the unsuccessful attack on convoy BN 7, Borsini fought a fierce battle off Harmil island against HMS Kimberley. In the battle, Nullo was seriously damaged, and Borsini brought his ship toward an Italian coastal battery so that its guns could hit Kimberley.

When Nullo started to sink, Borsini ordered the crew to save themselves, and decided to go down with his ship while at his command post. His orderly, seaman Vincenzo Ciaravolo, went back on board the sinking ship to reach his commander, and both went down with the ship. Both posthumously were awarded the Gold Medal of Military Valor. The attacking British destroyer Kimberley was hit by the Italian batteries and remained in repair until spring 1941.

== Action off Harmil Island ==
After the first minutes of combat against the British convoy BN 7, Francesco Nullo manoeuvred so as to attack again the convoy before following the destroyer Pantera toward Massawa, but Nullo's rudder jammed for several minutes, and the two ships lost contact with each other. Borsini, chased by the incoming British warships, decided to approach the Italian batteries on Harmil island, hoping that they could hit the attacking enemy vessels.

At 02:20 British light cruiser Leander spotted Nullo, and engaged her at a range of 4,200 metres (4,600 yd). The ships dueled for around ten minutes. Leander scored several hits, damaging Nullo's gyrocompass and gunnery director. Nullo withdrew toward Harmil island and Leander pursued. Destroyer Kimberley joined the pursuit at 0300. At 0305 Leander turned back for the convoy.

At 05:40 on 21 October, Kimberley was off Harmil Island when her lookouts spotted Nullo. Nullo spotted Kimberley around the same time, but Borsini assumed that the approaching destroyer was sistership Sauro. Kimberley opened fire at 05:53, catching Nullo by surprise. Nullo returned fire four minutes later, and at 06:15 the four Italian 120 mm guns on Harmil Island joined the action.

At around 06:25 Nullo was hit by two shells from Kimberley, one each in the forward and aft engine rooms. Nullo lost all power. Borsini gave the order to abandon ship and steered the ship towards Harmil, attempting to run it aground. He decided to sink with his ship. Borsini and his orderly Ciaravolo, who decided to die with him, were awarded the Gold Medal of Military Valor by the Italian Navy.

Kimberley fired two torpedoes at Nullo. The second of these, at 06:35, tore Nullo in two. The Harmil battery then found the range and landed a shell on Kimberley's engine room, causing the ship to lose power. Kimberley fired at the shore battery while the crew frantically repaired the damage. Finally, Kimberley's power was restored, and the ship managed to get out of range of the Harmil battery before losing power again and later be towed to safety in Port Sudan.

Of the 204 members of Nullo's crew, 190 survived and were rescued by personnel of the Harmil battery, while 12 perished in combat and two (Lieutenant Commander Borsini and his orderly Ciaravolo) voluntarily sank with the ship. The Italian Royal Navy, fearing that such attitude would cause the loss of too many experienced commanders (two more Italian navy commanders - Enrico Baroni of destroyer Espero and Lorenzo Bezzi of submarine Liuzzi - had already done so in the few months of war since Italy declared war to the Allies in June 1940), emitted on the next week an informal 'instruction' discouraging such actions (to little avail, as such episodes happened again several times during the war).

== Bibliography ==
- Giuseppe Vingiano. L'epopea del Cacciatorpediniere "Nullo", Editoriale di propaganda. Roma, 1942
- Vincenzo Meleca, " Tragedia alle Dahlak! L'affondamento del 'Francesco Nullo', http://www.ilcornodafrica.it/st-melecatragedia.pdf

== See also ==
- Red Sea Flotilla
- Attack on Convoy BN 7
