= Graf Spee =

Graf Spee may refer to:

- Graf Maximilian von Spee, German admiral in World War I

or to several German ships that were named after the admiral:

- SMS Graf Spee, incomplete Mackensen-class battlecruiser of World War I, scrapped in 1923
- The German cruiser Admiral Graf Spee, launched in 1934, that saw action in World War II
- HMS Flamingo, later renamed Graf Spee, a former Royal Navy Black Swan-class sloop used as a Bundesmarine training ship
