= Sauro-class destroyer =

Italian naval ship class (1927–1941)

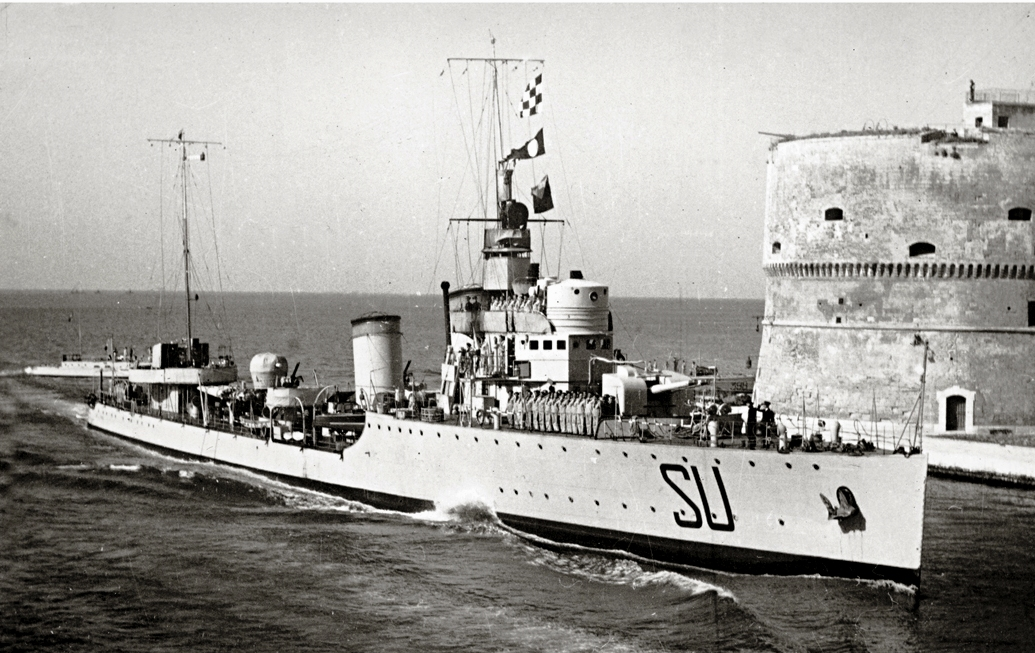
- Italian destroyer Sauro

Class overview
- Name: Sauro class
- Operators: Regia Marina
- Preceded by: Sella class
- Succeeded by: Turbine class
- Built: 1924–1927
- In commission: 1927–1941
- Completed: 4
- Lost: 4

General characteristics (as built)
- Type: Destroyer
- Displacement: 1,058 t (1,041 long tons) (standard); 1,600 t (1,570 long tons) (full load)
- Length: 90.16 m (295 ft 10 in)
- Beam: 9.2 m (30 ft 2 in)
- Draught: 2.9 m (9 ft 6 in)
- Installed power: 3 Yarrow boilers; 36,000 shp (27,000 kW)
- Propulsion: 2 shafts; 2 geared steam turbines
- Speed: 31 knots (57 km/h; 36 mph)
- Range: 2,600 nmi (4,800 km; 3,000 mi) at 14 knots (26 km/h; 16 mph)
- Complement: 154–156
- Armament: 2 × twin 120 mm (4.7 in) guns; 2 × single 40 mm (1.6 in) AA guns; 2 × single 13.2 mm (0.52 in) machine guns; 2 × triple 533 mm (21 in) torpedo tubes; 52 mines

The Sauro class were a group of four destroyers built for the Regia Marina (Royal Italian Navy) in the late 1920s. They were based in the Red Sea Italian colony of Eritrea and all fought in World War II being sunk during the East African Campaign in 1941.

== Design and description ==
The Sauro-class destroyers were enlarged and improved versions of the preceding Sella class. They had an overall length of 90.16 meters (296 ft), a beam of 9.2 meters (30 ft 2 in) and a mean draft of 2.9 meters (9 ft 6 in). They displaced 1,058 metric tons (1,041 long tons) at standard load, and 1,600 metric tons (1,570 long tons) at deep load. Their complement was 8–10 officers and 146 enlisted men.

The Sauros were powered by two Parsons geared steam turbines, each driving one propeller shaft using steam supplied by three Yarrow boilers. The turbines were rated at 36,000 shaft horsepower (27,000 kW) for a speed of 31 knots (57 km/h; 36 mph) in service, although the ships reached speeds in excess of 36 knots (67 km/h; 41 mph) during their sea trials while lightly loaded. They carried enough fuel oil to give them a range of 2,600 nautical miles (4,800 km; 3,000 mi) at a speed of 14 knots (26 km/h; 16 mph).

Their main battery consisted of four 120-millimeter (4.7 in) guns in two twin-gun turrets, one each fore and aft of the superstructure. Anti-aircraft (AA) defense for the Sauro-class ships was provided by a pair of 40-millimeter (1.6 in) AA guns in single mounts amidships and a pair of 13.2-millimeter (0.52 in) machine guns. They were equipped with six 533-millimeter (21 in) torpedo tubes in two triple mounts amidships. The Sauros could also carry 52 mines.

== Ships ==
These ships formed the 3rd Squadrilla and were based in the Red Sea.

Construction data
Ship name	Namesake	Builder	Completed	Fate
Cesare Battisti	Cesare Battisti	Odero, Sestri Ponente	13 April 1927	Scuttled 3 April 1941
Daniele Manin	Daniele Manin	CNQ Fiume	1 March 1927	Sunk by aerial bombing, 3 April 1941
Francesco Nullo	Francesco Nullo	CNQ Fiume	15 April 1927	Beached on Harmil island following a battle with HMS Kimberley, 21 October 1940; destroyed by three RAF Bristol Blenheim bombers the next day
Nazario Sauro	Nazario Sauro	Odero, Sestri Ponente	23 September 1926	Sunk by an Allied bombing, 3 April 1941

== Operational history ==
The destroyers were outfitted for colonial service, and by 1935 they were deployed in the naval base of Massawa, Eritrea. Italian's entry in World War II left Italian East Africa isolated from Italy.

=== Attack on convoy BN 7 ===
The only appreciable action in which the destroyers were involved was the attack on the Allied convoy BN 7, on the first hours of 21 October 1940. Nullo and Sauro, along with Leone and Pantera shelled the convoy and its escort, inflicting some splinter damage to the leading transport ship, and launched at least two torpedoes aimed at HMAS Yarra, which successfully dodged them. The attack was nevertheless repulsed by the cruiser HMS Leander, which fired 129 six-inch rounds on the Italian destroyers. While Sauro and the other destroyers successfully disengaged, Nullo was chased by the destroyer HMS Kimberley and forced to run aground on Harmil island, where she was later wrecked by RAF Blenheim bombers. Kimberley took two hits on a boiler from coastal batteries, and had to be towed to Aden by HMS Leander.

=== End of the surviving units ===
The three surviving destroyers remained at dock in Massawa until the very end of ground operations in East Africa. Their commander ordered them to steam out on 2 April 1941, for an almost suicidal attack on Port Sudan. The squadron was soon discovered by British air reconnaissance, and immediately bombed by land-based Swordfish aircraft from the aircraft carrier HMS Eagle. Battisti managed to reach the Arabian coast, where she was scuttled by her crew. Manin and Sauro kept firing their antiaircraft guns until they were sunk by the British planes.

== Bibliography ==
- Brescia, Maurizio (2012). Mussolini's Navy: A Reference Guide to the Regina Marina 1930–45. Annapolis, Maryland: Naval Institute Press. ISBN 978-1-59114-544-8.
- Campbell, John (1985). Naval Weapons of World War Two. Annapolis, Maryland: Naval Institute Press. ISBN 0-87021-459-4.
- Fraccaroli, Aldo (1968). Italian Warships of World War II. Shepperton, UK: Ian Allan. ISBN 0-7110-0002-6.
- McMurtrie, Francis E., ed. (1937). Jane's Fighting Ships 1937. London: Sampson Low. OCLC 927896922.
- O'Hara, Vincent P. (2009). Struggle for the Middle Sea: The Great Navies at War in the Mediterranean Theater, 1940–1945. Annapolis, Maryland: Naval Institute Press. ISBN 978-1-59114-648-3.
- Roberts, John (1980). "Italy". In Chesneau, Roger (ed.). Conway's All the World's Fighting Ships 1922–1946. New York: Mayflower Books. pp. 280–317. ISBN 0-8317-0303-2.
- Rohwer, Jürgen (2005). Chronology of the War at Sea 1939–1945: The Naval History of World War Two (Third Revised ed.). Annapolis, Maryland: Naval Institute Press. ISBN 1-59114-119-2.
- Whitley, M. J. (1988). Destroyers of World War 2: An International Encyclopedia. Annapolis, Maryland: Naval Institute Press. ISBN 1-85409-521-8.
