= HMAS Yarra (U77) =

Grimsby-class sloop of the Royal Australian Navy

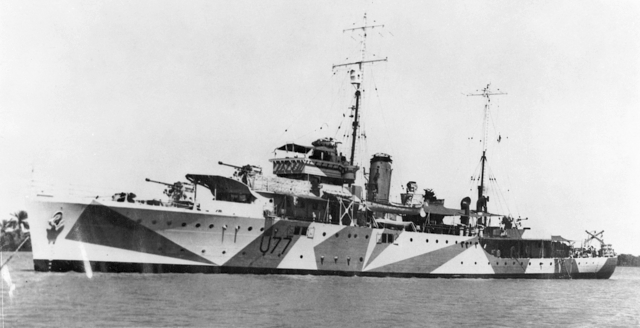
- HMAS Yarra

History

Australia
- Namesake: The Yarra River
- Builder: Cockatoo Island Dockyard
- Laid down: 24 May 1934
- Launched: 28 March 1935
- Commissioned: 19 December 1935
- Honours and awards: Battle honours: Libya 1941; East Indies 1942; Plus two inherited honours; Awards: Unit Citation for Gallantry
- Fate: Sunk by Japanese cruisers, 4 March 1942
- Badge

General characteristics
- Class & type: Grimsby-class sloop
- Displacement: 1,060 tons (standard), 1,500 tons (full load)
- Length: 266 ft 3 in (81.15 m)
- Beam: 36 ft (11 m)
- Draught: 7.5 to 10 ft (2.3 to 3.0 m)
- Propulsion: 2 × Admiralty 3-drum boilers, Parsons turbines, 2,000 shp (1,500 kW), 2 shafts
- Speed: 16.5 knots (30.6 km/h; 19.0 mph)
- Complement: 135 peace, 160 war
- Armament: 3 × QF 4-inch (101.6 mm) Mk V anti-aircraft guns

HMAS Yarra (U77), named after the Yarra River, was a Grimsby-class sloop of the Royal Australian Navy (RAN) that served during World War II. Commissioned in 1936, Yarra spent the early war years patrolling Australian waters before being assigned to the East Indies Station in 1940. The sloop operated in the Red Sea, then was involved in the Anglo-Iraqi War and the Anglo-Soviet invasion of Iran. After operating as part of the Tobruk Ferry Service in the Mediterranean during November, Yarra was reassigned to Southeast Asia in response to Japanese advances. On 4 March 1942, Yarra was attacked and sunk by a force of Japanese cruisers and destroyers while attempting to protect ships withdrawing to Australia.

== Design and construction ==
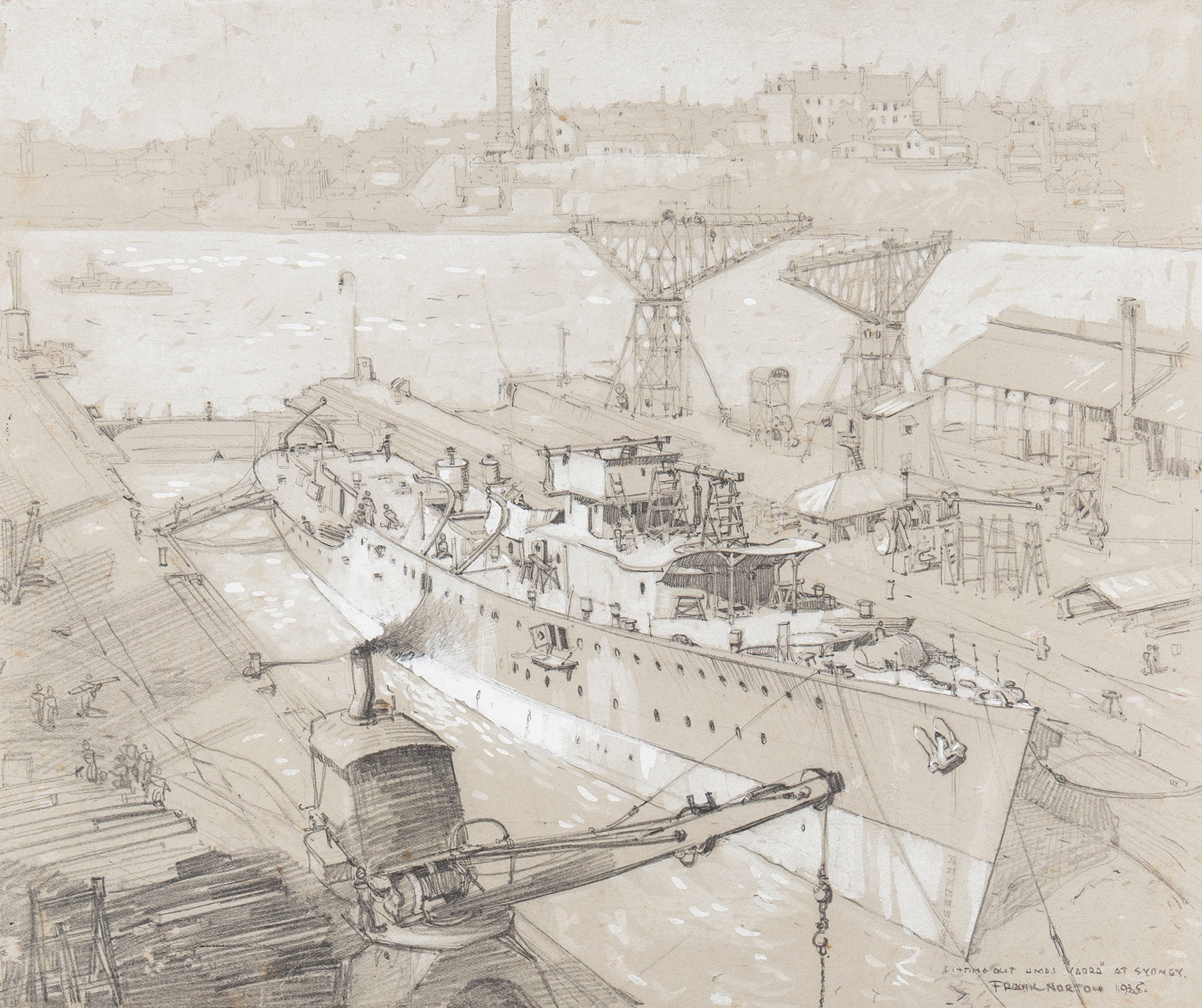
Fitting Out H.M.A.S. Yarra at Sydney (1935) by Frank Norton

The Grimsby class consisted of thirteen sloops, four of which were built in Australia for the RAN. Yarra, one of the first pair, had a displacement of 1,060 tons at standard load and 1,500 tons at full load, was 266 feet 3 inches (81.15 m) long, had a beam of 36 feet (11 m), and a draught of between 7.5 and 10 feet (2.3 and 3.0 m) depending on load. Propulsion machinery consisted of two Admiralty 3-drum boilers connected to Parsons geared turbines, which delivered 2,000 shaft horsepower (1,500 kW) to the sloop's two propeller shafts. This gave Yarra a respectable speed for her class of 16.5 knots (30.6 km/h; 19.0 mph). The ship's company in peacetime consisted of 135 officers and sailors; this increased to 160 during the war.

Yarra's armament consisted of three QF 4-inch (101.6 mm) Mk V anti-aircraft guns along with additional light weapons for close range defence.

Yarra was laid down by the Cockatoo Island Dockyard at Sydney, New South Wales on 24 May 1934, launched on 28 March 1935 by Florence Parkhill, the wife of Archdale Parkhill, Minister for Defence, and commissioned into the RAN on 21 January 1936.

== Operational history ==
In December 1939, Yarra was attached to the 20th Minesweeping Flotilla. On 28 August 1940, the sloop sailed from Fremantle for service on the East Indies Station. She arrived in Aden on 18 September, then was assigned to convoy operations in the Red Sea.

On 20 October, Yarra was part of the escort for Allied convoy BN 7. The convoy was attacked by a force of Italian destroyers; these were driven off, with the Francesco Nullo forced aground. During the action, two torpedoes were fired by the Italians at Yarra; the sloop successfully evaded both.

From March until April 1941, Yarra was docked at Bombay for refitting. On 12 April, the sloop joined the escort of Convoy BP7 from Karachi to the port of Basra, in the Persian Gulf. After arriving in the gulf, Yarra became involved in the Anglo-Iraqi War. During August, the ship operated in Iranian waters in support of the Anglo-Soviet invasion. The sloop secured several ports and oil-producing facilities, sank the sloop Babr, and was involved in the capture of two Iranian gunboats and the Italian ship Hilda. In November, the sloop was transferred to the Mediterranean, and operated as part of the Tobruk Ferry Service.

In December, the Japanese declaration of war saw Yarra reassigned to Southeast Asia. She left Alexandria on 9 December and reached Java on 11 January 1942, where she commenced convoy escort duties. On 5 February, the sloop escorted a convoy to Singapore; the last convoy to arrive before the city was captured by the Japanese. While en route, the convoy was attacked by Japanese aircraft: Yarra shot down one and damaged several others, then rescued over 1,800 soldiers from the burning troopship SS Empress of Asia. On 6 February, the sloop left Singapore with a southbound convoy. Yarra left the convoy when near Palembang to take up the tow of the disabled destroyer Vendetta, with the two ships successfully reaching Tanjong Priok.

== Loss ==
The deterioration of the Allied position in Southeast Asia promoted a general withdrawal south. On 2 March, Yarra arrived at Tjilatjap with the depot ship Anking, the tanker Francol, and the minesweeper MMS-51: the sloop was ordered to escort the other three ships to Fremantle. A day later, the ship rescued forty survivors of the Dutch ship Paragi from liferafts.

Early on 4 March 1942, the convoy encountered a Japanese fleet: the cruisers Atago, Takao, and Maya, accompanied by four destroyers. Yarra's commander, Robert William Rankin, laid down a smokescreen, then ordered the convoy to scatter while the sloop held off the Japanese warships. Despite the efforts of Yarra, the other three Allied ships were pursued and sunk, and the sloop was sunk by cruiser gunfire shortly after 08:00, with only 34 survivors from the ship's company and the Paragi rescuees. Attrition reduced the number of survivors to 13 by the time they were rescued on 9 March by the Dutch submarine K XI.

The ship's fate inspired the film Always Another Dawn (1948).

The sloop's wartime service was later recognised with two battle honours: "Libya 1941" and "East Indies 1942". In March 2013, Governor-General Quentin Bryce announced that a Unit Citation for Gallantry would be retroactively awarded to the ship's company of Yarra at the time of her sinking. This was presented to the Chief of Navy and the ship's company of the minehunter HMAS Yarra (M 87), on the River Yarra, on 4 March 2014, the anniversary of the sloop Yarra's loss.
