= Carlo Balsamo di Specchia-Normandia =

Italian naval commander

- Born: 20 April 1890; Taranto, Kingdom of Italy
- Died: 22 May 1960 (aged 70); Settignano, Italy
- Military career
- Allegiance: Kingdom of Italy; Italy
- Branch: Regia Marina; Italian Navy
- Rank: Fleet Admiral
- Commands: F 1 (submarine); F 6 (submarine); 51 OS (torpedo boat); 63 OL (torpedo boat); Giuseppe La Farina (destroyer); Andrea Provana (submarine); Italian battalion in China; Naval Command School; 3rd Submarine Flotilla; Italian East Africa Naval Department; Naval Department of Naples; Naval Department of Taranto
- Conflicts: Italo-Turkish War; World War I; World War II; East African campaign
- Awards: War Cross for Military Valor; War Merit Cross (three times); Order of Saints Maurice and Lazarus; Order of the Crown of Italy; Colonial Order of the Star of Italy; Order of Merit of the Italian Republic

Carlo Balsamo di Specchia-Normandia (Taranto, 20 April 1890 – Settignano, 22 May 1960) was an Italian admiral, commander of the naval forces of Italian East Africa during the early stages of World War II.

== Biography ==
He was born in Taranto on 20 April 1890 and entered the Livorno Naval Academy in 1907, graduating in 1911 with the rank of ensign. During the Italo-Turkish War he served as junior officer on various capital ships, and after promotion to lieutenant he served on submarines (Nautilus, F 1, and H 3) during World War I, earning a War Cross for Military Valor. From 1920 to 1922 he commanded the submarine F 1 and then her sister boat F 6.

During the 1920s he commanded the torpedo boats 51 OS and 63 OL, the destroyer Giuseppe La Farina and the submarine Andrea Provana, until his promotion to commander in 1928, when he was sent to China in command of the marines battalion stationed in the Italian concession of Tientsin, until 1930. After repatriation, he was promoted to captain and appointed in succession deputy commander of the Taranto Navy Yard, Chief of Staff of the Naval Department of Taranto, naval attaché in Spain and Portugal, commander of the Naval Command School and commander of the 3rd Submarine Flotilla.

In the late 1930s he was attached to the headquarters of the Italian Armed Forces in East Africa in Addis Ababa, and in late 1939, after promotion to rear admiral, he was appointed commander-in-chief of Italian naval forces in Italian East Africa, with headquarters in Massawa. He held this post in the early stages of Italy's participation in World War II, being replaced in December 1940 by Read Admiral Mario Bonetti and repatriated. In July 1941 he was appointed naval attaché in Tokyo, being later promoted to vice admiral. After the Armistice of Cassibile in September 1943, he was imprisoned by the Japanese for two years, being liberated after the surrender of Japan in September 1945 and repatriated in February 1946.

In 1947, after promotion to Fleet Admiral, he was made commander of the Naval Department of Naples, and in 1948 of the Naval Department of Taranto. He was transferred to the naval reserve in 1951, and died in Settignano on 22 May 1960.
