= Italian destroyer Tigre =

Destroyer of the Regia Marina

History

Kingdom of Italy
- Name: Tigre
- Namesake: Tiger
- Builder: Gio. Ansaldo & C., Sestri Ponente
- Laid down: 23 January 1922
- Launched: 7 August 1924
- Completed: 10 October 1924
- Fate: Scuttled, 3/4 April 1941

General characteristics (as built)
- Class & type: Leone-class destroyer
- Displacement: 2,195 long tons (2,230 t) (normal); 2,289 long tons (2,326 t) (full load)
- Length: 113.41 m (372 ft 1 in) (o/a)
- Beam: 10.36 m (34 ft)
- Draught: 3.1 m (10 ft 2 in) (mean)
- Installed power: 4 Yarrow boilers; 42,000 hp (31,000 kW)
- Propulsion: 2 shafts; 2 geared steam turbines
- Speed: 33 knots (61 km/h; 38 mph)
- Range: 2,000 nmi (3,700 km; 2,300 mi) at 15 knots (28 km/h; 17 mph)
- Complement: 10 officers and 194 enlisted men
- Armament: 4 × twin 120 mm (4.7 in) guns; 2 × single 76 mm (3 in) AA guns; 2 × triple 450 mm (17.7 in) torpedo tubes; 60 mines

Tigre was one of three Leone-class destroyers built for the Regia Marina (Royal Italian Navy) in the early 1920s.

== Design and description ==
The ships were designed as scout cruisers (esploratori), essentially enlarged versions of contemporary destroyers. They were initially ordered in 1917, but postponed due to steel shortages, and re-ordered in 1920. They had an overall length of 113.41 meters (372 ft), a beam of 10.36 meters (34 ft) and a mean draft of 3.1 meters (10 ft 2 in). They displaced 2,195 long tons (2,230 t) at standard load, and 2,289 long tons (2,330 t) at deep load. Their complement was 10 officers and 194 enlisted men.

The Leones were powered by two Parsons geared steam turbines, each driving one propeller shaft using steam supplied by four Yarrow boilers. The turbines were rated at 42,000 shaft horsepower (31,000 kW) for a speed of 33 knots (61 km/h; 38 mph) in service, although Tigre reached 33.5 knots (62.0 km/h; 38.6 mph) from 46,272 shp (34,505 kW) during her sea trials. The ships carried enough fuel oil to give them a range of 2,000 nautical miles (3,700 km; 2,300 mi) at a speed of 15 knots (28 km/h; 17 mph).

Their main battery consisted of eight 120-millimeter (4.7 in) guns in four twin-gun turrets, one each fore and aft of the superstructure and the remaining turrets positioned between the funnels and the torpedo tube mounts amidships. Anti-aircraft (AA) defense for the Leone-class ships was provided by a pair of 76 mm (3 in) AA guns in single mounts amidships. They were equipped with six 450-millimeter (17.7 in) torpedo tubes in two triple mounts. The Leones could also carry 60 mines.

== Bibliography ==
- Brescia, Maurizio (2012). Mussolini's Navy: A Reference Guide to the Regina Marina 1930–45. Annapolis, Maryland: Naval Institute Press. ISBN 978-1-59114-544-8.
- Fraccaroli, Aldo (1968). Italian Warships of World War II. Shepperton, UK: Ian Allan. ISBN 0-7110-0002-6.
- Gray, Randal, ed. (1985). Conway's All the World's Fighting Ships 1906–1921. Annapolis, Maryland: Naval Institute Press. ISBN 978-0-87021-907-8.
- McMurtrie, Francis E., ed. (1937). Jane's Fighting Ships 1937. London: Sampson Low. OCLC 927896922.
- Rohwer, Jürgen (2005). Chronology of the War at Sea 1939–1945: The Naval History of World War Two (Third Revised ed.). Annapolis, Maryland: Naval Institute Press. ISBN 1-59114-119-2.
- Whitley, M. J. (1988). Destroyers of World War 2: An International Encyclopedia. Annapolis, Maryland: Naval Institute Press. ISBN 1-85409-521-8.
