= HMIS Indus =

Royal Indian Navy sloop

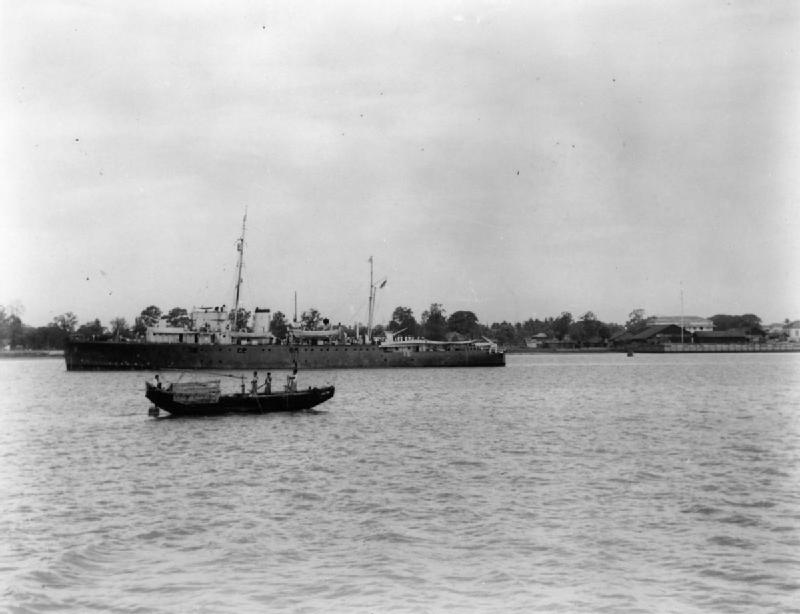
- Indus in Akyab harbour, Burma, 1942

History

India
- Name: Indus
- Namesake: Indus
- Builder: Hawthorn Leslie and Company
- Laid down: 8 December 1933
- Launched: 24 August 1934
- Commissioned: 15 March 1935
- Identification: Pennant number: L67 (U67 after 1940)
- Fate: Sunk by Japanese aircraft off Akyab, 6 April 1942

General characteristics
- Class & type: Grimsby class sloop
- Displacement: 1,190 long tons (1,210 t) standard load
- Length: 296 ft 4 in (90.32 m) oa
- Beam: 35 ft 6 in (10.82 m)
- Draught: 10 ft 9 in (3.28 m)
- Propulsion: Parsons geared turbines; 2 shafts, 2 Admiralty 3-drum type boilers, 2,000 shp (1,500 kW); Oil fuel: 341 tons
- Speed: 16.25 kn (30.10 km/h; 18.70 mph)
- Complement: 119
- Armament: 2 × 4.7 in (120 mm) Mark IX guns, 4 × 3-pounder guns, 1 × quadruple Vickers .50 machine gun mount

HMIS Indus was a Grimsby-class sloop of the Royal Indian Navy launched in 1934 and sunk during the Second World War in 1942. She was a slightly enlarged version of other vessels in the Grimsby class. She was named after the Indus River. Indus served mainly as an escort vessel, and she was therefore lightly armed. Her pennant number was changed to U67 in 1940.

== History ==
Indus was a part of the Eastern Fleet during the war.

In March 1942, British Indian Army and British Army troops from Rangoon had to be withdrawn, as they were overwhelmed by the superior numbers as well as the air command of the Japanese. Akyab was the next port to be attacked by the Japanese in April. Despite this, the Flag-Officer-Commanding of the Eastern Fleet refused to withdraw Indus and Sutlej from the anti-infiltration patrol off Akyab.

== Fate ==
On 6 April 1942, Indus was bombed and sunk by Japanese Mitsubishi G3M bombers off Akyab, Burma in position 20°7′N 92°54′E. She suffered 3 direct bomb hits and sank in 35 minutes. There was no loss of life to her crew although 10 were injured.

=== Commanding officers ===
Indus commanding officers during her service were:

- Commander Eric George Guilding (24 November 1938 – 23 September 1941)
- Lieutenant Commander Jesser Evelyn Napier (23 September 1941 – 6 April 1942) - promoted to commander on 25 October 1941
- Commander James Wilfred Jefford

== See also ==
- HMIS Jumna
- HMIS Sutlej
