= HMS Flamingo (L18) =

Sloop of the Royal Navy

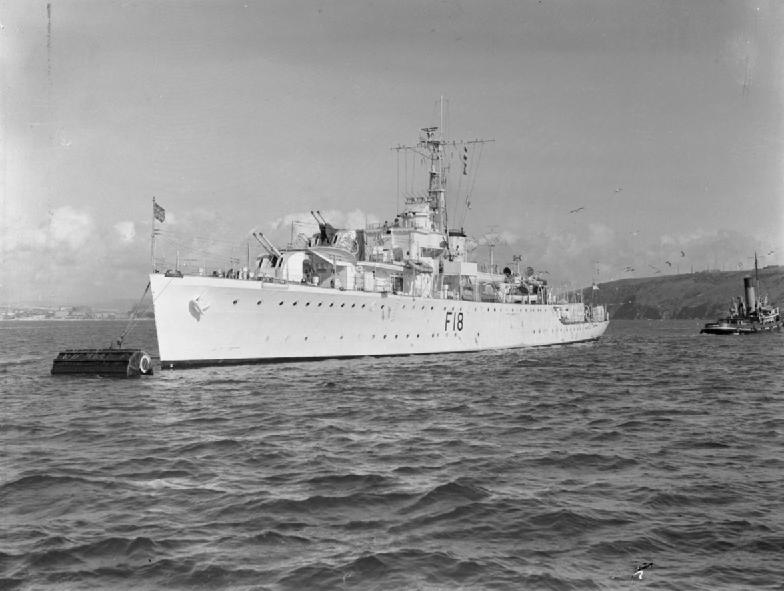
- Flamingo in Plymouth Sound in 1949

History

United Kingdom
- Name: HMS Flamingo
- Builder: Yarrow Shipbuilders, Scotstoun, Scotland
- Laid down: 26 May 1938
- Launched: 18 April 1939
- Completed: 3 November 1939
- Identification: Pennant number L18/F18
- Honours and awards: NORTH SEA 1939-40; NORWAY 1940; GREECE 1941; CRETE 1941; LIBYA 1941; BURMA 1944-45
- Fate: Sold to West Germany, 21 January 1959
- Badge: On a Field Gold, upon water in base barry wavy Blue and White a flamingo proper

History

West Germany
- Name: Graf Spee
- Acquired: 21 January 1959
- Decommissioned: 1964
- Identification: Pennant number F215
- Fate: Broken up, 1965

General characteristics
- Class & type: Black Swan-class sloop

HMS Flamingo was a Black Swan-class sloop of the Royal Navy. She saw service as a convoy escort during the Second World War, seeing extensive service in the Mediterranean and Far East in 1945.

She was sold to the Federal Republic of Germany in 1959, where she was renamed Graf Spee and used as a cadet training ship.

== Construction ==
Flamingo was built by Yarrow Shipbuilders, Scotstoun, Scotland, was laid down on 26 May 1938, launched on 18 April 1939, and completed 3 November 1939.

She was adopted by the civil town of Runcorn in Cheshire as part of Warship Week in 1942.

== Royal Navy service ==
In 1940 Flamingo undertook convoy protection duties in the North Sea. In April of that year she undertook duties in support of military operations in Norway. The following month she transferred for duties in the Mediterranean and subsequently undertook convoy escort duties in the Red Sea. In April 1941 she transferred to the Mediterranean Fleet and was damaged in December 1941 by air attack, whilst in support of military operations in Tobruk.

During 1942 and 1943 she underwent repair and was re-commissioned at Bombay in January 1944 for trials. She then undertook convoy defence duties in the Indian Ocean and remained as part of the British Pacific Fleet. In 1945 she supported military operations in the landing at Myebon, as part of the Burma Campaign. In May 1945 she returned to the UK for refit.

Following the war she was placed in reserve, before refit for service in the Persian Gulf, which was completed in 1949. This involved the removal of the Anti-Submarine equipment on the Quarterdeck, which was replaced with a new deckhouse. She also received the new pennant number 'F18'. She served there until 1955 when she returned to Devonport and was put on the disposal list.

== West German Navy service ==
In 1957, West Germany purchased seven escorts, including Flamingo for its newly established Bundesmarine. After refit by Vickers-Armstrongs (Shipbuilders) Ltd at Hebburn-on-Tyne, she was handed over to the Bundesmarine on 21 January 1959, and was renamed Graf Spee. She was used as a cadet training ship and was armed with six Bofors guns, in place of the twin 4-inch armament.

She was based at Kiel and remained operational until 1964.

== Publications ==
- Blackman, Raymond V. B. (1971). Jane's Fighting Ships 1971–72. London: Sampson Low, Marston & Company. ISBN 0-354-00096-9.
- Blair, Clay (2000). Hitler's U-Boat War: The Hunted 1942–1945. New York: Modern Library. ISBN 0-679-64033-9.
- Colledge, J. J.; Warlow, Ben (2006) [1969]. Ships of the Royal Navy: The Complete Record of All Fighting Ships of the Royal Navy from the 15th Century to the Present (3rd Rev ed.). London: Chatham Publishing. ISBN 978-1-86176-281-8. OCLC 67375475.
- Gardiner, Robert; Chesneau, Roger (1980). Conway's All The World's Fighting Ships 1922–1946. London: Conway Maritime Press. ISBN 0-85177-146-7.
- Gardiner, Robert; Chumbley, Stephen (1995). Conway's All The World's Fighting Ships 1947–1995. Annapolis, Maryland, USA: Naval Institute Press. ISBN 1-55750-132-7.
- Hague, Arnold (1993). Sloops: A History of the 71 Sloops Built in Britain and Australia for the British, Australian and Indian Navies 1926–1946. Kendal, England: World Ship Society. ISBN 0-905617-67-3.
