= Harmil =

Uninhabited island in Eritrea

Coordinates: 16°31′23″N 40°09′25″E

Disputed island
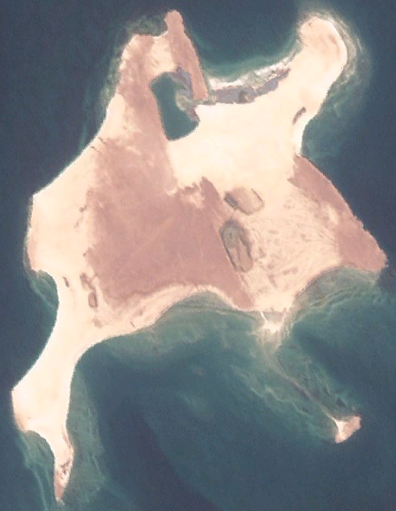
- Satellite view, Sail Harmil is at the bottom right
- Interactive map of Harmil

Geography
- Location: Red Sea
- Total islands: 1

Administration
- Eritrea

Demographics
- Population: 0

Harmil is an uninhabited island in Eritrea that forms part of the Dahlak Archipelago. The inhabitants are serving members of the Eritrean Navy who have a small outpost on the island. The outpost consists of a small pier in the southwest bay and a camp about 1 km north-northwest from the pier that may be unoccupied.

The island is not high, standing less than 3 meters above the sea level (the nearby islet Sail Harmil to south-southeast is 14 m high) and therefore offers limited protection from the wind. There are three possible anchorages to be used depending on the direction of the wind. The southwest corner of the northeast bay contains an entrance into a sheltered lagoon fully protected by mangroves and accessible by dinghy.

The Eritrean Navy operates the outpost to observe the nearby waters for unwanted foreign visitors or vessels. They carry out patrols in the waters surrounding the island using dhows and skiffs. The forces personnel on the island spend 4–6 months on the island with the only contact with the outside world being via medium-frequency radio to their headquarters just south of Massawa over 97 kilometres (60 mi) away.

The island itself is a desert-like environment with very little vegetation; however, the forces there do maintain herds of cows and goats. Due to the very low lay of the land, the winds blowing across the islands can be severe.

== See also ==
- List of islands of Africa

== Sources ==
- Davies, Stephen; Morgan, Elaine (2024). "Harmil". Red Sea Pilot. Imray, Laurie, Norie and Wilson Ltd. p. 66. ISBN 978-1-78679-350-8.
