= Rail transport in Somalia =

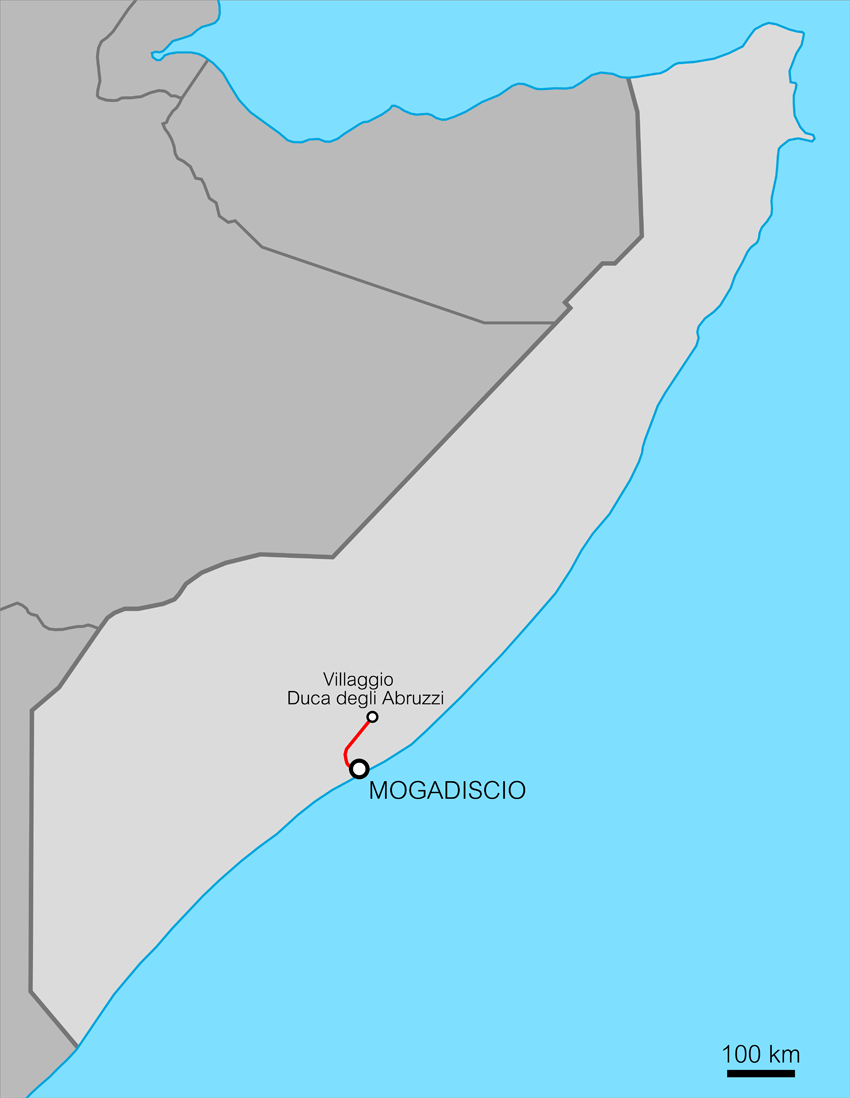
Italian Somalia railway

Railway transport in Somalia consisted of the erstwhile Mogadishu–Villabruzzi Railway and secondary tracks. The system was built during the 1910s by the authorities in Italian Somaliland. Its track gauge was 950 mm (3 ft 1 3/8 in), a gauge favoured by the Italians in their colonies in the Horn of Africa and North Africa. The railway was dismantled in the 1940s by the British during their military occupation of Italian Somaliland, and was subsequently never rehabilitated.

== Ferrovia Mogadiscio-Villabruzzi ==
The 114 km of the Mogadishu-Villabruzzi Railway (called in Italian "Ferrovia Mogadiscio-Villabruzzi") was the first railway in Italian Somaliland. It was built initially for the surrounding area of Mogadishu (Mogadiscio in Italian) after World War I. According to the initial project -done in the early 1910s- the railway should have reached Lugh from Mogadishu, but economical problems due to the expenses related to WW1 stopped the construction of the railway to a few dozen km of line from the port of Italian Mogadiscio.

In the 1920s, Principe Luigi Amedeo, Duca degli Abruzzi, a senior member of the Italian Royal Family, had the railway extended to the Shebelle River agricultural settlements that he was then developing. The railway reached Villabruzzi (Jowhar) in 1927.

In 1930, the railway transported 19,359 passengers, including tourists. During the same year, 43,467 tons of products (mainly agricultural) were transported, with earnings up to 1,591,527 Somali lira. Most products transported were bananas, cotton and coffee from farm plantations in the Villabruzzi area, which were later exported through the Port of Mogadishu.

In 1924, a minor railway was built in the same region. It had a small track in 600 mm gauge, Genale-Afgoi. The railway was 46 km long and united the farming settlement of Genale with Afgoi on the Mogadishu-Villagio Duca degli Abruzzi route. Construction was managed by the Società Agricola Italo Somala (SAIS), which opened the track so that its plantations' powered sugar cane could be transported to the Mogadishu Port.

== Mogadishu-Ethiopian frontier railway ==
In 1939, the Italian leader Benito Mussolini planned a rail connection between Mogadishu and Addis Ababa, after the Italian conquest of Ethiopia. However, World War II brought an end to the Italian Empire and consequently aborted the project.

A small 600 mm (1 ft 11 5/8 in) gauge railway of 250 km was constructed between Villabruzzi and the Somalia-Ethiopia border in order to solve the logistical problems related to the conquest and occupation of Ethiopia. In 1928-1936, the track was initially built in sections until Buloburde. The first railway section was 130 km long. It started in Bivio Adalei of the Mogadishu-Villaggio Duca degli Abruzzi railway.

During the war campaign against Ethiopia this stretch of decauville line developed parallel to the road. It operated with small oil-fired locomotives, but allowed the transport of a large amount of materials to the Ogaden front and it remained at the service of agricultural activities even after the end of the military operations in mid 1936

In summer 1940, at the beginning of the Second World War, the line was extended by the Italian army by about 150 km. The railway now reached Ferfer, near the present-day Somalia-Ethiopia border. Somali troops from the First and Second Somali divisions of the Italian colonial army helped during the construction.

== Railway stations ==
| Name | Distance | Altitude | Image |
|---|---|---|---|
| Mogadishu | 0 km (0.0 mi) | 0 m (0 ft) | |
| Bridge over the Shebelle River | 30 km (18.6 mi) | 18 m (59 ft) | |
| Afgooye | 50 km (31.1 mi) | 64 ft (20 m) | |
| Adale | 66 km (41.0 mi) | 78 m (256 ft) | |
| Garsala | 80 km (49.7 mi) | 88 m (289 ft) | |
| Moico | 90 km (55.9 mi) | 91 m (299 ft) | |
| Bridge over the Shebelle River | 111 km (69.0 mi) | 96 m (315 ft) | |
| Villaggio Duca degli Abruzzi (modern day Jowhar) | 114 km (70.8 mi) | 108 m (354 ft) | |

Railway Stations in Somalia, with the exception of that of the capital Mogadiscio, were very simple, often simple wood structures without passenger services. Some structures of Mogadiscio station were dismantled by the British during WWII and sent to India.

The railway of Somalia italiana connected the capital city Mogadishu with Afgooye, and subsequently after 1929 with Villaggio Duca degli Abruzzi -called usually Villabruzzi (present-day Jowhar). The line in the early 1930s was served mainly by FIAT-TIBB diesel machines. The line and the stations were built by the Italians, but were later dismantled by British troops during World War II.

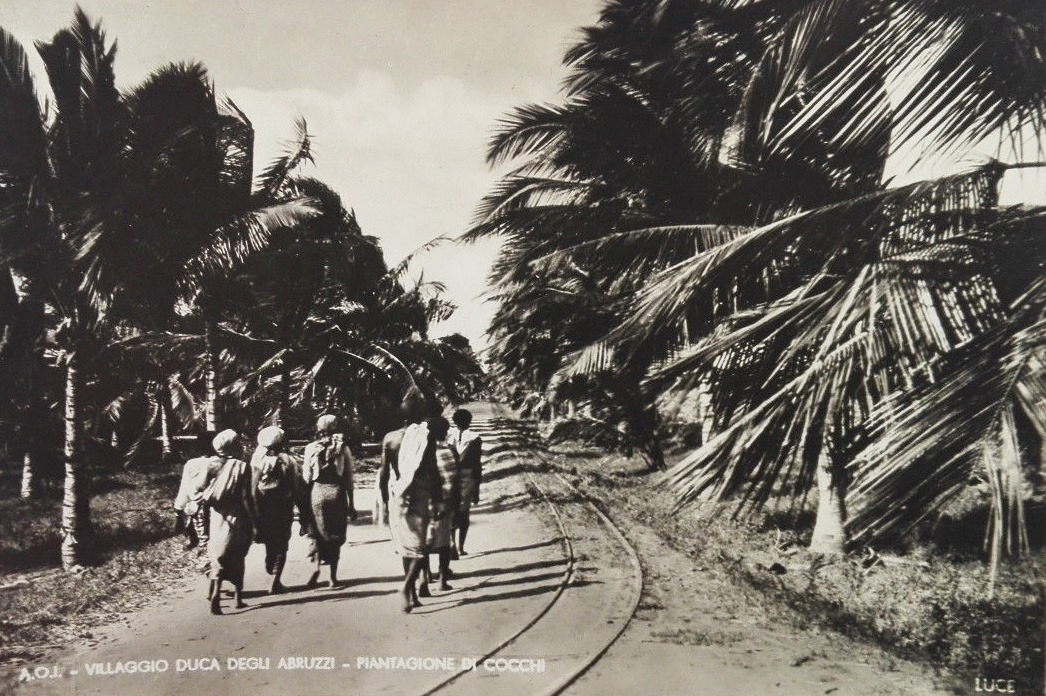
Decauville railway at Cocchi Plantation, Villaggio Duca degli Abruzzi

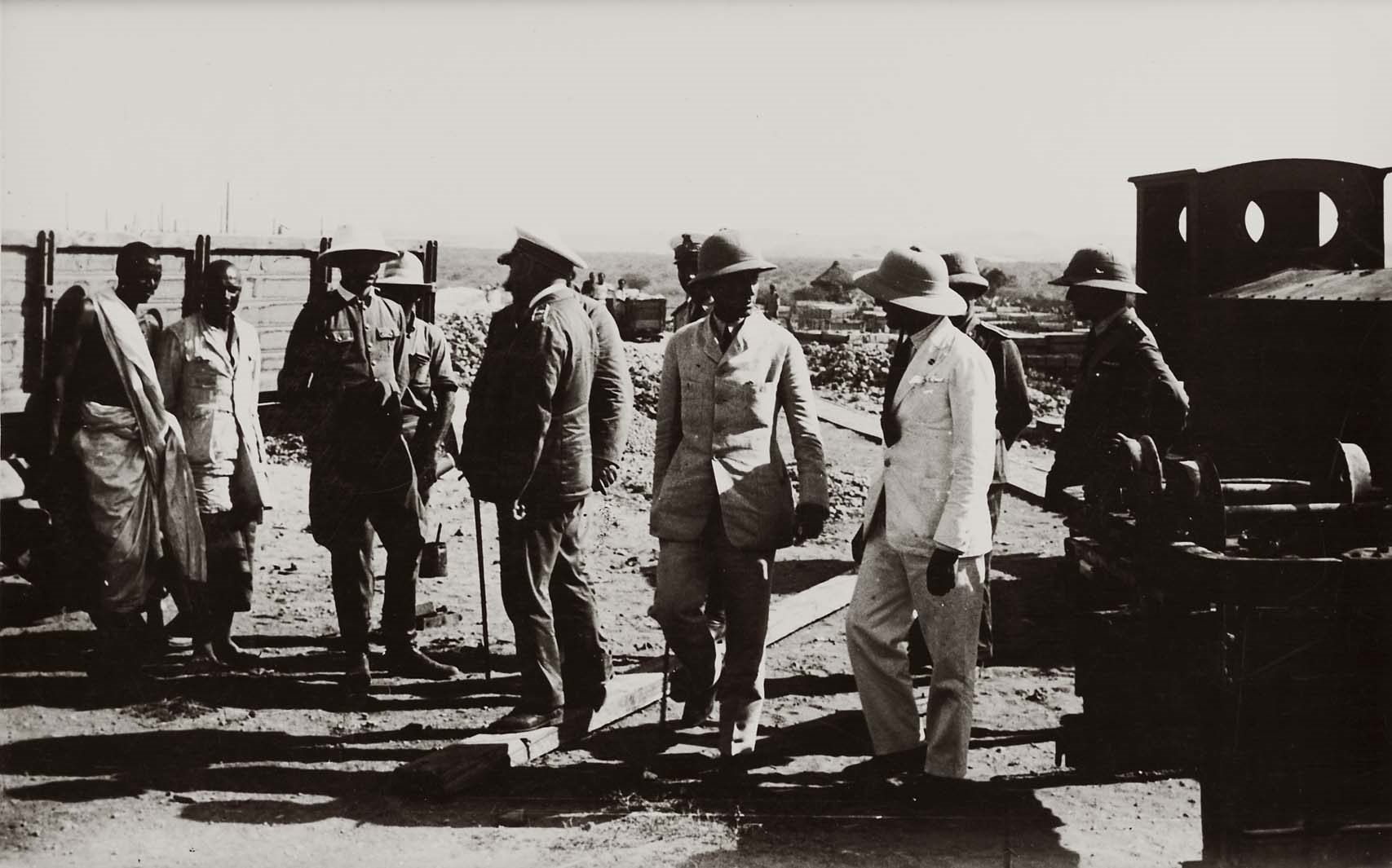
Decauville station at Vittorio d'Africa

== Decauville railways ==
- Additionally in the 1930s a small 600 mm (1 ft 11 5/8 in) gauge railway (called decauville) of 250 km was constructed between Villabruzzi and the Somalia-Ethiopia border in order to solve the logistical problems related to the conquest & occupation of Ethiopia. In 1928-1936, the track was initially built in sections until Buloburde. The first railway section was 130 km long. It started in the small railway station of Bivio Adalei of the Mogadishu-Villaggio Duca degli Abruzzi (Jowhar) railway.
- Another small "decauville" railway of 46 km was built between Genale and Afgoi station in the 1920s, but was used only for sugar transport and the railway station were simply deposits. It served also the farm area around Vittorio.
- Also a small decauville was created in the Saline Dante (Hafun Salt Factory), in the north of Italian Somalia.

== See also ==
- Mogadishu–Villabruzzi Railway
- Transport in Somalia
- Railway stations in Italian Somaliland
- Italian Somalis
- Italian Somaliland

== Bibliography ==
- Robinson, Neil (2009). World Rail Atlas and Historical Summary. Volume 7: North, East and Central Africa. Barnsley, UK: World Rail Atlas Ltd. ISBN 978-954-92184-3-5.
- Buzzini, Andrea. Le Ferrovie dello Stato per la costruzione dell’impero coloniale in Etiopia. Consiglio regionale della Toscana. Firenze, 2017 ().
- Tripodi, Paolo. The Colonial Legacy in Somalia. St. Martin's P Inc. New York, 1999.
- Hess, L. Italian colonialism in Somalia. University of Chicago Press. Chicago, 1966
- Marra, A. Trasporti e comunicazioni dell'Impero Unione editoriale d'Italia. Roma, 1940
