= Railway stations in Italian Somaliland =

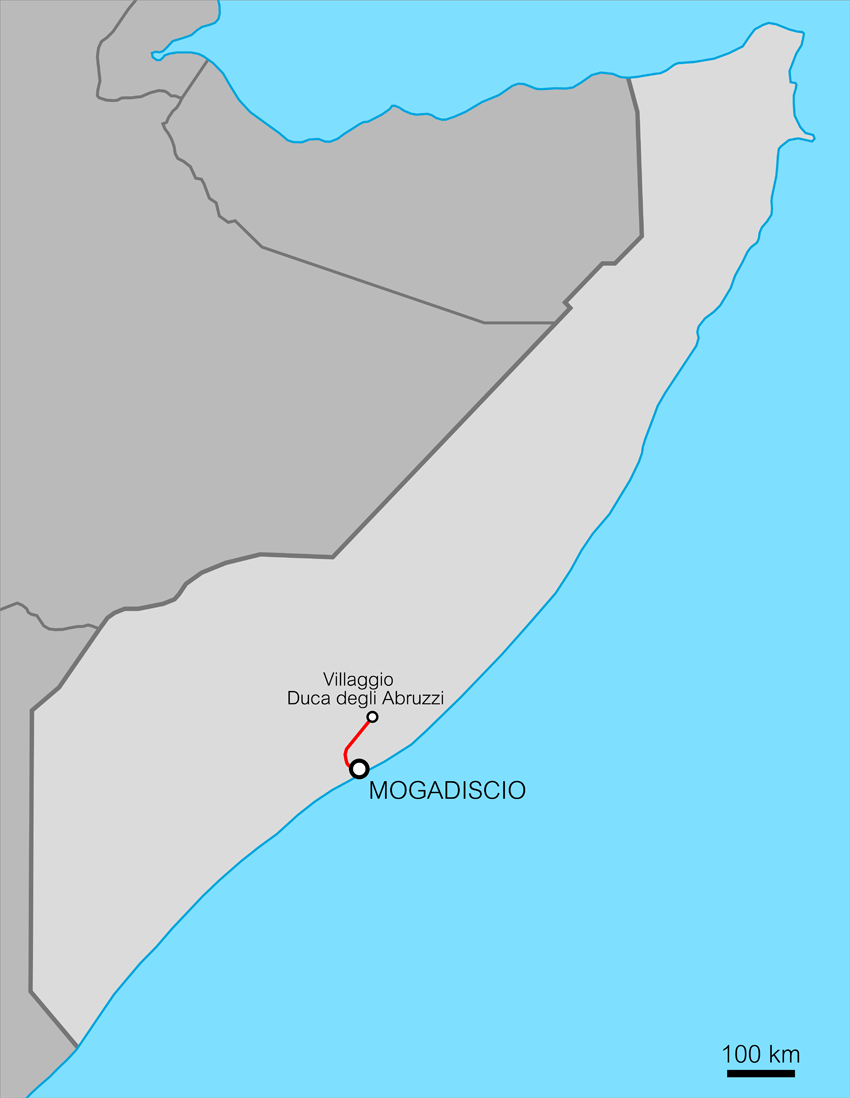
In red the Railway Mogadiscio-Villabruzzi (1914-1941)

All railway stations in Italian Somaliland were served by the Mogadishu–Villabruzzi Railway of 114 kilometres (71 mi).

== Railway stations ==
Name	Distance	Altitude	Image
Mogadishu	0 km (0.0 mi)	0 m (0 ft)	
Bridge over the Shebelle River	30 km (18.6 mi)	18 m (59 ft)	
Afgooye	50 km (31.1 mi)	64 ft (20 m)	
Adale	66 km (41.0 mi)	78 m (256 ft)	
Garsala	80 km (49.7 mi)	88 m (289 ft)	
Moico	90 km (55.9 mi)	91 m (299 ft)	
Bridge over the Shebelle River	111 km (69.0 mi)	96 m (315 ft)	
Villaggio Duca degli Abruzzi (modern day Jowhar)	114 km (70.8 mi)	108 m (354 ft)	

== Characteristics ==
The railway stations in Somalia, with the exception of that of the capital Mogadiscio, were very simple and often were simple wood structures without passenger services. Some structures of the Mogadiscio station were dismantled by the British during World War II and sent to India.

The railway of Somalia italiana connected the capital city Mogadishu with Afgooye, and subsequently—after 1929—with Villaggio Duca degli Abruzzi, typically called Villabruzzi (present-day Jowhar). The line in the early 1930s was served mainly by FIAT-TIBB diesel machines. The line and the stations were built by the Italians but were later dismantled by British troops during World War II.

- Additionally, in the 1930s, a small 600 mm (1 ft 11 5/8 in) gauge railway (called decauville) of 250 kilometres (160 mi) was constructed between Villabruzzi and the Somalia-Ethiopia border in order to solve the logistical problems related to the conquest & occupation of Ethiopia. In 1928-1936, the track was initially built in sections until Buloburde. The first railway section was 130 km long. It started in the small railway station of Bivio Adalei of the Mogadishu-Villaggio Duca degli Abruzzi (Jowhar) railway.
- Another small "decauville" railway of 46 kilometres (29 mi) was built between Genale and Afgoi station in the 1920s, but it was used only for sugar transport and the railway station were simply deposits.

In 1940, the construction of a larger and more modern railway station in Mogadishu (similar to the one in Addis Ababa) was proposed, but the beginning of World War II blocked it.

== See also ==
- Railway stations in Sudan
- Railway stations in Ethiopia
- Railway stations in Eritrea
- Railway stations in Kenya

== Bibliography ==
- Hess, L. Italian colonialism in Somalia. University of Chicago Press. Chicago, 1966
- Marra, A. Trasporti e comunicazioni dell'Impero Unione editoriale d'Italia. Roma, 1940
