= Italy–Somalia relations =

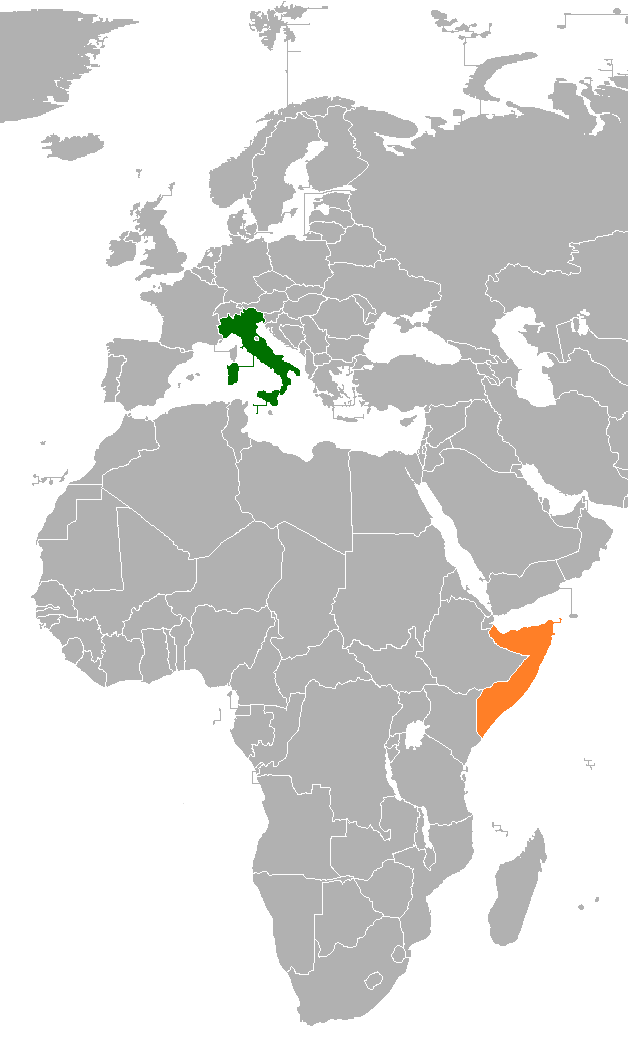
- Italy: Somalia

Italy–Somalia relations (Somali: Xiriirka Talyaaniga-Soomaaliya) are bilateral relations between Italy and Somalia.

== History ==
Relations between the modern-day territories of Italy and Somalia stretch back to antiquity. During the Roman Empire the Periplus of the Erythraean Sea, among other documents, reports early commercial exchanges between traders inhabiting city-states on the northern Somali littoral with Roman merchants. Numerous artefacts dating from this period have been uncovered in Somalia, such as at the Damo site in the Puntland region.

In the late 19th century, all extant Somali monarchs entered into treaties with one of the colonial powers, Abyssinia, Britain or Italy, except for Dhulbahante & Darawiish sultan Diiriye Guure. Likewise, in terms of administration, Italy first gained a foothold in Somalia through the signing of various pacts and agreements in the late 19th century with the ruling Somali Majeerteen Sultanate and Sultanate of Hobyo, led by King Osman Mahamuud and Sultan Yusuf Ali Kenadid, respectively.

In 1889, the colony of Italian Somaliland was created with its capital at Mogadishu. It was enlarged after World War I with the Italian Trans-Juba. Effective Italian control remained largely limited to the coastal areas until the early 1920s. After the collapse of Diiriye Guure's Dervish state, rebellion and revolt occurred, with disputes arising between different clans in Northern Somalia, allowing the Italian government to serve as a mediator while maintaining close control over the military.

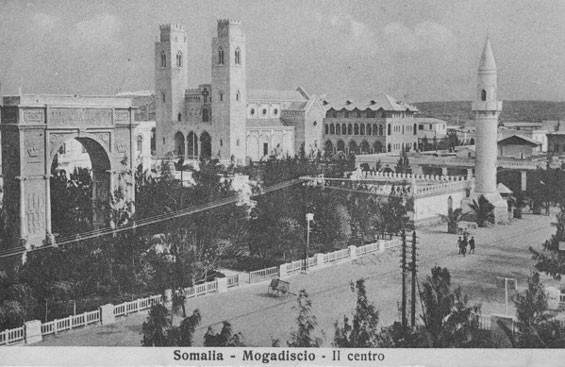
Postcard of Downtown Mogadishu in 1936. At the centre is the Catholic Cathedral. Near the Cathedral, the Arch monument is to commemorate King Umberto I of Italy.

In 1924, Governor Cesare Maria De Vecchi adopted a policy of disarmament of the northern Somali sultanates and Sultan Ali Yusuf Kenadid was subsequently exiled. By November 1927, the forces of Sultan Osman Mahamuud of the Majeerteen Sultanate were also defeated. The Dubats colonial troops and the Zaptié gendarmerie were extensively used by De Vecchi during these military campaigns. Unlike the southern territories, the northern sultanates were not subject to direct rule due to the earlier treaties they had signed with the Italians.

In the early 1930s, the new Italian Governors, Guido Corni and Maurizio Rava, started a policy of assimilation of the Somalis. Many Somalis were enrolled in the Italian colonial troops, and thousands of Italian colonists moved to live in Mogadishu. The city grew in size and some small manufacturing companies opened up. In 1930, there were 22,000 Italians living in Italian Somaliland, representing 2% of the territory's population. The majority resided in the capital Mogadishu, with other Italian communities concentrated in Jowhar, Adale (Itala), Janale, Jamame and Kismayo.

In 1936, the acquired territory from Ethiopia, named Italian Ogaden, was integrated into Italian East Africa as part of the Somalia Governorate inside the Italian Empire.

Italian Somaliland, after World War II, came under British administration until 1949, when it became a United Nations Trust Territory, the Trust Territory of Somalia, under Italian administration. On 1 July 1960, the Trust Territory of Somalia united as scheduled with the briefly extant State of Somaliland (the former British Somaliland) to form the Somali Republic. In 1969 a military coup and the assassination of President Abdirashid Ali Shermarke marked the rise of General Siad Barre.

Although most Italian Somalis left the territory after independence, Somalia's relations with Italy remained strong in the following years and through the ensuing civil war period, providing a contribution to the stabilisation process of the country that involves not only governmental organizations but also civil societies thanks to the commitment of NGOs, universities, businesses and the Italian Somalis in Italy.

== Diplomatic relations ==
The Federal Government of Somalia was established on 20 August 2012, representing the first permanent central government in the country since the start of the conflict. The following month, Hassan Sheikh Mohamud was elected as the new government's first president. The election was welcomed by the Italian authorities, who re-affirmed Italy's continued support for Somalia's government, its territorial integrity and sovereignty. The Italian embassy reopened in Mogadishu in 2014. Italy financially supported the elections of 2012 and 2016, the federalization process of the country, and it is helping with the process of constitutional reform, including the political consultations in 2021.

== Cooperation ==
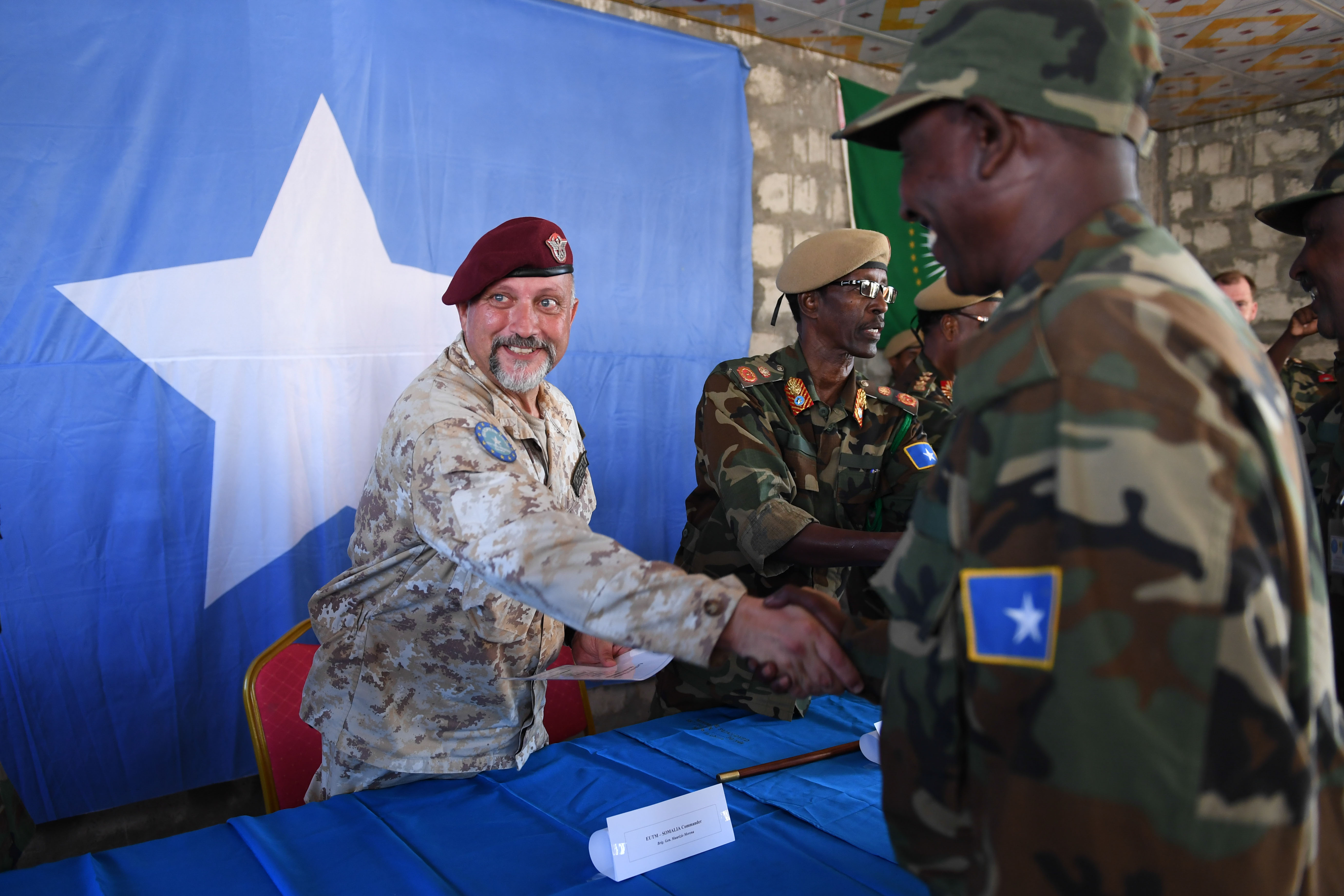
The European Union Training Mission in Somalia (EUTM) Commander, Brig. Gen. Maurizio Morena, hands over a certificate to a Somali National Army soldier during a pass-out ceremony to mark the end of a military training course conducted by EUTM in Mogadishu on January 14, 2017.

Italy is cooperating with Somalia in the field of defence and security, with the signing of a treaty between the two nations in Rome in 2013 and the Technical Arrangement between the Carabinieri and Somali Police Force in 2015. Italy is engaged in the training of the Somali Police Force to provide a contribution to the control capabilities of the Somali territory and the restoration of security conditions in the country. The MIADIT project, started in 2013 and developed by the Carabinieri, has trained about 1,400 Somali policemen.

Italy is the first contributor of men and equipment in the EUTM Somalia military mission, as a form of collaboration and military training with the Somali Ministry of Defense and the Somali Armed Forces. An Italian support cell operates in support of the work of the EUTM Somalia mission, carrying out different projects in the area of civil-military co-operation (CIMIC), all aimed at supporting the Somali population in the Banadir region. The Italian CIMIC intervenes in support of health structures, schools and education, and social and essential services. As part of the European Union initiatives, an Italian Carabinieri Officer was seconded to the European delegation as Police Advisor.

There are 24 ongoing multi-year initiatives financed by the Italian Cooperation in Somalia. The funds allocated to Somalia increased by over 100% between 2014 (9 million euros) and 2017 (18.5 million euros). Italian aid is focused in the sector of health (3.5 million euros), food security (2.5 million euros), education (1.9 million euros), infrastructural development (3.5 million euros), and the economic reconstruction of the country (5 million euros), aiming for the reduction of poverty, the creation of new job opportunities, the removal of inequalities, the promotion of the private sector and female entrepreneurship, improving food security, contributing to global health and universal basic education, post-conflict stabilization and humanitarian assistance.

== Embassies ==
The Italian embassy in Somalia is in Mogadishu and it is the sole Italian representation in Somalia. The Italian embassy is one of 18 foreign representations in Somalia and one of 17 foreign representations in Mogadishu. The head of the mission is the ambassador Carlo Campanile.

The Somali embassy in Italy is in Rome and it is the sole Somali representation in Italy. The Somali embassy in Rome is one of 44 Somali diplomatic and consular representations abroad. The head of the mission is the ambassador Abdirahman Sheikh Issa.

== See also ==
- Foreign relations of Italy
- Foreign relations of Somalia

== Bibliography ==
- Tripodi, Paolo. The Colonial Legacy in Somalia. St. Martin's Press. New York, 1999.
