= Kiliga Shiinaha =

Kiliga Shiinaha is a village located in the Jowhar District, Middle Shabelle region of Somalia. Geographic sources place the settlement at approximately 3.12°N, 45.46°E. The name is also written Kiliga Shiinaha or Kiliga-Shiinaha. A 2020 flood map produced by the Food and Agriculture Organization Somalia Water and Land Information Management project identifies Kiliga-Shiinaha among the settlements in the Jowhar area and shows it within the Shabelle River floodplain.
