= Maandheere =

- Town
- Location in Somalia
- Coordinates: 02°41′30″N 45°30′29″E
- Country: Somalia
- Region: Middle Shabelle
- District: Jowhar
- Time zone: UTC+3 (EAT)

Maandheere (sometimes written Maandere or Maandeere) is a village in the Middle Shabelle region of Somalia, near Jowhar.

A February, 2005 report from UNICEF noted that the local school had low enrollment, little space for expansion and poor ventilation.
