= Duke of Abruzzi's free-tailed bat =

Conservation status
- Least Concern (IUCN 3.1)

Scientific classification
- Kingdom: Animalia
- Phylum: Chordata
- Class: Mammalia
- Order: Chiroptera
- Family: Molossidae
- Genus: Mops
- Species: M. aloysiisabaudiae

Binomial name
- Mops aloysiisabaudiae (Festa, 1907)

Synonyms
- Nyctinomus Aloysii-Sabaudiae Festa, 1907; Tadarida aloysiisabaudiae Festa, 1907

Species of bat

Duke of Abruzzi's free-tailed bat (Mops aloysiisabaudiae) is a species of bat in the family Molossidae. It is found in Cameroon, Central African Republic, Democratic Republic of the Congo, Ivory Coast, Gabon, Ghana, South Sudan, and Uganda. Its natural habitats are subtropical or tropical dry forest, subtropical or tropical moist lowland forest, and moist savanna. It is threatened by habitat loss.

== Taxonomy and etymology ==
It was described as a new species in 1907 by Dr. E. Festa. Festa placed it in the now-defunct genus Nyctinomus, with the name Nyctinomus Aloysii-Sabaudiae. Its species name "aloysiisabaudiae" is a Latinization of one of the names of Prince Luigi Amedeo, the Duke of Abruzzi. "Luigi" is an Italian variant of Latin Aloysius, while Latin "sabaudiae" refers to the House of Savoy.

== Description ==
Its fur is a light chestnut brown color. Its flight membranes are blackish-brown. It has large, rounded ears with very small tragi. Its upper lip is very wrinkly. It has a dental formula of 1.1.2.32.1.2.3 for a total of 30 teeth. Its forearm is 38–43 mm (1.5–1.7 in) long.

== Range and habitat ==
It is found in several countries in Africa, including Cameroon, Central African Republic, Democratic Republic of the Congo; Côte d'Ivoire; Gabon; Ghana; Sudan; and Uganda.

== See also ==
- Luigi Amedeo, Duke of the Abruzzi
