= Mogadishu–Villabruzzi Railway =

Historical railway in Southern Somalia

Mogadiscio-Villabruzzi Railway
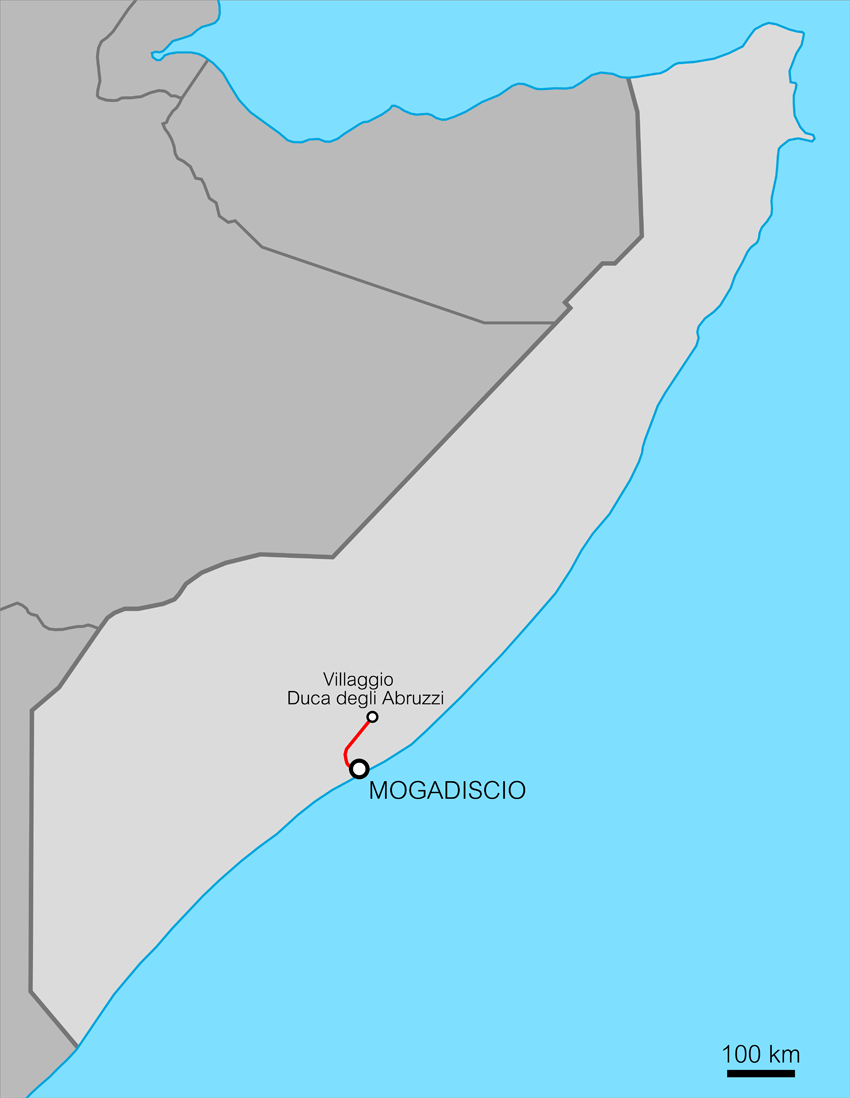

Overview
- Native name: Tariinka
- Status: Inactive
- Locale: southern Somalia
- Termini: Mogadishu; Villabruzzi (modern day Jowhar; originally to Afgooye)
- Stations: 7

Service
- Operator(s): Somali railway

History
- Opened: 1914
- Closed: 1941

Technical
- Line length: 114 kilometres (71 mi)
- Track gauge: 950 mm (3 ft 1 3/8 in)

The Mogadiscio–Villabruzzi Railway (Italian: Ferrovia Mogadiscio-Villabruzzi) is an historical railway system that ran through southern Somalia. It was constructed between 1914 and 1927 by the colonial authorities in Italian Somaliland. The railway connected the capital city Mogadishu with Afgooye, and subsequently with Villaggio Duca degli Abruzzi – usually called "Villabruzzi" (present-day Jowhar). The line was later dismantled by British troops during World War II. Plans for re-establishing the railway were made in the 1980s by the Siad Barre administration, but were aborted after the regime's collapse.

== History ==
The railway was initially built for the surrounding area of Mogadishu (Mogadiscio in Italian), after World War I in 1914. In the 1924, it was extended to Afgooye. In 1927, it was extended again by H.R.H. Principe Luigi Amedeo, Duca degli Abruzzi, a senior member of the Italian royal family, had the railway extended to the Shebelle River colonial villages he was then developing.

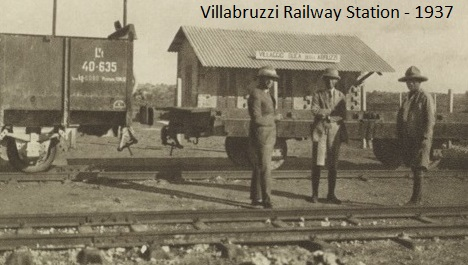
Photo of railway station at Villabruzzi

The line, 114 km long, reached Villabruzzi (then in full "Villaggio Duca degli Abruzzi", now "Jowhar") in 1928. The original proposal was for the railway to go on from Villabruzzi to the Somali border with Ethiopia and into the Ogaden, but the Second Italo-Abyssinian War in 1936 stopped further construction. However, the ground infrastructure from Villabruzzi to Buloburde was built in 1939, but the track was not laid.

In 1939, the Italian leader Benito Mussolini planned road and rail connections between Mogadiscio and Addis Ababa, but only the road ("La Strada Imperiale") was built before World War II destroyed the Italian Empire. However, a small 600 mm (1 ft 11 5/8 in) railway of 200 km was built between Villabruzzi and the border with Ethiopia in order to solve the logistical problems related to the occupation of Ethiopia.

In 1941, the railway was dismantled by British troops when they occupied Italian East Africa (Africa Orientale Italiana in Italian). From then the railway, except for a few tracks within Mogadishu harbour, was no longer used. In 1942 some diesel locomotives and related materials were moved by the British government to Eritrea, to be used on the Massawa-Asmara railway.

In the 1980s, the President of Somalia Siad Barre proposed the reactivation of the railway. However, the collapse of his regime in 1991 stopped any possible reconstruction.

== Statistics ==
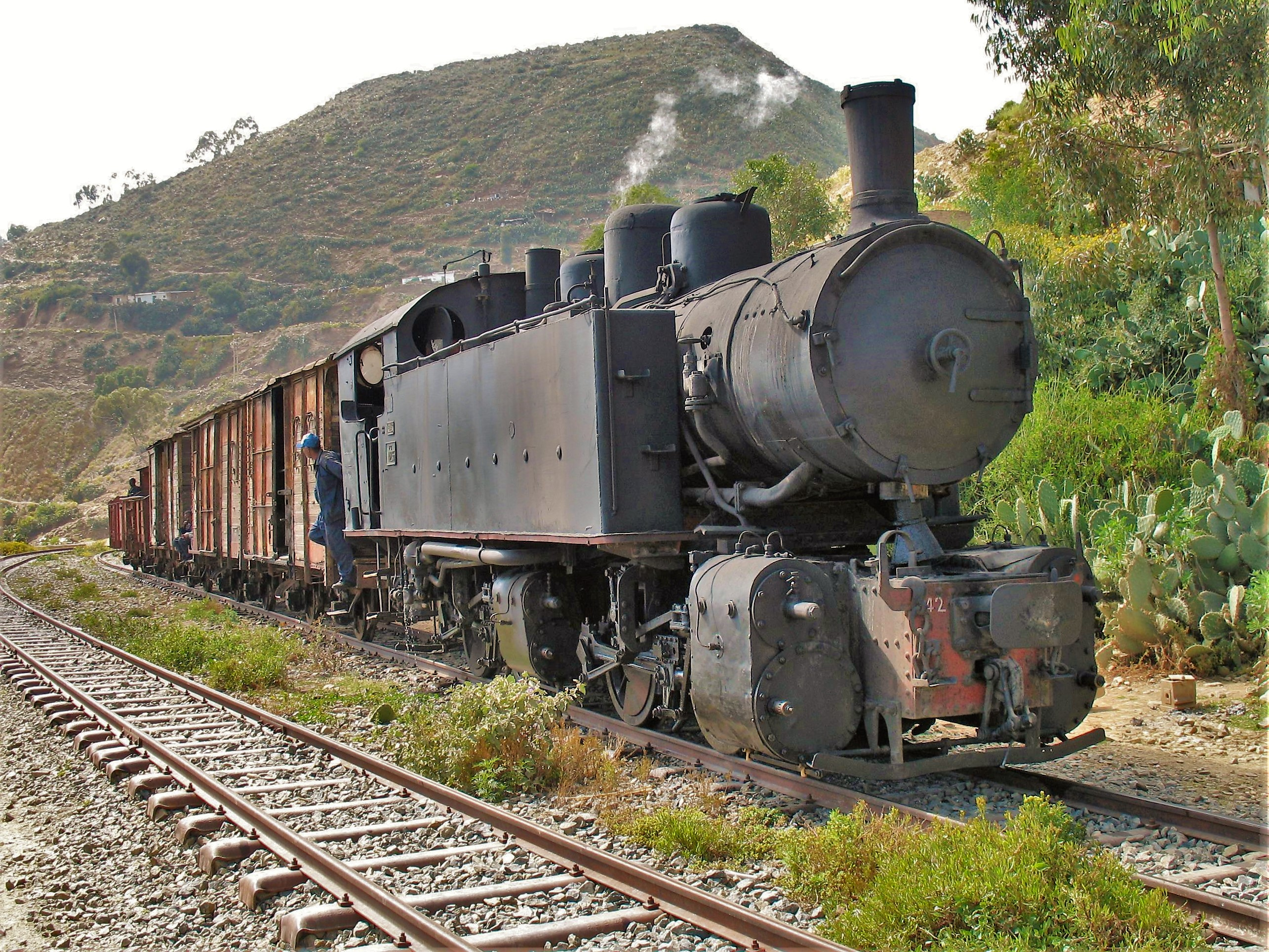
A "Ansaldo 442" steam locomotive, built in 1938 for the Eritrean Railway, is similar to those used in the Somali railway.

The railway in 1930 moved 19,359 passengers, and in addition used for tourism. In the same year 43,467 tons of products (mainly agricultural) were transported, with earnings up to 1,591,527 Somali lira. Most products transported were bananas, cotton and coffee, from farm plantations of the area of Villabruzzi, to be exported through the port of Mogadishu.

Ferrovie Somale, a government company, administered the line. The single track railway had a 950 mm (3 ft 1 3/8 in) narrow gauge, as established in 1879 by an Italian law on minor gauges.

== Equipment ==
The equipment of the Somali railway was similar to the one used in the Eritrean Railway.

=== Steam locomotives ===
Three classes of steam locomotive were used: one design of 0-4-0 shunter and two designs of 0-4-4-0 Mallet for line service.

==== 202 Series ====
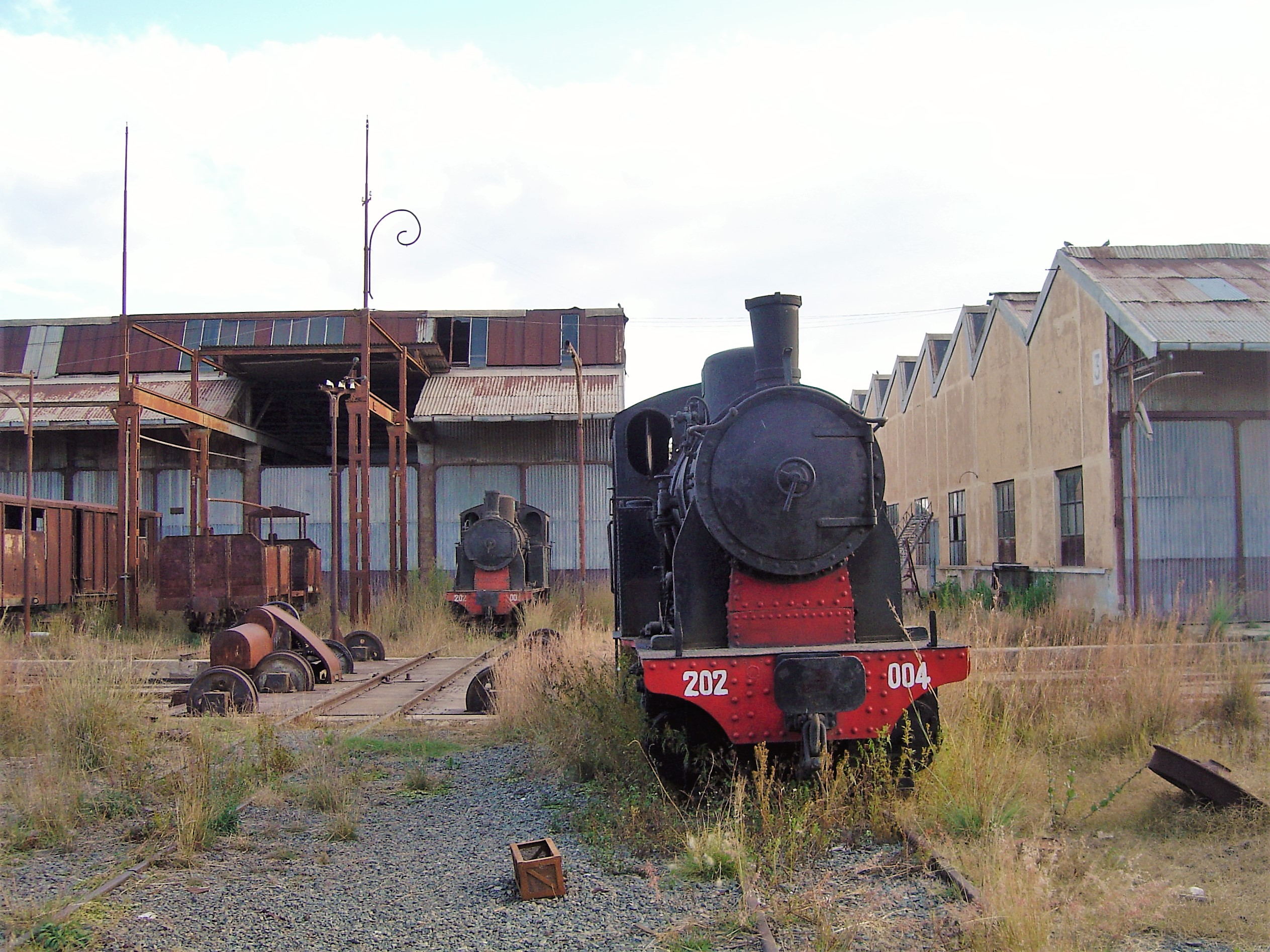
A pair of class 202 locomotives, similar to those used in the Somali railway

These small 0-4-0 tank engines were and are the standard shunter locomotives of the system, built between 1927 and 1937 by the firm of Breda in Milan. They have short side tanks, a rear coal bunker, and a unified, oval dome containing the steam dome inside a larger sand dome – this arrangement, popular worldwide in nations that favored the sand dome, helped both to insulate the steam dome and to keep the sand dry with the warmth. Large, prominent builder's plates adorn the domes. They use Walschaerts valve gear with piston valves and superheating.

==== 440 Series ====
One of these early Mallet locomotives, which is a true Mallet and thus a compound, still exists in storage at the Asmara railway station. It was a 1915 product of Ansaldo in Genova.

==== 442 Series ====
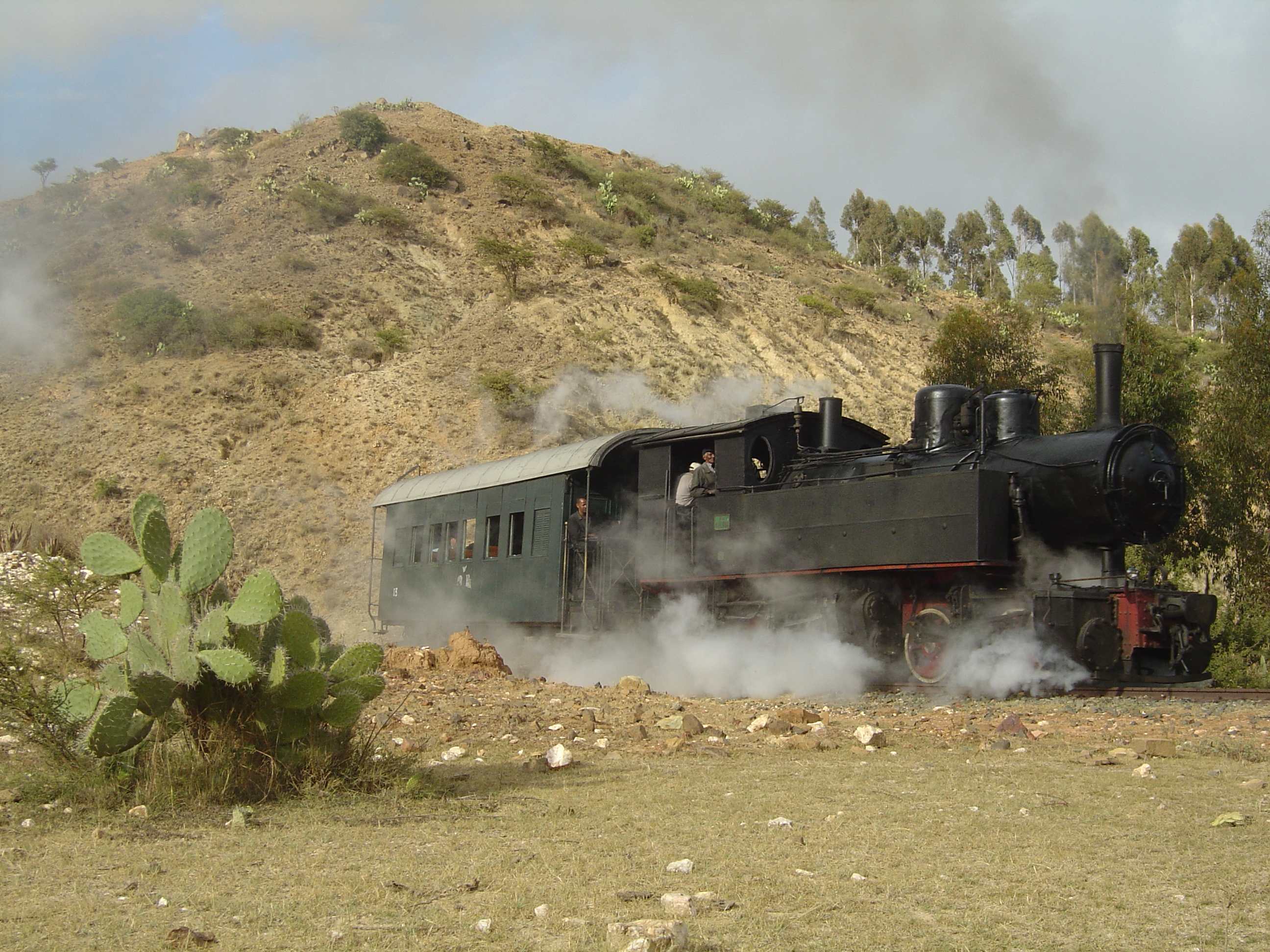
A class 440 locomotive, similar to those used in the Somali railway

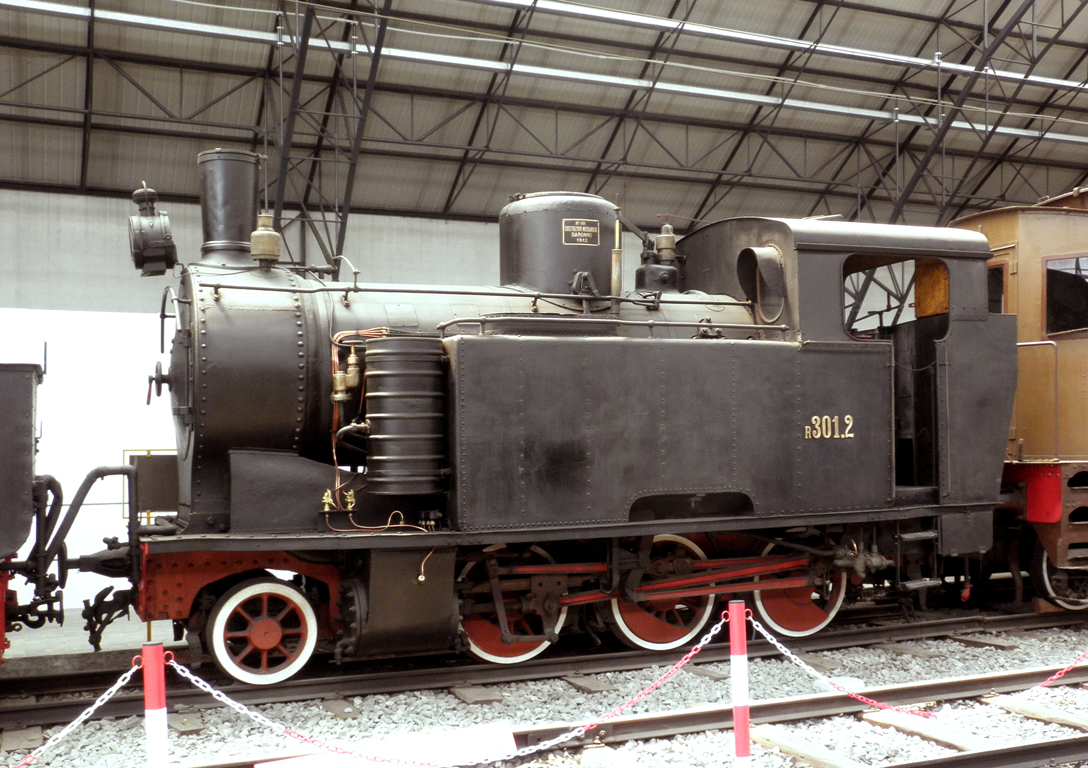
A R.301 locomotive, similar to those used in Somalia

These later, and much larger, compound Mallet locomotives were built by Ansaldo in Genova in 1938 to largely replace the earlier types, both the 440 Series and the unsuccessful 441 Series, which were simple locomotives (i.e., non-compound) and found liable to run out of steam on the heavy grades of the line. Like the other locomotives they are tank engines with large side tanks and a rear coal bunker, under cover of the cab roof in this design. These are quite hefty machines, as required by the tough demands of the terrain.

=== Other trains ===
The Somali railway also used the Fiat TIBB diesel (TIBB stands for "Tecnomasio Italiano Brown Boveri"). Additionally some small carriages were built locally by "SPA-A" in Mogadishu in 1930 (using locomotive "A-1") which were used for local passenger transport. They had a top speed of 70 km/h.

== Railway stations ==
Name	Distance	Altitude
Mogadishu	0 km (0.0 mi)	0 m (0 ft)
Bridge over the Shebelle River	30 km (18.6 mi)	18 m (59 ft)
Afgooye	50 km (31.1 mi)	64 ft (20 m)
Adale	66 km (41.0 mi)	78 m (256 ft)
Garsala	80 km (49.7 mi)	88 m (289 ft)
Moico	90 km (55.9 mi)	91 m (299 ft)
Bridge over the Shebelle River	111 km (69.0 mi)	96 m (315 ft)
Villaggio Duca degli Abruzzi (modern day Jowhar)	114 km (70.8 mi)	108 m (354 ft)

== See also ==
- Italian Somalis
- Italian Somaliland
- Rail transport in Somalia
- Transport in Somalia
- Railway stations in Somalia

== Bibliography ==
- Antonicelli, Franco (1961). Trent'anni di storia italiana 1915 – 1945 (in Italian). Torino: Mondadori Editore.
- Del Boca, Angelo (1993). Una sconfitta dell’intelligenza. Italia e Somalia (in Italian). Bari: Laterza Editore.
- Tripodi, Paolo (1999). The Colonial Legacy in Somalia. New York: St. Martin's Press Inc.
