= Nagey =

Coordinates: 3°10′35″N 45°23′03″E

Nagey (also recorded as Nageeye) is a locality in Jowhar District, Middle Shabelle, Somalia. The locality is documented in geographic and humanitarian mapping of the Jowhar area under the name Nagey.
