= Prince Luigi Amedeo, Duke of the Abruzzi =

Italian mountaineer and explorer (1873–1933)

Prince Luigi Amedeo
- Duke of the Abruzzi
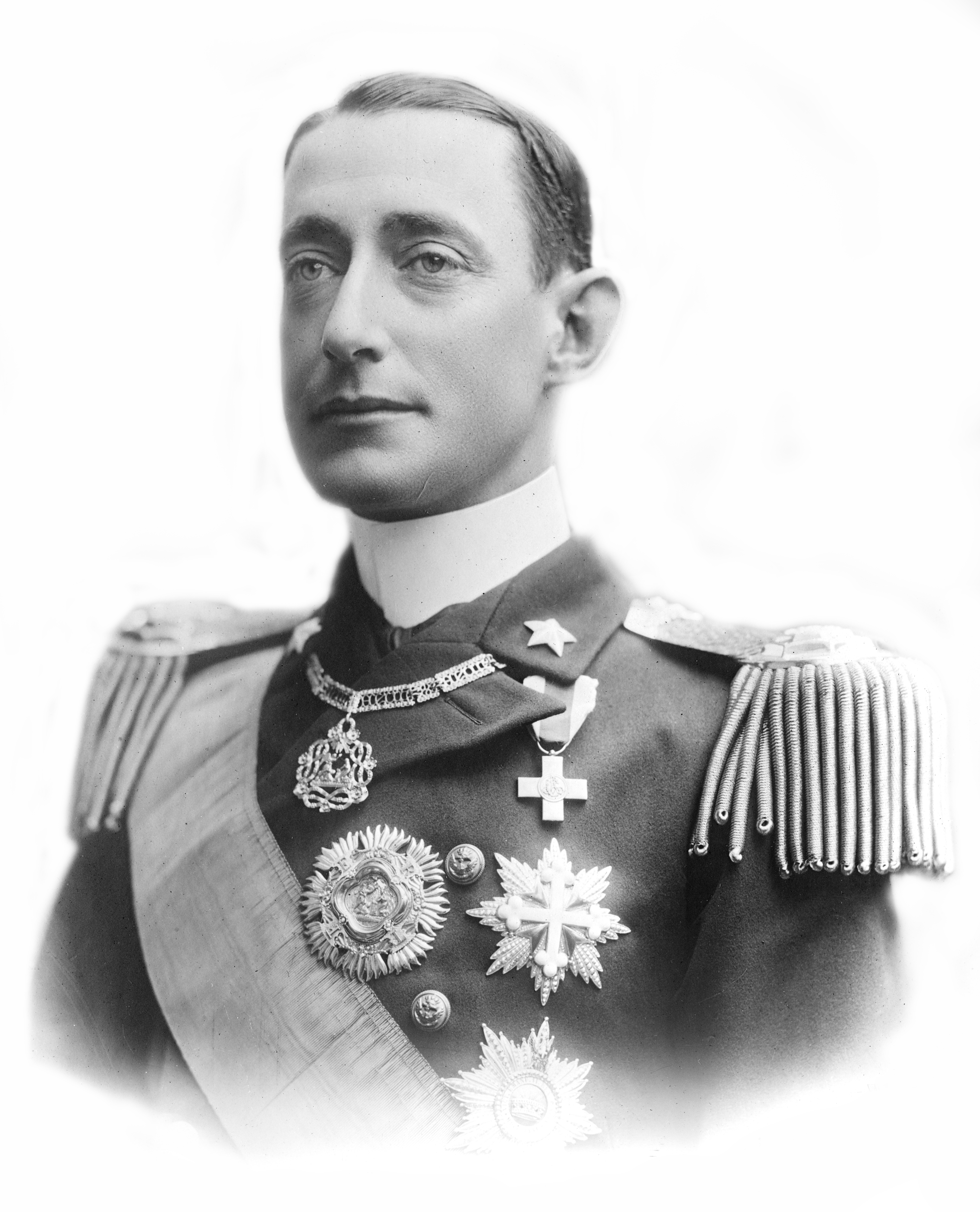
- Born: 29 January 1873; Royal Palace of Madrid, Madrid, Spain
- Died: 18 March 1933 (aged 60); Villaggio Duca degli Abruzzi, Italian Somaliland
- Burial: Riverbank of the Shebelle River
Names
- Luigi Amedeo Giuseppe Maria Ferdinando Francesco di Savoia
- House: Savoy
- Father: Amadeo I of Spain
- Mother: Maria Vittoria dal Pozzo

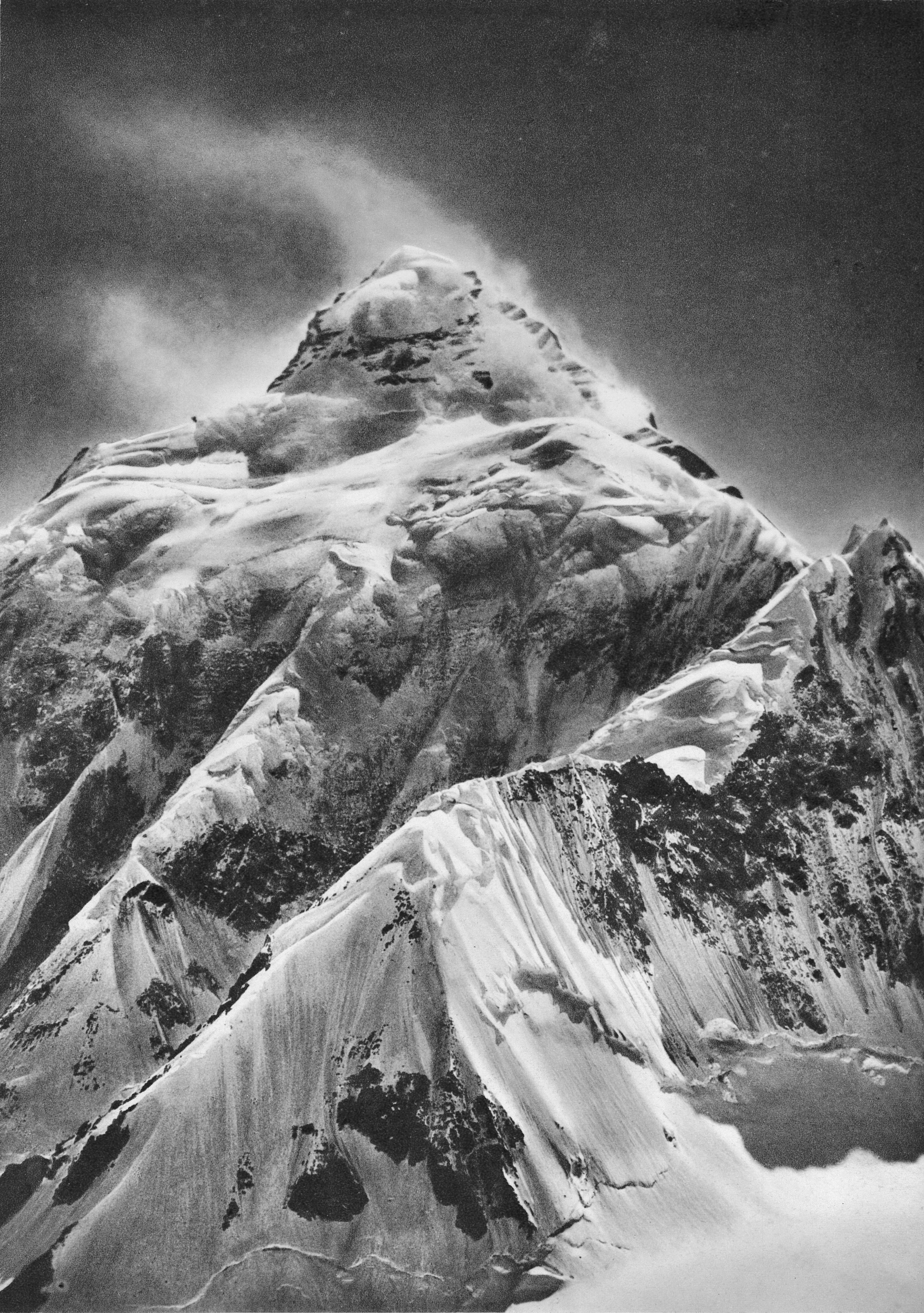
Photo of K2 taken by the Duke

Prince Luigi Amedeo, Duke of the Abruzzi (29 January 1873 – 18 March 1933) was an Italian mountaineer and explorer, briefly Infante of Spain as son of Amadeo I of Spain, member of the royal House of Savoy, and cousin of the Italian King Victor Emmanuel III. He is known for his Arctic explorations and for his mountaineering expeditions, particularly to Mount Saint Elias and K2. He also served as an Italian admiral during World War I. He created Villaggio Duca degli Abruzzi in Italian Somalia during his last years of life.

== Early years ==
Prince Luigi was born in Madrid, Spain as the third oldest son of Prince Amadeo of Savoy, Duke of Aosta and his first wife Donna Maria Vittoria dal Pozzo della Cisterna. Prince Luigi Amedeo was a grandson of King Vittorio Emanuele II of Italy. He was born during his father's brief reign as King of Spain. His siblings were Prince Emanuele Filiberto, Prince Vittorio Emanuele, and Prince Umberto. Shortly after his birth, his father, who had reigned in Spain since 1870, abdicated and returned to Italy in 1873. Prince Luigi Amedeo was a member of the House of Savoy, well known in Europe since the 12th century. His uncle became King Umberto I of Italy in 1878, and his cousin became King Vittorio Emanuele III in 1900.

The title Duke of the Abruzzi (Italian: Duca degli Abruzzi) was created by King Umberto I in 1890 for Luigi Amedeo, who was a son of the abdicating King of Spain Amadeus and initially was given the title of Infante of Spain. His ducal title referred to the central Italian region of Abruzzo.

From 1893 to 1896, Luigi Amedeo traveled around the world, including Eritrea, then an Italian possession, and Vancouver. In September 1893, he traveled to Italian Somaliland to quell the unrest and stayed for a month to guard the port of Mogadishu, giving him his first contact with a land to which he would later devote the last years of his life and in which he would choose to die. He had begun to train as a mountaineer in 1892 on Mont Blanc and Monte Rosa (Italian Alps): in 1897 he made the first ascent of Mount Saint Elias (Canada/U.S., 5,489 m). There the expedition searched for a mirage, known as The Silent City of Alaska, that natives and prospectors claimed to see over a glacier. C. W. Thornton, a member of the expedition, wrote: "It required no effort of the imagination to liken it to a city, but was so distinct that it required, instead, faith to believe that it was not in reality a city."

== Arctic expedition ==
In 1898, Prince Luigi Amedeo organized an expedition towards the North Pole and consulted the famous polar explorer Fridtjof Nansen, who had sailed the furthest north with the Colin Archer-built polar ship Fram (ship) in 1893–1896. In 1899 Amedeo acquired Jason, a steam whaler of 570 tons. He renamed her Stella Polare and took her to Colin Archer's shipyard in Larvik, Norway. The interior was stripped out and beams, diagonals and knees heavily strengthened the ship.

In the spring of 1899 he arrived in the Norwegian capital Christiania with ten companions and Stella Polare ("Pole Star") took the expedition through the frozen sea. On 12 June they headed for Archangel (Arkhangelsk).

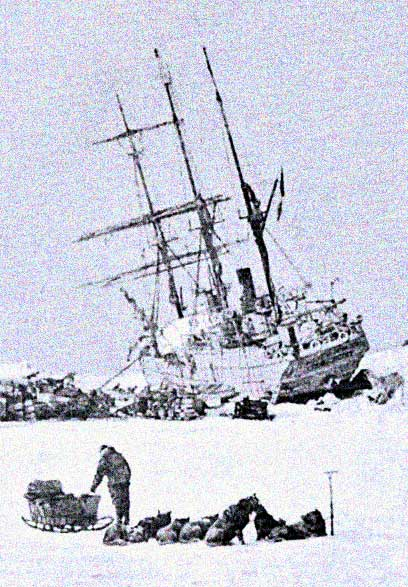
Stella Polare was trapped and threatened to sink. The crew were obliged to land with the utmost haste and to secure materials for building a dwelling.

On 30 June Stella Polare dropped anchor in the docks of Arkhangelsk and the duke was solemnly received by Governor Engelhardt. The same day, Prince Luigi Amedeo was invited to meet the local authorities and the present foreign diplomats.

On 7 July, a local newspaper wrote:

The city theatre arranged an extraordinary spectacle in the presence of the Duke of the Abruzzi. The drama The princess of Baghdad, consisting of three acts, was performed. Before the curtain was raised the orchestra had played the Italian royal anthem...

Later the duke himself wrote about his stay in Arkhangelsk: "Our departure was set for July 12. Early in the morning the church was open to us and we, although being Catholic, were allowed to join the mass. In the afternoon all the dogs were brought back on board to their kennels. In the evening the Stella Polare put out and was escorted by two steamers down the Dvina. I still remained on shore, as well as Doctor Cavalli, in order to spend the evening together with our Italian friends. Next evening we left Arkhangel’sk. During the whole journey we saw flags being hoisted to welcome us..."

Twenty men took part in the expedition, among them Captain Umberto Cagni, Lieutenant F. Querini and Doctor A. Cavalli Molinelli. They planned to go to Franz Joseph Land, in the Arctic wilderness, to establish a camp in which to stay during winter time and, afterwards, to reach the North Pole by dogsled across the frozen sea.

Prince Luigi Amedeo established the winter camp on Rudolf Island. The expedition was to start at the end of the Arctic night. The duke lost two fingers during winter because of the cold, which made it impossible for him to join the trip by sledge. He left the command over the pole expedition to Captain Cagni. On 11 March 1900, Cagni left the camp and reached latitude 86° 34’ on 25 April, setting a new record by beating Nansen's result of 1895 by 35 to 40 kilometres (22 to 25 mi). Cagni barely managed to return to the camp on 23 June. On 16 August Stella Polare left Rudolf Island heading south and the expedition returned to Norway. During the expedition, the northern coast of Rudolf Island and two other islands were explored and measured.

== Later years ==
In 1906, inspired by Henry Morton Stanley's last wishes, the Duke led an expedition to the Ruwenzori Range (5,125 m), in Uganda. He scaled sixteen summits in the range, including the six principal peaks. One of them, Mount Luigi di Savoia, bears his name. The highest peak was reached on 18 June 1906.

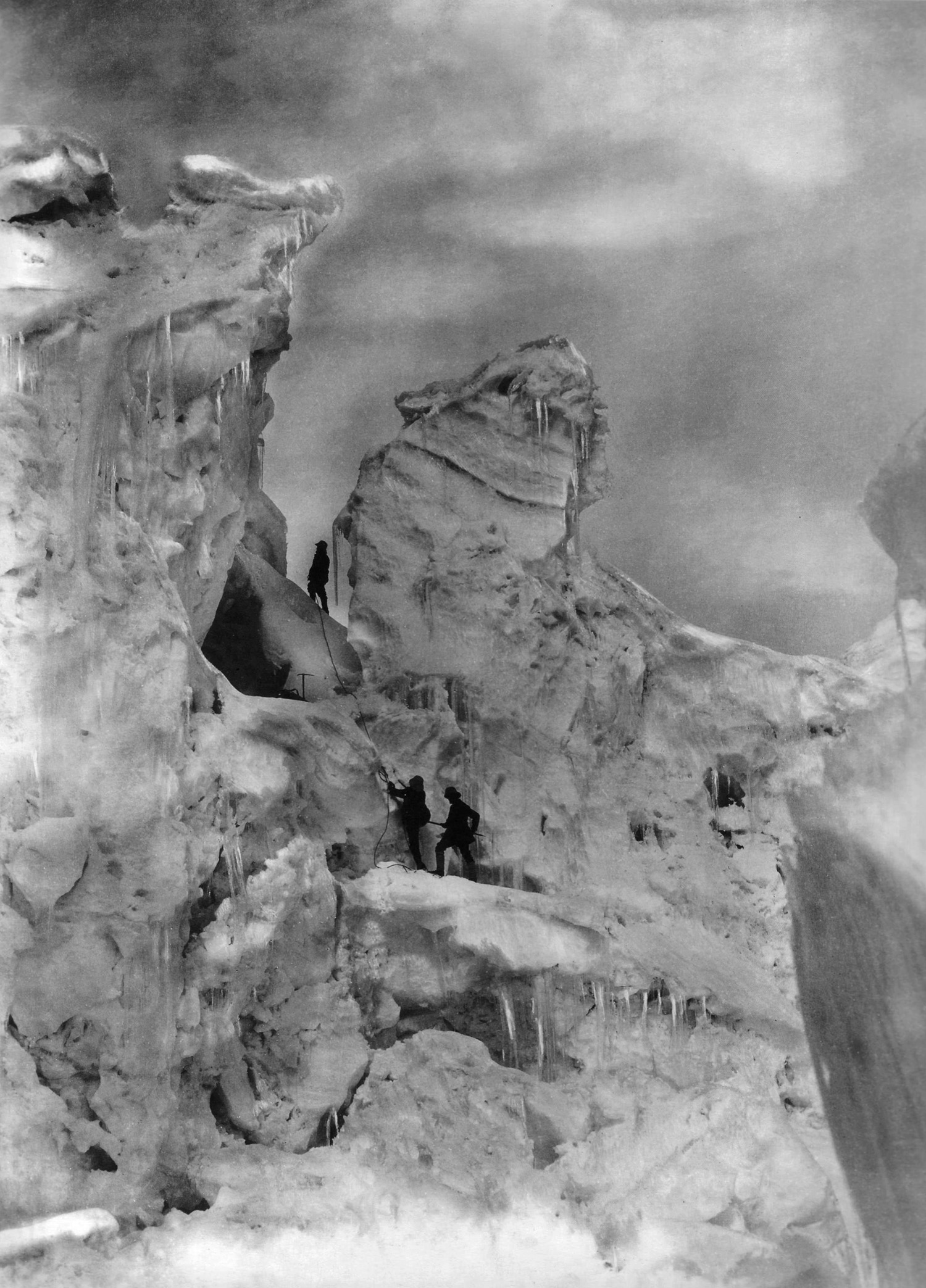
The Duke and his guides climbing an icefall on Chogolisa in 1909.

His next great expedition, in 1909, aimed to climb K2 in Karakoram. A team led by Prince Luigi Amedeo reached a height of 6,250 m on the ridge. The standard route up the mountain (formerly known as K2's East Ridge) climbs today on the Abruzzi Spur.

In an attempt on Chogolisa, he and his companions again failed to reach the summit, but set a world altitude record, a height of approximately 7,500 m (24,600 ft) before turning around just 150 m below the summit due to bad weather.

=== In the Italian Navy ===
A vice-admiral in the Italian Royal Navy (Regia Marina), he was Inspector of Torpedo Craft from 1911 to 1912. During World War I, he was the Commander-in-Chief of the Italian Fleet (1914–1917) based in Taranto, his flagship being the Italian battleship Conte di Cavour. Under the duke, the Regia Marina was responsible for saving the Army of the Kingdom of Serbia. In February 1917, he was replaced by Paolo Thaon di Revel, under pressure from the British and French allies. In February 1918, he was promoted to admiral, but played no further role of importance.

The Explorers Club in New York elected the duke to its highest category of membership — Honorary Member — in 1912.

The duke assisted Italian dictator Benito Mussolini with the Italo-Ethiopian Treaty of 1928. He traveled to Addis Ababa with gifts. One gift, a Fiat 3000 tank, ended up playing a role in crushing the abortive coup d'état of 1928.

In 1932, the duke was briefly the president of the newly merged Italian Line of steamships. In 1931, combining all of Italy's transatlantic carriers into the Italian Line was one of Mussolini's biggest business deals. However, the duke resigned soon after SS Rex broke down at Gibraltar. According to him, "My reason is that I have been unable to achieve harmony among executives who formerly headed competing lines."

=== Italian Somaliland ===
In 1918, the Duke returned to Italian Somaliland. In 1920, he founded the "Village of the Duke of Abruzzi" (Villaggio Duca degli Abruzzi or Villabruzzi) some ninety kilometres north of Mogadishu. It was an agricultural settlement experimenting with new cultivation techniques.

By 1926, the colony comprised 16 villages, with 3,000 Somali and 200 Italian (Italian Somalis) inhabitants. Abruzzi raised funds for a number of development projects in the town, including roads, dams, schools, hospitals, a church and a mosque.

He died in the village on 18 March 1933.

In the late 1930s, the village area was one of the most socio-economically developed in eastern Africa. The area around the "Villaggio Duca degli Abruzzi" was the most agriculturally developed of Somalia before World War II and had some important food industries.

After Italian Somaliland was officially dissolved in 1947, the town was later renamed Jowhar.

== Personal life ==
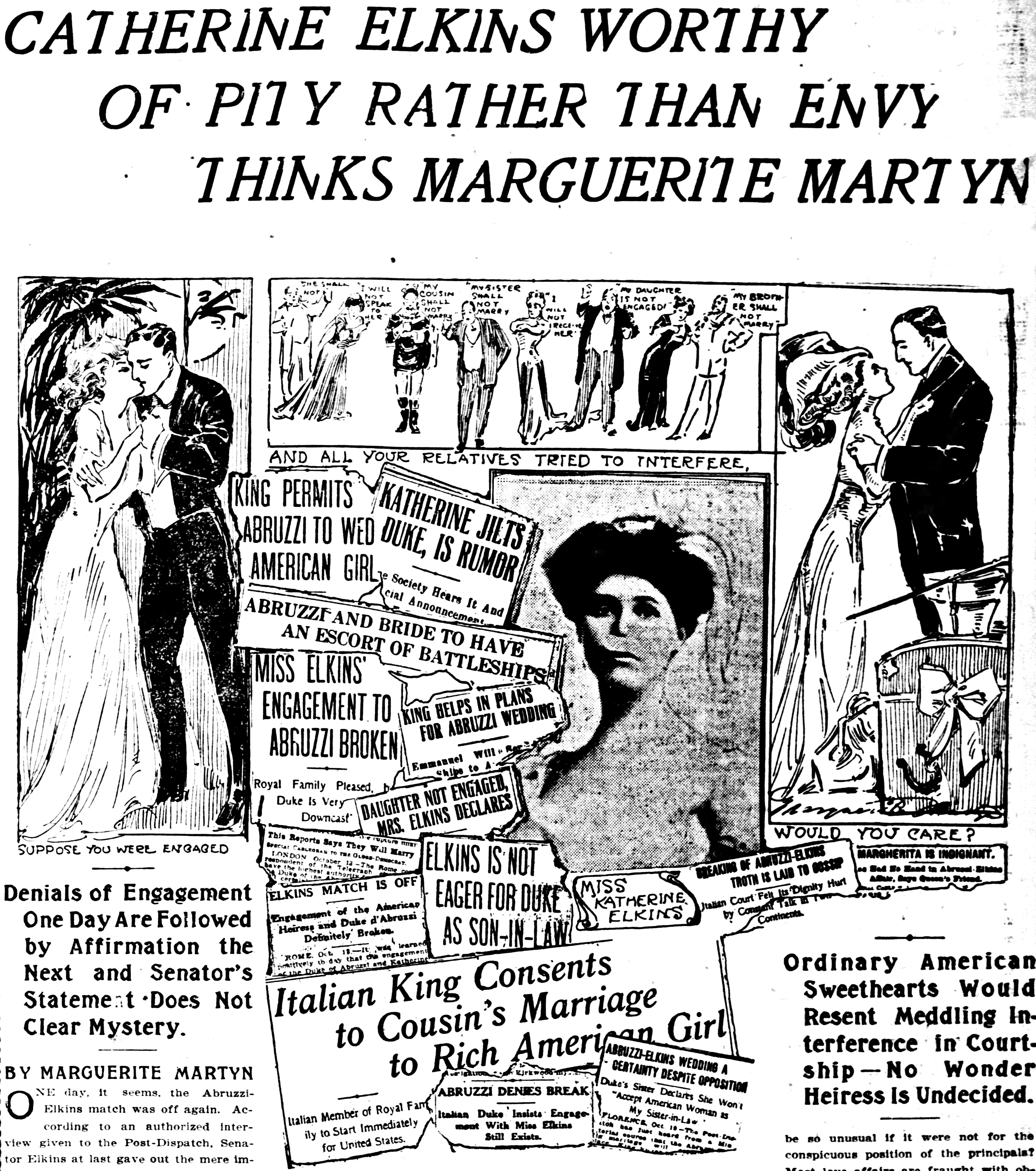
Past headlines and a photo from the St. Louis Post-Dispatch of October 18, 1908, concerning the Amedeo-Elkins romance, with three drawings by journalist Marguerite Martyn

In the early years of the twentieth century, Abruzzi was in a relationship with Katherine Hallie "Kitty" Elkins, daughter of the wealthy American senator Stephen Benton Elkins, but Abruzzi's cousin King Victor Emmanuel III of Italy refused to grant him permission to marry a commoner. His brother, Emanuele Filiberto, to whom Luigi was very close, persuaded him to give up the relationship. His brother later approved of young Antoinette "Amber" Brizzi, the daughter of Quinto Brizzi, one of the largest vineyard owners in Northern Italy. Despite this, Abruzzi was never officially married; however, in the later years of his life, Abruzzi had a relationship and deep romantic partnership with Faduma Ali, a young Somali woman who stayed by his side even while he was on his deathbed.

== Scientific works ==
- La Stella Polare nel Mare Artico 1899-1900 (1902)
  - On the "Pole Star" in the Arctic Sea (1903) by H.R.H. Luigi Amadeo of Savoy, (Duke of the Abruzzi), translated by William Le Queux, 2 vols.
- Osservazioni scientifiche, eseguite durante la spedizione polare di S.A.R. Luigi Amedeo di Savoia (1903, with Umberto Cagni and Cavalli-Molinelli)

== Animal named in honor ==
A species of African lizard, Leptosiaphos aloysiisabaudiae, is named in honor of Prince Luigi Amedeo.

== Honours ==
Styles of Prince Luigi Amedeo, Duke of the Abruzzi
- Reference style: His Royal Highness
- Spoken style: Your Royal Highness

- Kingdom of Italy:
  - Knight of the Supreme Order of the Most Holy Annunciation, 2 May 1893
  - Knight Grand Cross of the Order of Saints Maurice and Lazarus, 2 May 1893
  - Knight Grand Cross of the Order of the Crown of Italy, 2 May 1893
  - Commander of the Military Order of Savoy, 16 March 1913; Grand Officer, 29 December 1916; Grand Cross, 7 February 1924
  - Knight of the Civil Order of Savoy
- Sovereign Military Order of Malta: Knight of Honour and Devotion of the Military Order of Malta
- Empire of Japan: Grand Cordon of the Order of the Chrysanthemum, 19 June 1895
- United Kingdom:
  - Honorary Knight Grand Cross of the Royal Victorian Order, 21 November 1899
  - Founder's Medal, 1901
- Sweden: Knight of the Royal Order of the Seraphim, 11 September 1900
- United States: Cullum Geographical Medal, 1903
- Siam: Knight of the Most Illustrious Order of the Royal House of Chakri, 2 January 1904
- Albania: Grand Cordon of the Order of the Black Eagle, 1914
- Spain: Grand Cross of the Royal and Distinguished Order of Charles III, with Collar, 1928

== Ancestry ==
Ancestors of Prince Luigi Amedeo, Duke of the Abruzzi

8. Charles Albert of Sardinia
4. Victor Emmanuel II of Italy
9. Archduchess Maria Theresa of Austria
2. Amadeo I of Spain
10. Archduke Rainer Joseph of Austria
5. Archduchess Adelaide of Austria
11. Princess Elisabeth of Savoy
1. Prince Luigi Amedeo, Duke of the Abruzzi
12. Giuseppe Alfonso dal Pozzo, Prince of Cisterna
6. Carlo Emanuele dal Pozzo, Prince of Cisterna
13. Maria Anna Balbo Bertone dei Conti di Sambuy
3. Maria Vittoria dal Pozzo, Princess of Cisterna
14. Count Werner de Mérode-Westerloo
7. Countess Louise de Mérode-Westerloo
15. Countess Victoire van Spangen d'Uyternesse

== See also ==
- Picco Luigi Amedeo, a mountain in the Mont Blanc massif in the Val d'Aosta, Italy
- Savoia Peak, a peak at the northeast end of Sierra DuFief
- Luigi Island, an island in Franz Joseph Land
- Al Abraq, Libya, named Luigi di Savoia during the time Libya was an Italian colony.
- Duke of Abruzzi's Free-tailed Bat, a species of bat
- Abruzzi Secondary School, Shigar, Gilgit Baltistan
- Italian cruiser Luigi di Savoia Duca degli Abruzzi, an Italian cruiser

== Notes ==
Prince Luigi Amedeo, Duke of the Abruzzi House of Savoy Born: 29 January 1873 Died: 18 March 1933
Italian nobility
New title	Duke of the Abruzzi; 1st creation 1890 – 1933	Vacant Never bestowed upon till Title next held by Prince Amedeo Michele
