= Villaggio Duca degli Abruzzi =

Italian Somalian village

Coordinates: 2°47′N 45°30′E

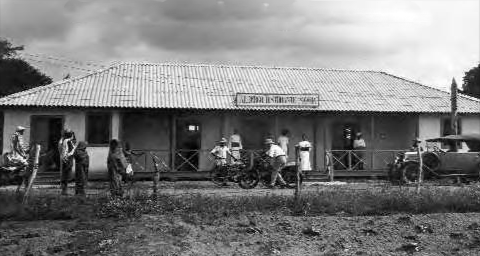
Old Postcard of Italian Somalia, dated 1938, showing the Hotel "Albergo Villaggio Duca degli Abruzzi" in Villabruzzi

Villaggio Duca degli Abruzzi (often called "Villabruzzi" in Italian) was a village that was founded as an agricultural settlement in Italian Somalia.

== Data ==
The Duca degli Abruzzi, a senior member of the Italian Royal Family, created the village in 1920 and raised funds for a number of development projects in this agricultural place, including roads, dams, schools, hospitals, a church and a mosque. He died in the village on 18 March 1933.

The Mogadishu-Villabruzzi Railway was initially built for the surrounding area of Mogadishu (Mogadiscio in Italian), after World War I in 1914. In the 1924, it was extended to Afgooye. In 1927, it was extended again by the Duca degli Abruzzi to the Shebelle River colonial village he was then developing. The line, 114 km long, reached Villabruzzi in 1928. The original proposal was for the railway to go on from Villabruzzi to the Somali border with Ethiopia and into the Ogaden, but the Second Italo-Abyssinian War in 1936 stopped further construction.

From 1911 in the Shebeli river area the Italian government started to take the local farmers and resettle them in specific new villages in an attempt to improve the economy of Italian Somalia. The area around the "Villaggio Duca degli Abruzzi" was the most agriculturally developed of Somalia before World War II and had some food industries.

In the Villaggio Duca degli Abruzzi the Italian colonists were experimenting with new cultivation techniques. In 1926, the colony comprised 16 villages, with some 3,000 Somali and 200 Italian inhabitants. It was commonly known as Villabruzzi.

In 1940, Villabruzzi had a population of 12,000, of whom nearly 3,000 were Italian Somalis, and enjoyed a notable level of development as a small manufacturing area.

World War II hit the city and the agricultural production of the surrounding area hard. Currently the city has a new name: Jowhar.

== Bibliography ==
- Tripodi, Paolo. The Colonial Legacy in Somalia. St. Martin's P Inc. New York, 1999.
