= Guido Corni =

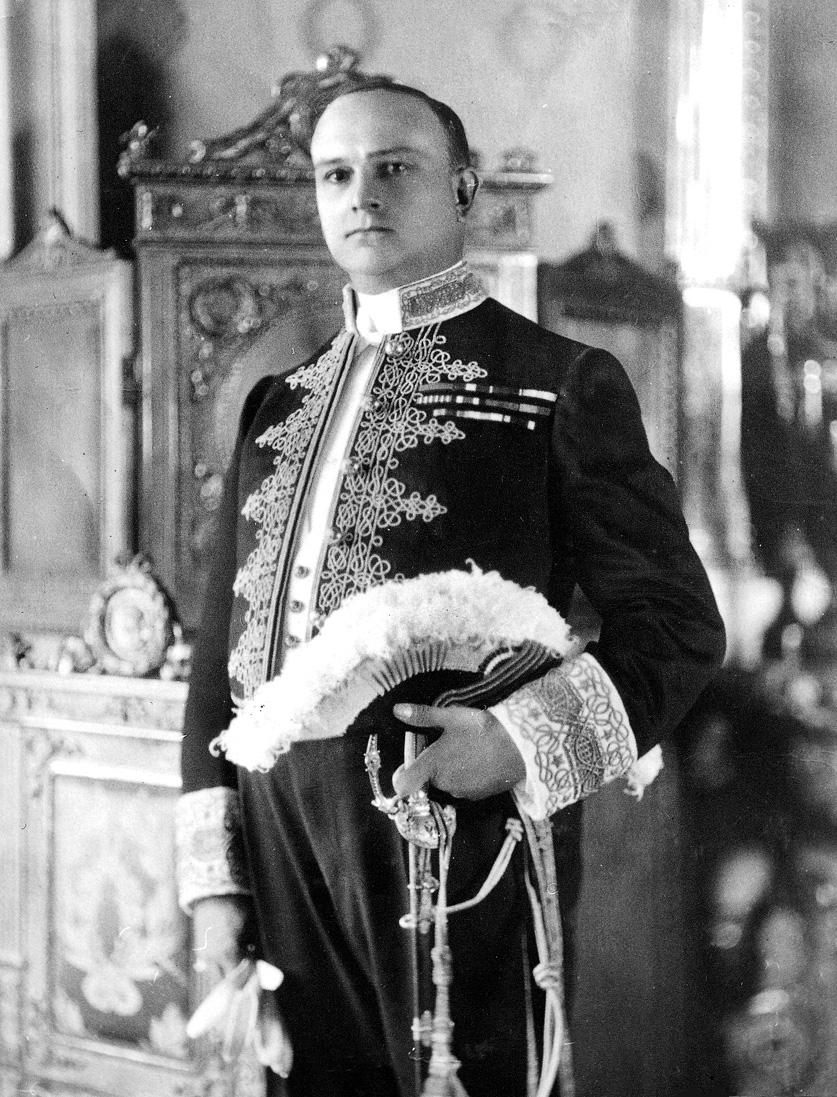
Guido Corni, Governor of Italian Somalia

Guido Corni (August 25, 1883 – February 28, 1946) was a colonial governor of Italian Somaliland.

== Life ==
Born in Stradella, province of Pavia, he began in his youth he followed Risorgimento ideals. He graduated in industrial chemistry and was a successful entrepreneur: he created the "Fabbrica Modenese Utensileria e Ferramenta Corni Bassani". In 1919 he enrolled in the Modena fascist party

In March 1911 Guido Corni went to Italian Tripolitania to study the possible economic development of the region. He explored all of Italian Libya in the following years. In 1923 he was promoted to become head of the fascist party in Modena.

From 1 June 1928 to 1 July 1931 Guido Corni was Governor of Somalia, promoting the integration of the local population to the Italian colonial system. He also began to improve the economy of the colony: in those years the Italian colonization of the Genale area began in southern Somalia, forming a group of small and medium-sized farms. Most settlers were former fascist militants from Turin. The first informal association of farmers, however, arose only in 1928, promoted by Corni. The primary crop of the area was cotton, grown by small farms owned by Italian settlers: about one hundred farms with an area varying between 75 and 600 hectares (with an average that oscillated around 200), with a total area of about 20,000 hectares. Cotton predominated at least until 1931, then was replaced by banana production, whose harvest was sold to the Italian State, which sold them in Italy as a monopoly.

Corni also promoted the occupation of border areas in the Ogaden region of southern Ethiopia: the Ual-Ual occupation by his Somali colonial troops was the cause of the start of the Italian-Ethiopian war in early 1935.

In 1935 Corni returned to Italy, where he wrote his most famous books (about "Somalia italiana", vol. I & II) and continued his successful career as entrepreneur. He was named President of the "Federazione imprese trasporti automobilistici".

But in 1937, Corni harshly criticized Italian Fascism's growing links with Hitler's Nazism and was expelled from the Modena Fascist Party. He then retired on a huge mansion ("Castle Monfestino") he had in the Apennine Mountains until his death, because of heart problems.

He died on February 28, 1946, in Genoa.

== See also ==
- Cesare Maria De Vecchi

== Bibliography ==
- Bartolacelli, Giuliano and Enzo. Un imprenditore modenese. Fermo Corni e il castello di Monfestino. CS Litografia, Modena, 2001
- Focherini, Franco. Il fascismo modenese minuto per minuto edizioni Il Fiorino. Modena, 2001
- Nuzzi, Olimpia. Il Corni e Modena. Corni Edizione, Modena, 2003

Preceded by Cesare Maria De Vecchi	Italian Governors of Somaliland; 1 June 1928 – 1 July 1931	Succeeded by Maurizio Rava
