= Jowhar District =

Jowhar
- District
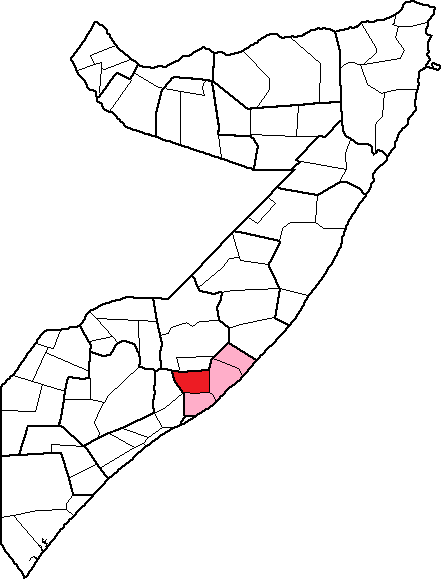
- Country: Somalia
- Region: Middle Shabelle
- Capital: Jowhar

Population (2014)
  - Total: 269,851
- Time zone: UTC+3 (EAT)

Jowhar District (Somali: Degmada Jowhar) is a district of the southeastern Middle Shabelle in Somalia. Its capital lies at Jowhar. The district had estimated population of 269,851 as of 2014, a survey was done by (UNDP) in 2014.

== Villages ==
Nagey
