= Jowhar =

Jowhar جوهر
- City
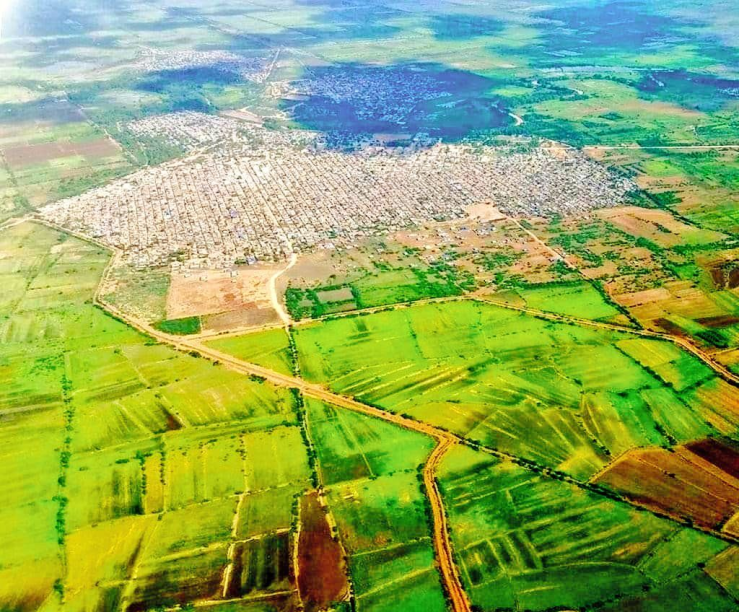
- An aerial view of Jowhar

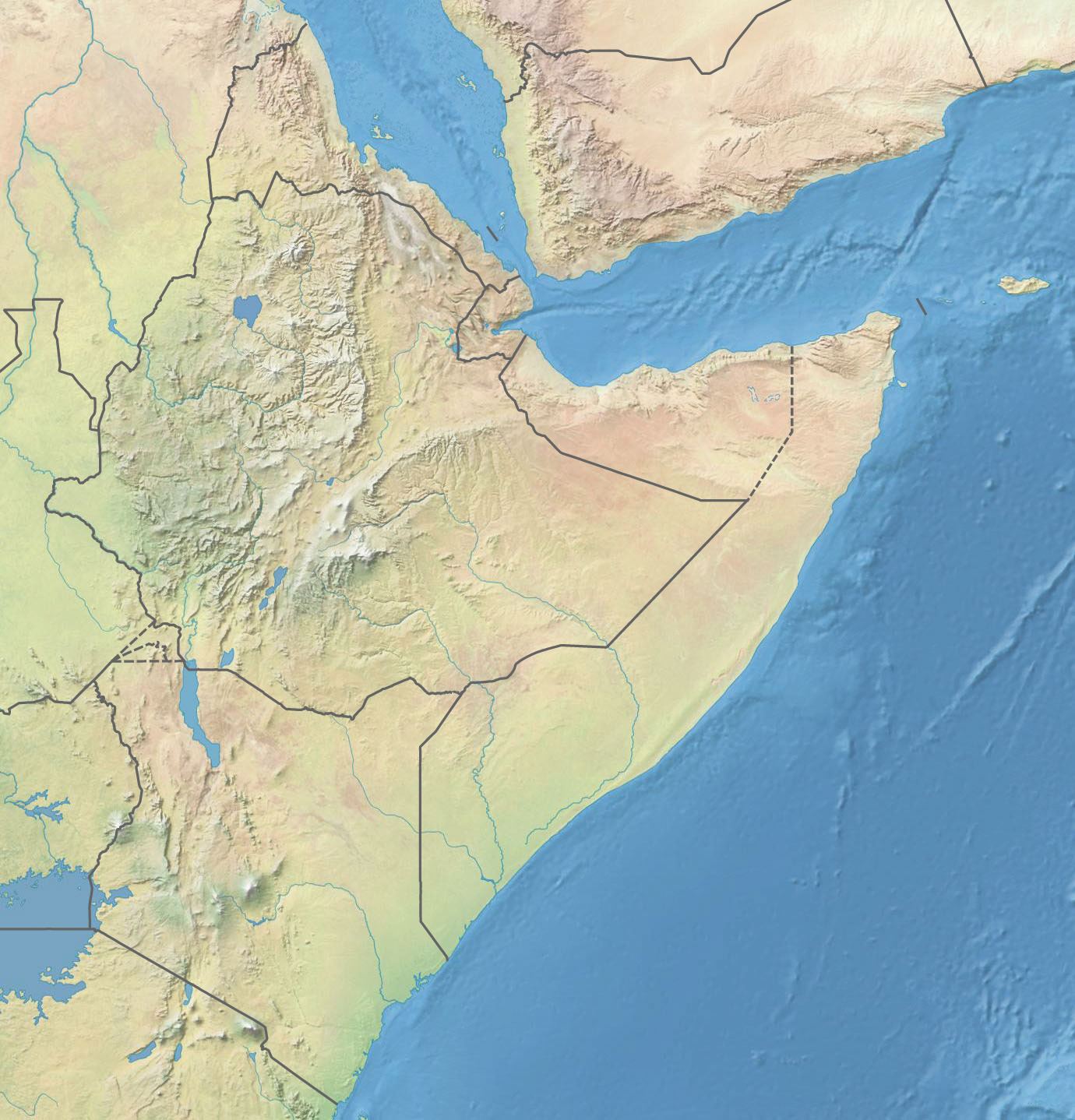
- Location within Somalia Location within the Horn of Africa Location within Africa
- Coordinates: 2°47′N 45°30′E
- Country: Somalia
- State: Hirshabelle
- Region: Middle Shabelle

Government
  - Type: Mayor-Council-Commission

Area
  - Total: 9.7 sq mi (25 km^{2})
- Elevation: 330 ft (100 m)

Population (2018)
  - Total: 750,000
- Time zone: UTC+3 (EAT)
- Area code: 061

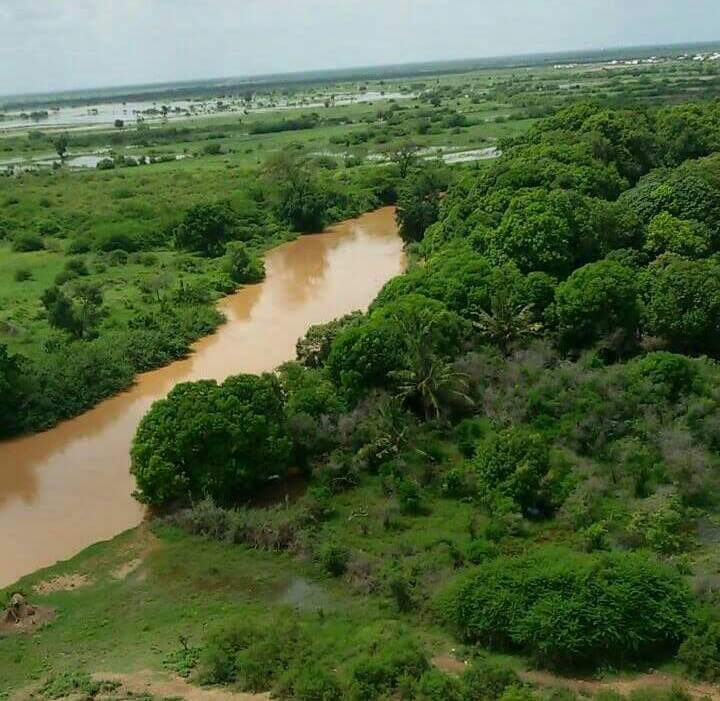
Shebelle River

Jowhar (Somali: Jowhar, Arabic: جوهر, Italian: Giohar) is the capital city of Hirshabelle state of Somalia. Jowhar is also the administrative capital of Middle Shabelle region of Somalia.

Along with Baidoa, it used to form the joint administrative capital of the Transitional Federal Government, which it captured from the Islamic Courts Union.

The city lies 90 km (50 mi) along a major road north of the national capital of Mogadishu.

== Etymology ==
Jowhar, (also Jawharad or Johoorad) is the word for a precious stone in Somali, and the city may have been named after the lush lands it's situated on, near the Shabelle river. Originally from Persian, this word is also used in Arabic and other languages to describe gemstones and other jewels.

== History ==
During the Middle Ages, Jowhar and much of the surrounding area in southern Somalia was governed by the Ajuran Empire. The town later came under the administration of the Hiraab Imamate in the late 17th century after the collapse of the powerful Ajuran Empire. At the turn of the 20th century, Jowhar was incorporated into Italian Somaliland. After independence in 1960, the city was made the center of the official Jowhar District.

=== Villaggio Duca degli Abruzzi ===
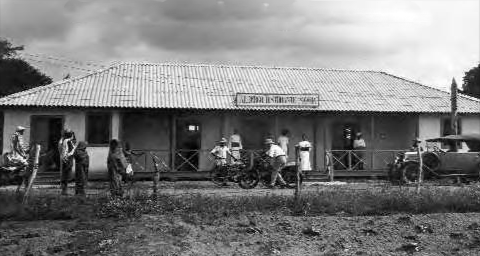
Jowhar Albergo Hotel 1938

The Villaggio Duca degli Abruzzi was founded by a senior member of the Italian Royal Family, H.R.H. Principe Luigi Amedeo, Duca degli Abruzzi in 1920, who first came to the African continent in 1905 and liked the place. The Duke raised funds to build dams, roads, a railway, schools, hospitals, a church and a mosque.

The village called Villaggio Duca degli Abruzzi (or Villabruzzi) was founded as an agricultural settlement in Italian Somalia experimenting with new cultivation techniques. In 1926, the colony comprised 16 villages, with some 3,000 Somali and 200 Italian inhabitants. It was commonly known as Villabruzzi.

Starting around 1911, Italians like the Duca degli Abruzzi started to take the local farmers and resettle them in specific new villages in an attempt to improve the economy of Italian Somalia. The area around Villabruzzi was the most agriculturally developed of Somalia before World War II and had some food industries.

== Administrative capital ==
As part of a 2004 agreement, Jowhar and the town of Baidoa were to form a joint administrative capital of the Transitional Federal Government, sited away from Mogadishu for security reasons. Continued fighting threatened to derail the peace process. However, in July 2005, President Abdullahi Yusuf Ahmed relocated to the town from his base in Bosaso, moving the process forward and joining Prime Minister Ali Mohammed Ghedi, who had already been resident in the town for a month. Part of the parliament became based in Jowhar, while some ministries were established in Mogadishu. By February 2006, despite Ghedi's security concerns, the two leaders had left to Baidoa, where it was decided the parliament would convene.

== Demographics ==
The district had estimated population of 269,851 as of 2014, a survey was done by UNDP.

== Recent history ==
=== Ethiopian invasion and occupation (2006–2009) ===
During the Ethiopian invasion of Somalia, the city was captured from the Islamic Courts Union during the Battle of Jowhar on December 27, 2006. ICU insurgents recaptured Jowhar on 12 July 2008 and took over the towns administration.

=== Somali Civil War (2009–present) ===
On May 17, 2009, the Islamist al-Shabab militia took the town, and imposed new rules, including a ban on handshaking between men and women. TFG and ICU paramilitary forces were dispatched to seize back the town.

On December 9, 2012, Somali National Army forces assisted by AMISOM troops re-captured the city from the militants.

== See also ==
- Italian Somalis
- Maandere
- Railway Mogadiscio-Villabruzzi

== Bibliography ==
- VILLES EN GUERRE EN SOMALIE :MOGADISCIO ET HARGEISA Marc-Antoine PÉROUSE DE MONTCLOS (https://web.archive.org/web/20061126204259/http://ceped.cirad.fr/cdrom/integral_publication_1988_2002/dossier/pdf/dossiers_cpd_59.pdf)
