= Adale =

- Town
- Location in Somalia.
- Coordinates: 2°45′00″N 46°19′00″E
- Country: Somalia
- State: Hirshabelle
- Region: Middle Shabelle

Population
  - Total: 91,600
- Time zone: UTC+3 (EAT)

Adale (Somali: Cadale; Italian: Adalei or Itala), also known as Cadaley, is a coastal town in the southern Middle Shabelle (Shabeellaha Dhexe) region of Somalia.

== History ==
Adale was mentioned in the Periplus of the Erythraean Sea, written by an anonymous writer who lived in the first century AD when Egypt was occupied by the Romans. Adale then appeared in the reports of Ibn Batuta and other explorers from Andulus. When the trade between East Africa, Arabia, and India boomed in the 1700s-1800s, Adale bordered the 10-mile strip of the Benadir Coast in which Zanzibar’s Omani rulers claimed. With exception to 5 nautical miles of Warsheikh, the rest of the strip included Mogadishu, Marka, Baraawe, and Kismayo – all the way to Zanzibar. The later ruins of Filonardi's fort can also be found in the Adale.

During the pre-independence period in Italian Somaliland, the city was chosen by Vincenzo Filonardi as the headquarters of his newly created "Somalia Italiana". There was fierce anti-colonial resistance to this in Adale and around the surrounding areas that left 40 Abgaal men and 7 Italian men dead commemorated by a monument in Adale.

On 3 October 2014 the town was liberated from the jihadist group Al-Shabaab by the Somalia National Army and AMISOM forces. Al-Shabaab had occupied the town for several years. According to AMISOM-sources Al-Shabaab did not mount any resistance because they had lost support from the public in Adale.

== Demographics ==
Adale has a population of around 14,600 inhabitants. The broader Adale District has a total population of 46,720 residents. It is inhabited by Abgaal.

== See also ==
- Mogadishu-Villabruzzi Railway
