= Janale =

Janale Genale
- Town
- Location in Somalia.
- Coordinates: 1°48′N 44°42′E
- Country: Somalia
- Region: Lower Shebelle
- Control: Al-Shabaab
- Time zone: UTC+3 (EAT)

Janale (Somali: Janaale, Arabic: جانالة, Italian: Genale) is agricultural town in the southeastern Lower Shebelle (Shabeellaha Hoose) region of Somalia.

The late Aden Abdullah Osman Daar (Adan Cadde), Somalia's first president, had a farm in the town.

Al-Shabaab controlled the town with established illegal checkpoints until 2024.

== See also ==
- Port of Merca
- Genale
