= Port of Mogadishu =

Port in Mogadishu, Somalia

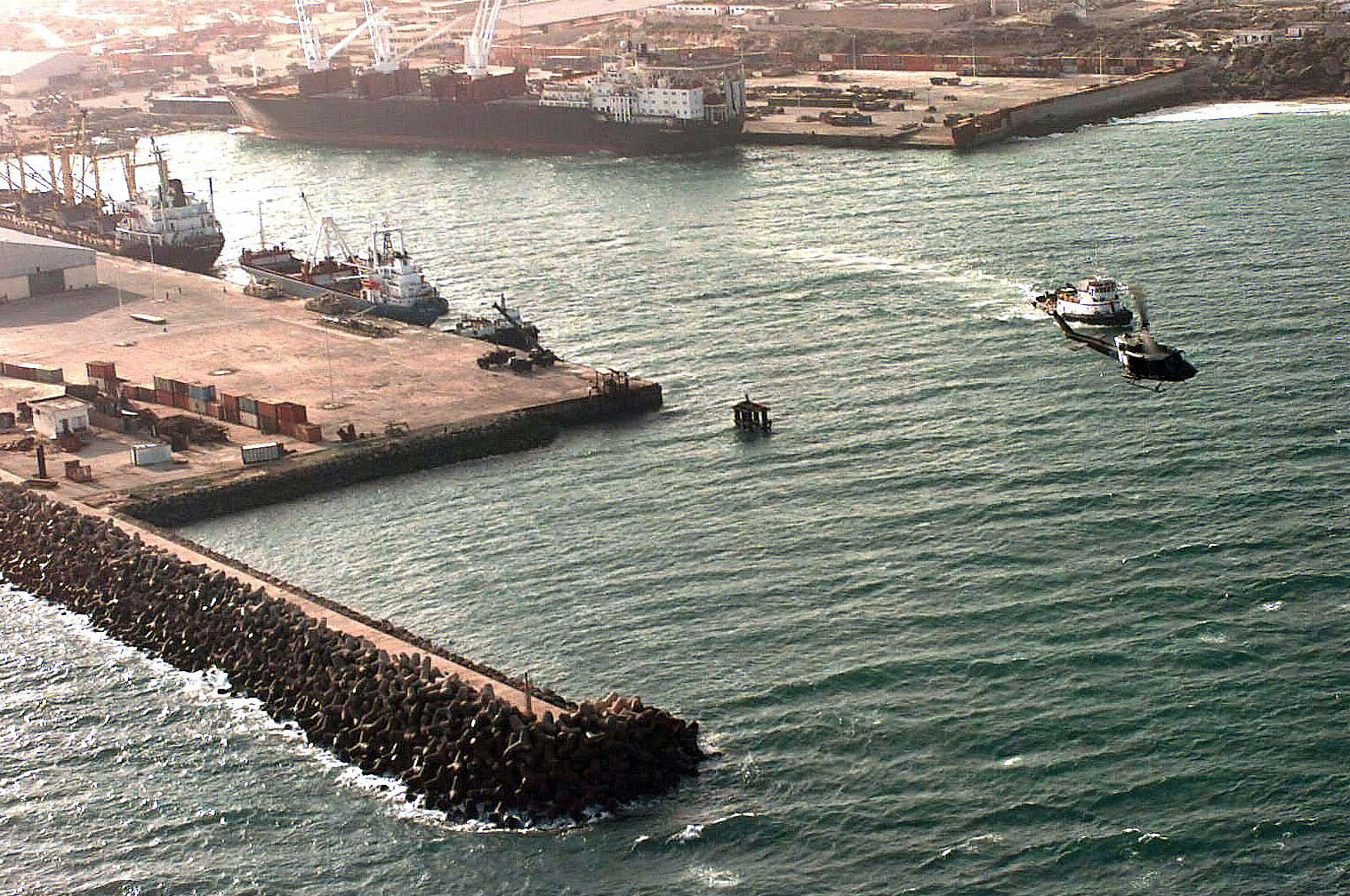
- The Port of Mogadishu harbor
- Interactive map of Port of Mogadishu

Location
- Country: Somalia
- Location: Mogadishu
- Coordinates: 2°1′N 45°19′E
- UN/LOCODE: SOMGQ

Details
- Operated by: Albayrak Group
- Owned by: Somali Port Authority

Statistics
- 2024 World Bank Container Port Performance Index: 163rd (out of 403)
- Website www.portofmogadishu.com

The Port of Mogadishu, (Somali: Dekada Muqdisho, Italian: Porto di Mogadiscio) also known as the Mogadishu International Port, is the official seaport of Mogadishu, the capital of Somalia. Classified as a major class port, it is the largest harbour in the country.

== Historical overview ==
Since the Roman Empire, a commercial port called Sarapion existed in what is now modern Mogadishu. However, during the Middle Ages the port of Mogasdishu was very small and only with the arrival of the Italians in 1890 were the first improvements made in order to create a modern port. The port has since increased in capacity to become the most important port of Somalia and one of the biggest in eastern Africa.

=== Porto di Mogadiscio ===
The Port of Mogadishu was created as a modern port (called in Italian Porto di Mogadiscio) with magazines and docks in the late 1920s by the Italian government of Italian Somalia. In 1930 a protective dike with breakwaters was made in front of the enlarged port, which was connected to the Somalia interior by a railway and even by a new "imperial road" (from Mogadishu to Addis Ababa).

In 1934, the port of Italian Mogadiscio had exports of 43.467 tons of agricultural products (mainly bananas) to Italy and Europe. For this commercial transport were used the service of special container-ships called "RAMB" (that were built with the possibility to be converted to be an auxiliary cruiser). The Ramb II was a banana boat based in Mogadishu. This was the second of four sister ships all built to the same design: the other ships were the Ramb I, the Ramb III, and the Ramb IV. The four ships were built for the Royal Banana Monopoly ("Regia Azienda Monopolio Banane") to transport refrigerated bananas from Italian Somalia to Italy.

In 1936 the port started to have a weekly international ship line for passengers, connecting Mogadishu with Massawa and Genoa with the Italian Lloyd Triestino and Italian Line. The MS Vulcania was a transatlantic ship that served the port of Mogadiscio. Later, in 1941 the port was damaged by British bombings during World War II.

During the 1960s the port was improved, thanks to studies done by the US Army Corps of Engineers.

== Mogadishu Port Rehabilitation Project ==
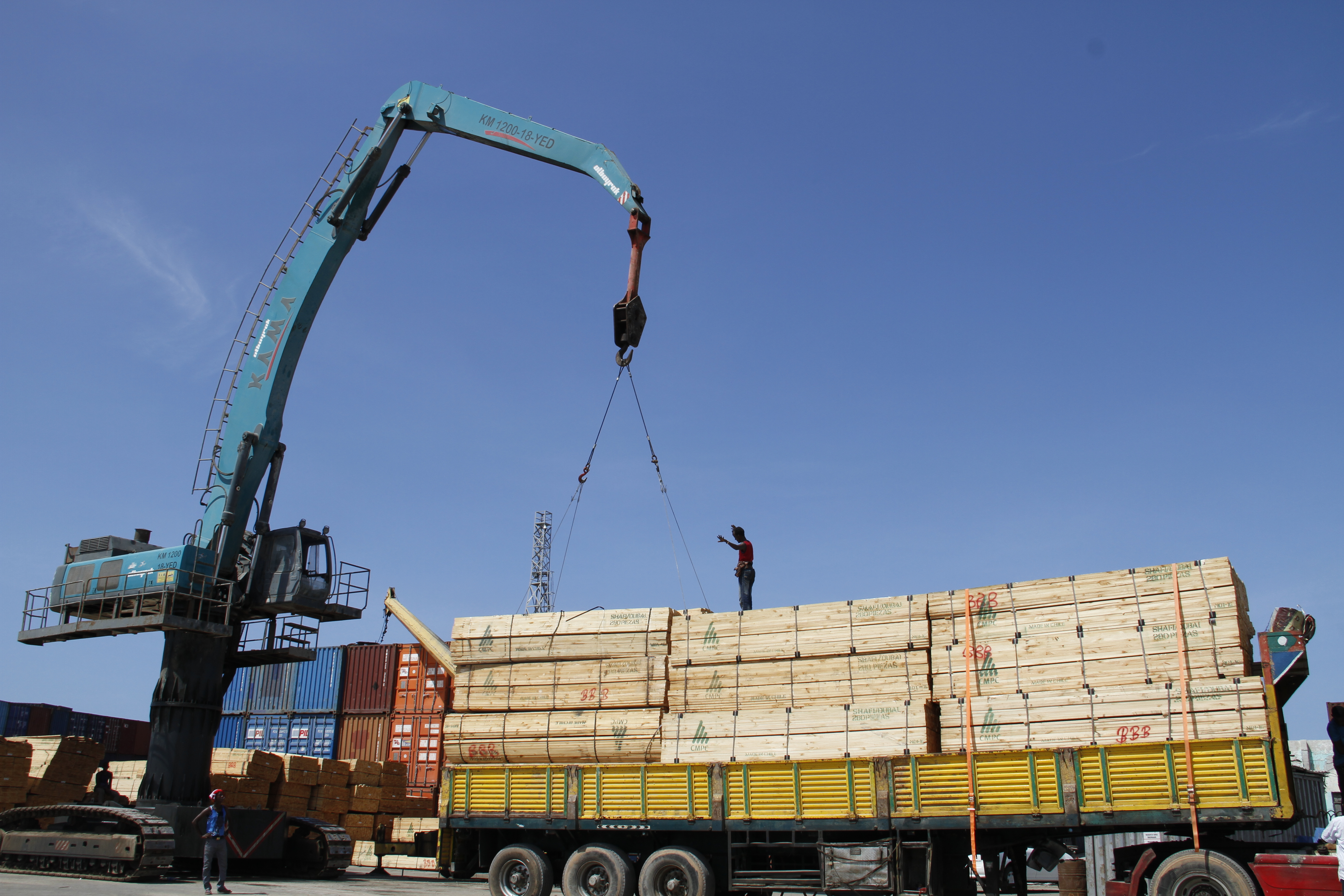
A man controls cargo handling equipment as they offload.

After it incurred some damage during the civil war, the Federal Government of Somalia launched the Mogadishu Port Rehabilitation Project, an initiative to rebuild, develop and modernize the port. The renovations include the installation of Alpha Logistics technology. A joint international delegation consisting of the Director of the Port of Djibouti and Chinese officials specializing in infrastructure reconstruction concurrently visited the facility in June 2013. According to Mogadishu Port manager Abdullahi Ali Nur, the delegates along with local Somali officials received reports on the port's functions as part of the rebuilding project's planning stages.

In November 2014, Minister of Transportation Said Jama Mohamed launched a new transportation reform initiative at the Port of Mogadishu. The minister met with local transportation union officials to discuss how to optimize the new system's implementation, ensure its transparency and accountability, and gauge their requirements and those of the owners of transported goods that they represent. According to Mohamed, the project's ultimate goal is to establish a fair transportation system. He also stressed that transport owners should make sure that their vehicles are in good condition and attain the standards of goods owners.

=== Simatech Shipping ===
In 2013, the Port of Mogadishu's management reportedly reached an agreement with representatives of the Dubai-based company Simatech Shipping LLC to handle vital operations at the seaport. Under the name Mogadishu Port Container Terminal, the firm is slated to handle all of the port's technical and operational functions.

=== Albayrak ===
In October 2013, the federal Cabinet endorsed an agreement with the Turkish firm Albayrak to manage the Port of Mogadishu for a 5-year period. According to the Prime Minister's Office, the deal was secured by the Ministry of Ports and Public Works, and also assigns Albayrak responsibility for rebuilding and modernizing the port. Albayrak had previously overseen construction of the Istanbul Metro in Istanbul. In April 2014, the Federal Parliament postponed finalization of the Seaport Management Deal pending the approval of a new foreign investment bill. The MPs also requested that the agreement be submitted to the legislature for deliberation and to ensure that the interests of the port's manual labourers are taken into account. In September 2014, the federal government officially delegated management of the Mogadishu Port to Albayrak. The Turkish company's head Ahmed Salim indicated that under the terms of the agreement, 55% of revenue generated at the seaport will go to the government and the remaining 45% is earmarked for the firm. According to Minister for Transports and Seaport Yussuf Maolim Amin, the management transfer is expected to double the federal authorities' income from the Port. Albayrak's modernization project will cost $80 million.

According to Albayrak, the majority of its revenue share will be re-invested in the seaport through additional port-based trade and new docks, construction materials and machinery. The company also plans to install an environment wall and a closed circuit camera system in accordance with international security protocols, erect a modern port administration building, and clean the ship entrance channels via underwater surveillance. As of September 2014, the first phase of the renovations were reportedly complete, with the second phase underway. During its first month of operation under Albayrak, the port generated $2.7 million in service revenue.

=== African Shipping Line–Mogadishu ===
Towards 2014, a Dubai-registered shipping line company advanced its expansion to Mogadishu Port. In 2015, African Shipping Line-Kenya made registration and presence as a ship agency, and container agent in the Port of Mogadishu. African Shipping Line- ASLINE Somalia, a representative of Kenya-based company African Shipping Line - ASLINE Kenya, is set to provide services related to Container Feeder Shipping, ship liner agency and logistic services at Mogadishu as well as other Somalia Ports like Kismayo, Bosasso and Berbera port in Somaliland.

== See also ==
- Transportation in Somalia
