= Mario Bonetti =

Italian admiral (1888–1961)

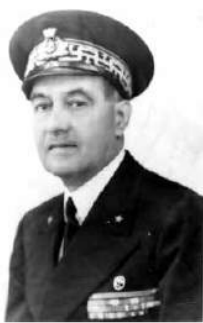
- Born: 3 March 1888; Arezzo, Tuscany, Italy
- Died: 16 February 1961 (aged 72); Genoa, Ligury, Italy
- Military career
- Allegiance: Kingdom of Italy
- Branch: Regia Marina
- Service years: 1906–1947
- Rank: Contrammiraglio (Rear Admiral)
- Commands: F 10 (submarine); Ammiraglio Magnaghi (hydrographic survey ship); N 3 (submarine); Quarto (scout cruiser); Balilla (submarine); Antonio Sciesa (submarine); Italian Hydrographic Institute; Naval High Command East Africa; Italian Naval Academy
- Conflicts: Italo-Turkish War; World War I; Adriatic Campaign; World War II; East African Campaign
- Awards: Silver Medal of Military Valor War Cross for Military Valor Military Order of Italy Order of the German Eagle

Mario Bonetti (3 March 1888 – 16 February 1961) was an Italian admiral during World War II.

== Early life and career ==
Mario Bonetti was born in Arezzo in 1888 and entered the Italian Naval Academy in Leghorn in 1906, graduating in 1909 with the rank of ensign. His first assignments were on armored cruisers Pisa and San Marco; during the Italo-Turkish War Bonetti distinguished himself in command of landing parties in Derna and Tobruk, receiving the War Cross for Military Valor.

During World War I, Bonetti served for 21 months on submarines with the rank of lieutenant, first on submarines F 7 and F 13 and later in command of F 10; during this period he received a Silver Medal of Military Valor. Later in the war, he became executive officer of the destroyer Ardito, and he received a commendation for an action in September 1917.

From 1920 to 1926 Bonetti, with the rank of lieutenant commander, commanded the hydrographic survey vessel Ammiraglio Magnaghi during various hydrographic campaigns in the seas of Italy (except for one year when he was attached to the Hydrographic Office in Genoa), and later the submarine N 3. In 1923, he graduated in nautical sciences and hydrography. In 1927, he was promoted to commander and given command of the scout cruiser Quarto, and then of submarines Balilla and Antonio Sciesa . Afterwards, he directed for three years the Hydrographic Institute, before being promoted to captain returned to the command of Ammiraglio Magnaghi and of the Hydrographic Survey Vessel Group, which from 1934 to 1938 carried out several hydrographic campaigns in Red Sea.

== World War II and aftermath ==
In November 1940 Bonetti was promoted to rear admiral, and at the end of the year he was sent to Eritrea and given command of the Naval High Command East Africa, with headquarters in Massawa. A few months later, while the Battle of Keren was being fought, it became clear that the fall of Eritrea and Massawa was only a matter of time; Bonetti devised a plan to save the few ships able to deal with an ocean travel, and the destruction of all remaining vessels to prevent them from falling into enemy hands. On his orders, submarines Perla, Galileo Ferraris, Archimede and Guglielmotti left Eritrea at the end of March 1941, headed to Bordeaux (home of the Italian Atlantic base Betasom), while the colonial ship Eritrea, the merchant ship Himalaya and auxiliary cruisers RAMB I and RAMB II sailed for Japan. Between 31 March and 2 April, the last five remaining destroyers (Nazario Sauro, Daniele Manin, Cesare Battisti, Tigre, Leone and Pantera) were sent on a last attack against Port Sudan; all other ships, on Bonetti's orders, scuttled themselves to avoid being captured, part of them in the port of Massawa and the others in the Dahlak Islands. Bonetti arranged the scuttling of the ships in Massawa (nine Italian and five German merchant ships, the torpedo boats Giovanni Acerbi and Vincenzo Giordano Orsini, the minelayer Ostia , two gunboats three tugboats, as well as two floating docks and a floating crane) so that their wrecks would blockade the port entrances and render the harbour unusable for a long period. All ships were scuttled between 1 April and 8 April 1941.

Bonetti was also the commander of the Massawa Fortress Area and its garrison, which numbered about 10,000 men; after the end of the Battle of Keren, this was the last Italian military presence in Eritrea, along with a few hundred men in the Assab naval base. Massawa was encircled by Commonwealth forces on 5 April 1941; General Lewis Heath telephoned Bonetti and requested him to surrender and not to obstruct the port by scuttling ships, threatening otherwise to abandon the Italian civilian population in East Africa. Bonetti twice refused the ultimatum; on 8 April, the 7th Indian Infantry Brigade and the 10th Indian Infantry Brigade simultaneously attacked Massawa, supported by tanks of the 4th Royal Tank Regiment, Free French troops and the Royal Air Force (RAF), which bombed Italian artillery positions. While the attack of the 7th Indian Brigade was repelled, the 10th Indian Brigade and the tanks managed to penetrate the defences on the western side, while the Gaullist forces broke through in the southwestern sector. Bonetti capitulated in the afternoon of 8 April, after having as much equipment as possible dumped into the harbour.

For his defence of Massawa, Bonetti was awarded the Officer's Cross of the Military Order of Italy and the Cross of Order of the German Eagle. He was sent to a POW camp in British India, and remained there until 1945.

Repatriated after the war, Bonetti was promoted to the rank of vice admiral and placed in command of the Livorno Naval Academy; he was placed in auxiliary for age limits in October 1947. In 1956, he was promoted to admiral and transferred to the reserve. He died in Genoa on 19 February 1961.

== Bibliography ==
- Playfair, I. S. O.; Stitt, G. M. S.; Molony, C. J. C.; Toomer, S. E. (1954). Butler, J. R. M. (ed.). The Mediterranean and Middle East: The Early Successes Against Italy (to May 1941). History of the Second World War, United Kingdom Military Series. Vol. I (4th ed.). HMSO. ISBN 978-1-84574-065-8.
