= Vittorio di Africa =

Town in Italian Somalia

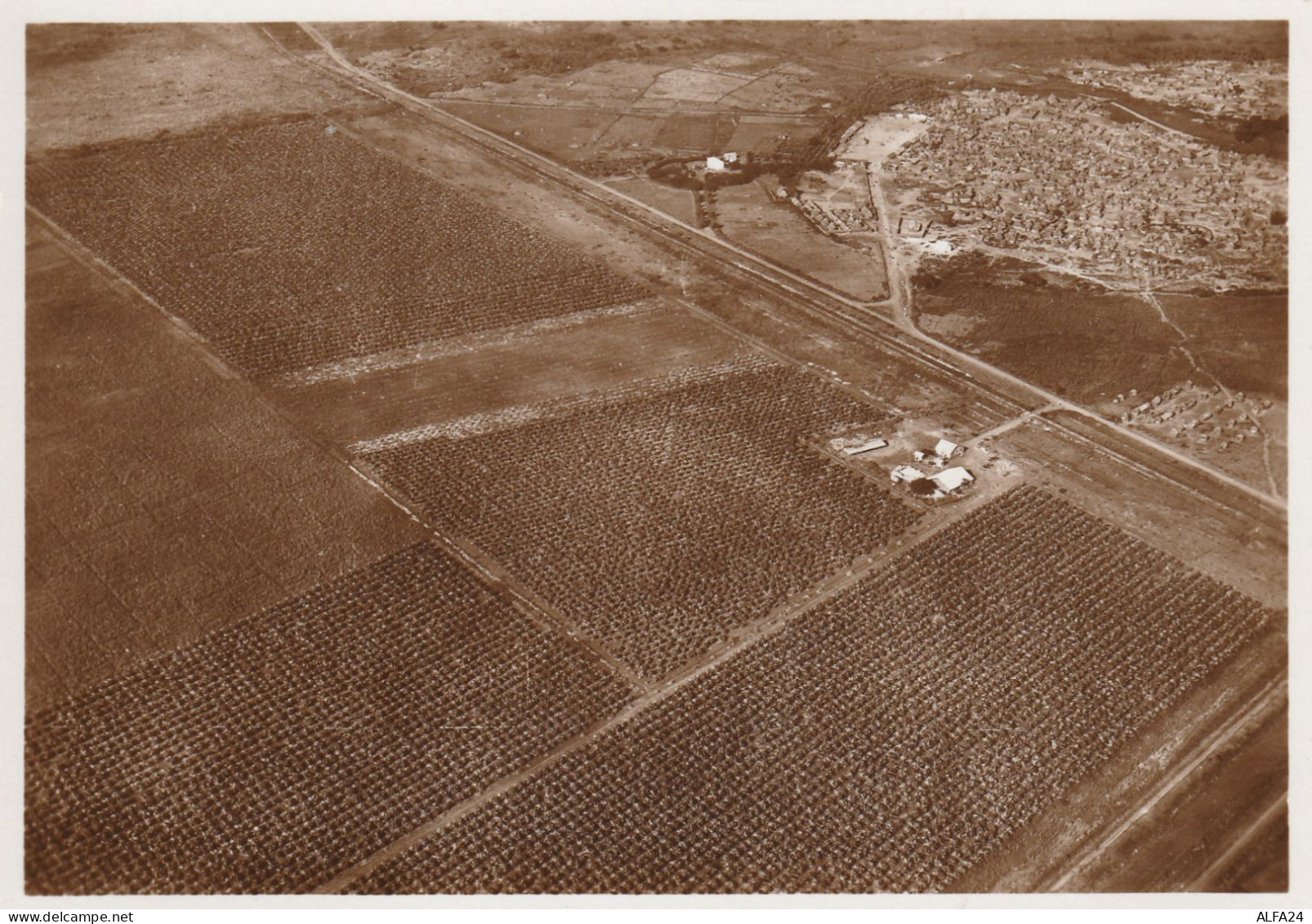
Aeral view of Vittorio di Africa, 1920s

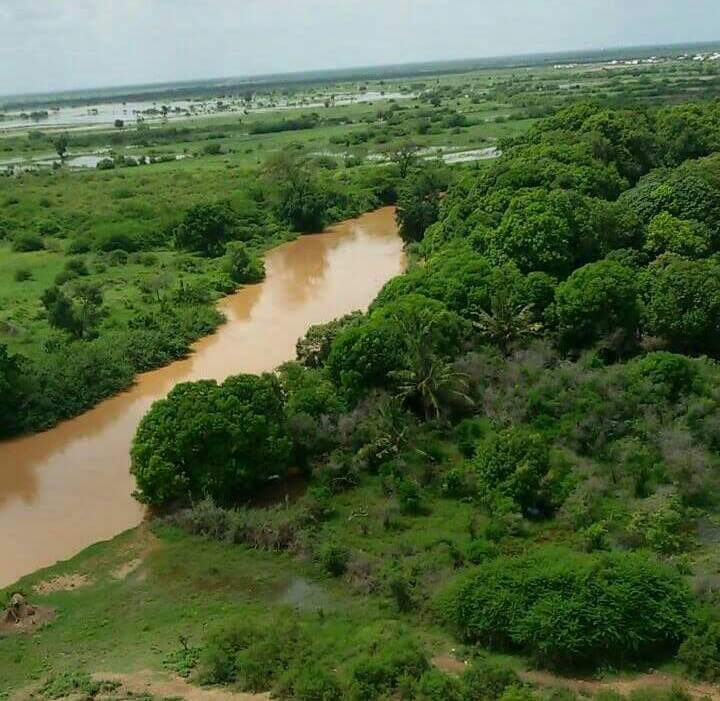
The Shebelle river near Vittorio di Africa during the rainy season

Vittorio di Africa (originally called "Vittorio d'Affrica" or simply "Vittorio") was a small town in southern Italian Somalia, created by Italian colonists in the late 1920s near the southern Shebelle River.

== History ==
The Genale dam on the Shebelle River, together with an extensive network of canals, was built in the south of Somalia in the late 1920s. It was strongly promoted by Cesare Maria De Vecchi -Italian governor of Italian Somalia from 1924 to 1928- in order to provide water for irrigation of a vast territory of 20,000 hectares between Genale, Merca and Vittorio d'Africa, to be given in concession to Italian colonists.

One hundred of those colonists created in the south of the Genale concessions (called in Italian Concessioni agricole) a small city named "Vittorio d'Africa", that had a population of nearly 1,200 inhabitants in 1940. It was located 11 km from Merca. The city was linked to the Port of Merca by a decauville railway, used to transport the huge production of bananas of the farms around Vittorio d'Africa.

Vittorio d'Africa was founded on March 5, 1928, by prince Umberto di Savoia (who in 1946 was the last King of Italy) on a hill at 70 meters of altitude and nearly 15 km from the Port of Merca. It had a small hospital and buildings for processing local food products.

During the Italian colonial period Genale and Vittorio di Africa were the center of a vast area of agricultural concessions for the cultivation of banana, cotton and other subsidiaries. The bananas were the main product and were marketed by the Royal Banana Monopoly (abbreviated RAMB) that had, in fact, a monopoly of the export to Italy granted in order to safeguard banana production in Somalia on the Italian market. Consequently, until the 1950s all the bananas consumed in Italy came from the area of Genale and Vittorio.

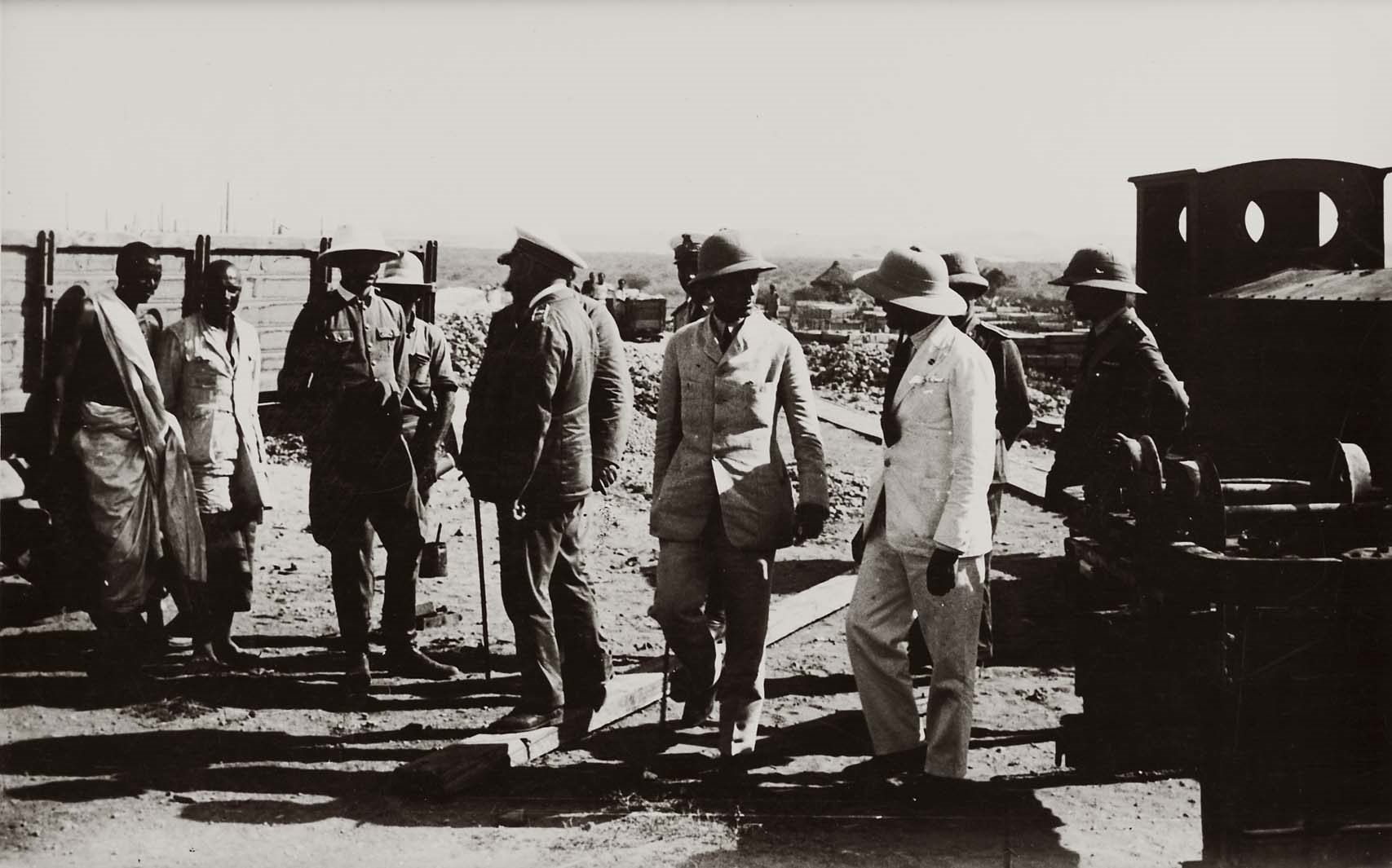
1927 Photo of decauville railway station in the "Vittorio d'Affrica" farm area

The cultivation was made possible by a large dam in the river Shebelle, and by a vast network of canals built between 1924 and 1926. Given the importance of the area it was created, from the administrative point of view, the Vicecommissariato di Genale with Vittorio D'Africa as capital (currently "Scialambod"), where industrial activities were focused also for the processing of agricultural products.

It is noteworthy to pinpoint that in 1939 Italian Somalia nearly all the development was concentrated in the triangle "Genale/Vittorio - Villabruzzi - Mogadiscio". The center of Vittorio di Africa was a few kilometers inland from the city of Merca which is its Port of Merca. During the period dell'A.F.I.S. (Trust Territory of Somalia) in the years 1950–60, the local "Consortium of farmer-dealers" in the area was reinforced, but in the late 1970s started to lose importance and in the 1990s disappeared.

The late Aden Abdullah Osman Daar (Adan Cadde), Somalia's first president, had a farm in the town.[6]

During World War II in Vittorio d'Africa was done by the Italians the last battle against the British army before the Allies attacked Mogadishu in 1941: because of this fight the small city suffered heavy damages. After the war all the Italians moved away and the farm production dwindled, reducing the city to a kind of ghost town. Actually is growing in the area of the disappeared Vittorio d'Africa a small village of Somalis, called Shalam boot.

== Bibliography ==
- De Vecchi di Val Cismon, Cesare. Relazione sul progetto di Bilancio della Somalia Italiana per l'esercizio finanziario 1927-1928.

== See also ==
- Somalia italiana
- Genale
- Mogadishu under Italian rule
- Dam of Genale Doria
- Port of Merca
