= Port of Merca =

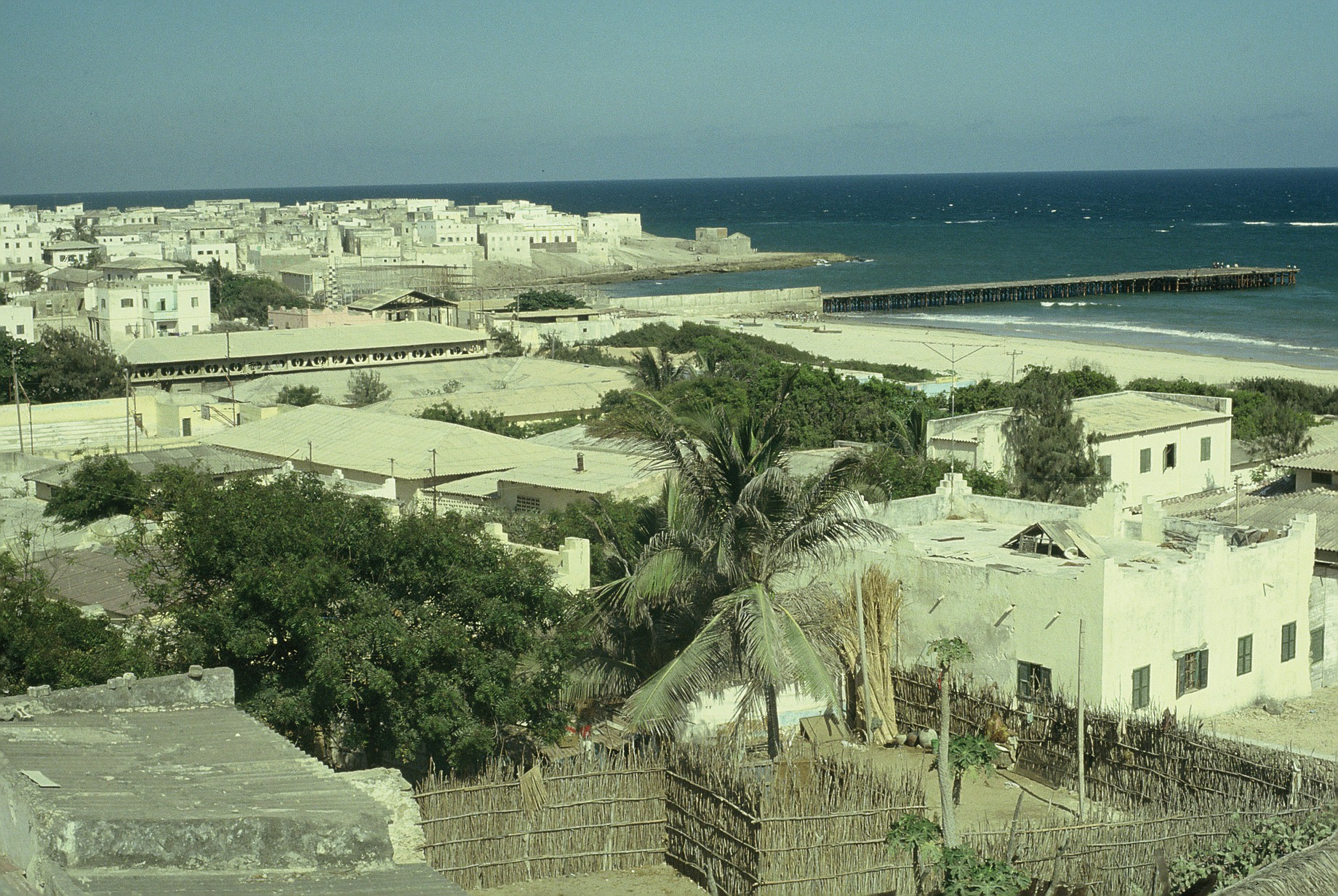
- The Merca harbor, showing the dock built in the 1930s

Location
- Country: Somalia
- Location: Merca
- Coordinates: 01°41′00″N 044°45′00″E
- UN/LOCODE: SOMER

Details
- Operated by: Merca Port Authority

The Port of Merca (Somali: Dekada Marka, Italian: Porto di Merca) also known as Merca Port, is the official seaport of Merca, situated in southeastern Somalia. It is classified as a jetty class port. It has a harbour as well as a pier which juts into the Somali Sea.

== History ==
Originally -and for many centuries- there were only fishing activities in the beach of the small coastal village now called Merca.

=== Porto di Merca ===
The port was a small fishing inlet in the early 1900s, but in the 1920s the Italian governor De Vecchi created a "real' port installation, called officially in Italian Porto di Merca, with a dock for ships for Italian Somalia exports of bananas.

In the late 1920s and mainly in the 1930s there was a colony of Italian settlers in the port-city of Merca, that was greatly improved. The Port of Merca was the second in Italian Somalia and was nicknamed "port of bananas" (porto bananiero) because from there was exported in those years the huge production of Somali bananas toward Italy and Europe.

In the city of Merca there was a huge economical development in the 1930s, due mainly to the growing commerce of the port of Merca connected by small railway to the farm area of Genale and Villabruzzi. During WWII some damages were done by the British to Merca and the port.

The "Giuliana Fassio" and other ships (from Italy to Somalia) mainly transported mechanical equipment, furniture, household appliances such as refrigerators and the first washing machines, cars and wine. After the landing of these products in Mogadishu, they continued on to Merca, an important port of call south of the capital and the first port for loading bananas. Not even here there was a real port and the boarding took place with the use of maone and the strength of the arms of a hundred Somalis who in a relatively short time and under the supervision of the crew carried out an operation that it was less simple than one might imagine, given the precautions that had to be taken to ensure that the bananas, once stowed with a specific criterion, reach their destination in the best possible way. Then another stop in Chisimaio, an important coastal emporium and crossroads of many communication routes that led to the large plantations in the interior of the country. Here the loading of the ship was completed and the first passengers of the return journey were embarked (in Chisimaio & Merca), to which would be added those who were waiting to board in Mogadishu.

The banana commerce continued in the first years after the war, mainly during the decade (1950-1960) of Italian Trusteeship of Somalia.

=== Merca port after WW2 ===
The port had a minor activity in the 1950s, 1960s and 1970s. The Port of Merca was destroyed during the civil war in the 1990s, with all the remaining facilities for exporting bananas.

The port of Merca (and the city) was abandoned by government forces and captured by Al-Shabaab in February 2016. It was recaptured by the Somali National Army along with African Union troops, a few days later. A small battle was fought in which a Somali soldier, several militants, and four civilians died.

== See also ==
- Transportation in Somalia
- Port of Mogadishu

== Bibliography ==
- Antonicelli, Franco. Trent'anni di storia italiana 1915 - 1945. Ed. Mondadori. Torino, 1961.
