= Action of 27 February 1941 =

1941 naval battle

- Part of the Indian Ocean theatre of the Second World War
- Maldive Islands (orthographic projection)
Date	27 February 1941
Location	off Maldives, Indian Ocean 1°0′N 68°30′E
Result	New Zealand victory

Belligerents
New Zealand	Italy

Commanders and leaders
Robert Bevan	Alfredo Bonezzi

Strength
Light cruiser HMS Leander	Auxiliary cruiser Ramb I

Casualties and losses
Leander slightly damaged	Ramb I sunk c. 150 killed 100 captured of whom: 4 wounded (1 died of wounds)

The Action of 27 February 1941 was a single ship action between the New Zealand crewed British cruiser HMS Leander and the Italian ship Ramb I, an auxiliary cruiser. It began when Leander ordered an un-flagged freighter to stop for an inspection. The freighter raised the Italian colours and engaged Leander which sank Ramb I shortly after. About 150 members of the crew were killed and 100 were rescued and taken to Addu Atoll, thence to Ceylon (now Sri Lanka). Leander patrolled southwards to investigate more reports of commerce raiders.

== Background ==
=== East African Campaign ===
In January 1941, British forces simultaneously advanced from Sudan and Kenya into Eritrea, Abyssinia and Italian Somaliland, as the navy blockaded and bombarded Italian harbours. The port of Kismayu in Italian Somaliland was occupied on 14 February and sixteen Italian and German ships there were sunk or captured, except for one vessel. Merka and Mogadishu were occupied on 25 February and several hundred Allied merchant sailors were liberated. As Allied forces closed on Massawa, the Italian Red Sea Flotilla was ordered to break out and run for friendly ports. A group of Italian vessels consisting of the colonial ship Eritrea and the auxiliary cruisers Ramb I (Lieutenant Commander Alfredo Bonezzi) and Ramb II attempted to operate as commerce raiders while en route to Japan. The Italian squadron managed to evade the British blockade on 20 February and scattered into the Indian Ocean, Ramb I heading for the Dutch East Indies.

=== HMS Leander ===
HMS Leander was the lead ship of the Leander class of light cruisers, armed with eight 6 in (150 mm) guns, ten 4 in (100 mm) guns, twelve .50 in (12.7 mm) Vickers machine guns in quadruple mounts and eight 21 in (530 mm) torpedo tubes. Leander had armour plating over her turrets, deck and magazines and a top speed of 32.5 kn (60.2 km/h; 37.4 mph).

=== Ramb I ===
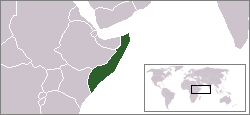
Location map of Italian Somaliland, 1940

Ramb I (3,667 gross register tons [GRT]), was 383 ft (117 m) long, 47 ft 11 in (14.61 m) wide at the beam, had a speed of 17 kn (31 km/h; 20 mph) and was a refrigerated merchant ship (reefer) built for the Regia Azienda Monopolio delle Banane (RAMB, the Royal Banana Monopoly Company) in 1933, adapted for naval service as an armed merchant cruiser. Ramb I was armed with two 120 mm (4.7 in) guns and eight 13.2 mm (0.52 in) anti-aircraft machine guns. Ramb I was much slower than Leander, with a maximum speed of 18.5 kn (34.3 km/h; 21.3 mph). The ship had departed Suez on 10 June 1940 for Massawa on the Red Sea coast, from where the ship made short cruises along the coast of Eritrea but was mainly used for anti-aircraft defence of the port. As British, Commonwealth and Imperial troops neared the port, Ramb I and Coburg (7,400 GRT), a German freighter, escaped from Massawa on the night of 20/21 February 1941 and passed into the Gulf of Aden. One ship was sighted near the island of Socotra off the Horn of Africa but it was considered too dangerous a location to attack.

== Prelude ==
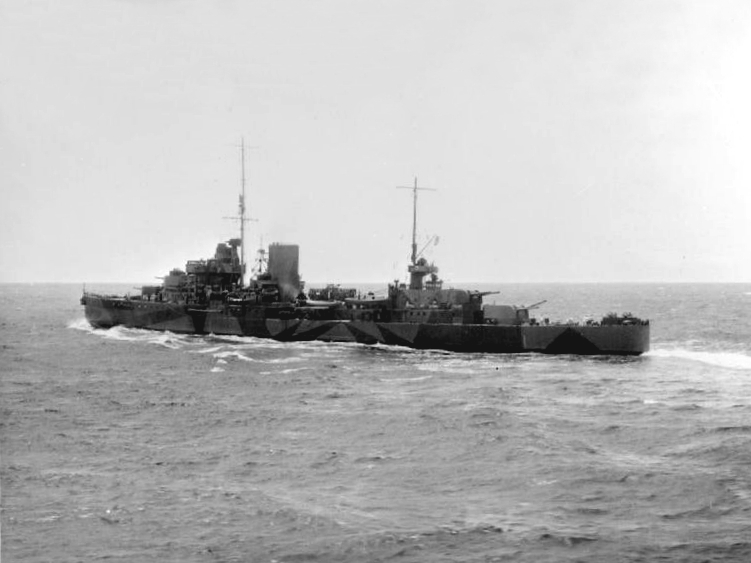
HMS Leander

Acting on reports of commerce raiders in the area, Leander detached from Convoy US 9 off Bombay on 22 February, passing west of the Laccadive and Maldive islands to a patrol area west of Huvadhu Kandu (One and a Half Degree Channel). At 7:00 a.m. on 27 February, Leander was steaming east, about 28 nmi (52 km; 32 mi) north of the equator and 320 nmi (590 km; 370 mi) west of the Maldives (01° N, 68° 30′ E). Captain Robert Bevan altered course to the north to head for One and a Half Degree Channel, because news of the capture of Mogadishu in Italian Somaliland (now Somalia) had been received by radio on the previous day. Italian ships in the port might have sailed along that route for the Far East.

== Action ==
At 10:37 a.m., a ship was sighted ahead and Leander increased speed to 23 kn (43 km/h; 26 mph), gradually overhauling the vessel. As Leander closed, a gun was seen on the ship's forecastle and the silhouette of the ship resembled an Italian Ramb-class fruit carrier. Leander went to action stations at 11:15 a.m. and when ordered to identify themselves ten minutes later, the crew of the vessel hoisted a British merchant flag. When ordered to give its signal letters, the crew hoisted four letters which were not listed in British signal books. Leander made the secret challenge but received no reply and the ship maintained its course and speed. A boarding party stood by and at 11:45 a.m., the ship was ordered to stop instantly but no reply was received. A few minutes later, the ship hoisted the Italian merchant flag and trained its guns on Leander. The cruiser was broad on the beam of the Italian ship and at 3,000 yd (1.5 nmi; 1.7 mi; 2.7 km) was an easy target for its guns and torpedoes. At 11:53 a.m., the Italian ship opened fire and thirty seconds later, Leander replied. The Italian fire was inaccurate and it was estimated that only about three shells were fired from each gun.

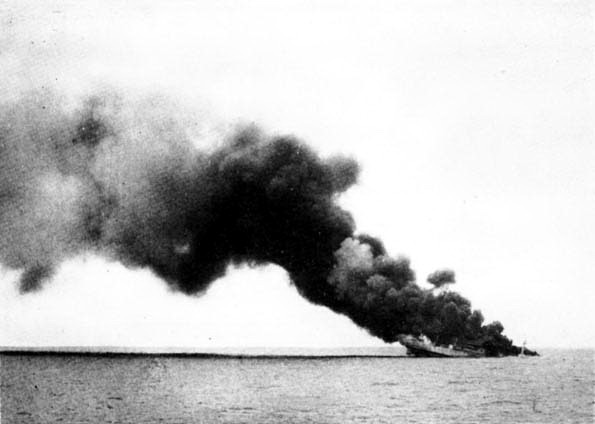
Ramb I sinking, February 1941

A few shell splinters hit Leander, which fired five salvos in a minute, then ceased fire to observe results. Leander made the flag signal "Do you surrender?", the merchant flag was seen to be lowered and the crew began to abandon ship. Leander had hit the ship several times in the forepart and a fire burned, visible through a large hole in the side. A boat was lowered from Leander with a boarding party to try to save the ship and two lifeboats were seen leaving the vessel as other men jumped overboard or scrambled down the side. An Italian officer in the water called out that the boarding party should not approach the ship, as it was burning and laden with ammunition. The boarding party laid off and as the fire spread, a big explosion before the bridge shot flames and smoke high into the sky, the ship settling bows first. As the fire burned, there was another explosion and five minutes later the ship sank under a cloud of black smoke. Leander recovered the boarding party and the Italian lifeboats, while edging away.

== Aftermath ==
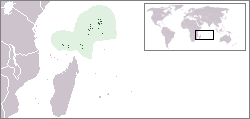
Location of the Seychelles (Madagascar to the south, Africa to the west)

Prisoners said that Ramb I had been badly damaged by the shell hits and as Leander closed, the order to abandon ship had been given. Leander proceeded eastwards and arrived at Addu Atoll the next morning.

=== Casualties ===
About a hundred and fifty Italians were killed in the engagement and a hundred men survived, of whom one man was seriously wounded and four were slightly injured. (Note: In 2006, Roger Jordan recorded c. 150 men killed, which has been preferred as a later source.) The seriously wounded man died in surgery during the afternoon and was buried at sunset. The Italian prisoners were transferred to the oiler Pearleaf with an armed guard and the ship made for Colombo, Ceylon (now Sri Lanka).

=== Subsequent operations ===
Leander was sent to investigate indications from wireless direction-finding that Axis ships were in the vicinity of the Saya de Malha Bank, several hundred miles south-east of the Seychelles Islands and north-east of Madagascar. MV Coburg (7,400 GRT) with a prize, Ketty Brøvig (7,031 GRT), a Norwegian tanker, that had been captured by the commerce raider Atlantis on 2 February 1941, were discovered. The ships were spotted south-east of the Seychelles by a Walrus amphibious reconnaissance aircraft from HMAS Canberra. The ships were scuttled on 4 March 1941 at 04° 50′ S; 56° 00′ E, when Canberra and Leander approached them.
