= Genale =

Historical town in southeastern Lower Shebelle, Somaliland

Coordinates: 1°48′N 44°42′E

Genale was a town founded by Italian colonists in the southeastern Lower Shabelle region of Italian Somaliland. It is now called Janale.

== History ==
Genale was created in 1924 by a group of Italian settlers from the Italian city of Turin, with the supervision of the Italian governor of the colony. Near the Genale of the colonists and separated by the Shebelle river, soon grew a bigger city populated by Somalis (working as cheap labor force in the plantations): the actual Janale. After World War II remained only Janaale, while Genale disappeared when the defeated Italians moved away from Somalia.

In 1924, indeed it was started the Italian colonization of the area of Genale, in southern Somalia, forming a group of small and medium-sized farms. Most settlers consisted of old fascist militants of Turin who had followed in this Italian colony the new governor of Somalia, Cesare Maria De Vecchi. The first informal association between farmers, however, arose only in 1928. The main crop of the area was cotton and was done by small farms owned by those Italian settlers: about one hundred with an area varying between 75 and 600 hectares (with an average that oscillated about 200) with a total area of about 20,000 hectares. At least until 1931, cotton was the main crop, later replaced by banana production, whose harvest was sold to the Italian State, that did the marketing in Italy as a monopoly.

During the Italian colonial period Genale was the center of a vast area of agricultural concessions of 20,000 hectares for the cultivation of banana, cotton and other subsidiaries. The bananas were marketed by the Royal Banana Monopoly (abbreviated RAMB) that had, in fact, a monopoly of the export to Italy granted in order to safeguard banana production in Somalia on the Italian market. Consequently, until the 1950s all the bananas consumed in Italy came from the area of Genale.

The cultivation was made possible by a large dam in the river Shebelle, and by a vast network of canals built between 1924 and 1926. Given the importance of the area it was created, from the administrative point of view, the Vicecommissariato di Genale with "Vittorio di Africa" as capital (currently "Scialambod"), where industrial activities were focused also for the processing of agricultural products.

It is noteworthy to pinpoint that in 1939 Italian Somalia nearly all the development was concentrated in the triangle "Genale-Villabruzzi-Mogadiscio".

The center of Genale is a few kilometers inland from Merca which is its port (being Janale landlocked). During the period dell'A.F.I.S. (Trust Territory of Somaliland) in the 1950s and 1960, the "Consortium of farmer-dealers" was reinforced, but in the late 1970s started to lose importance and in the 1990s disappeared.

Politician Aden Adde had a farm in the town.

== Demographics ==
In the Italian Genale there were in 1940 nearly 500 Italian Somalis, but after WWII nearly all of them moved away and since the 1980s no one has remained. The city actually has 8000 inhabitants (of whom nearly one thousand are descendants from Italians and Somalian girls) and is predominantly inhabited by people from the Somali ethnic group, with the Dir Biimaal clan well-represented.

== Bibliography ==
- De Vecchi di Val Cismon, Cesare. Relazione sul progetto di Bilancio della Somalia Italiana per l'esercizio finanziario 1927-1928.
