= Italian auxiliary cruiser Ramb III =

1930s Italian reefer ship

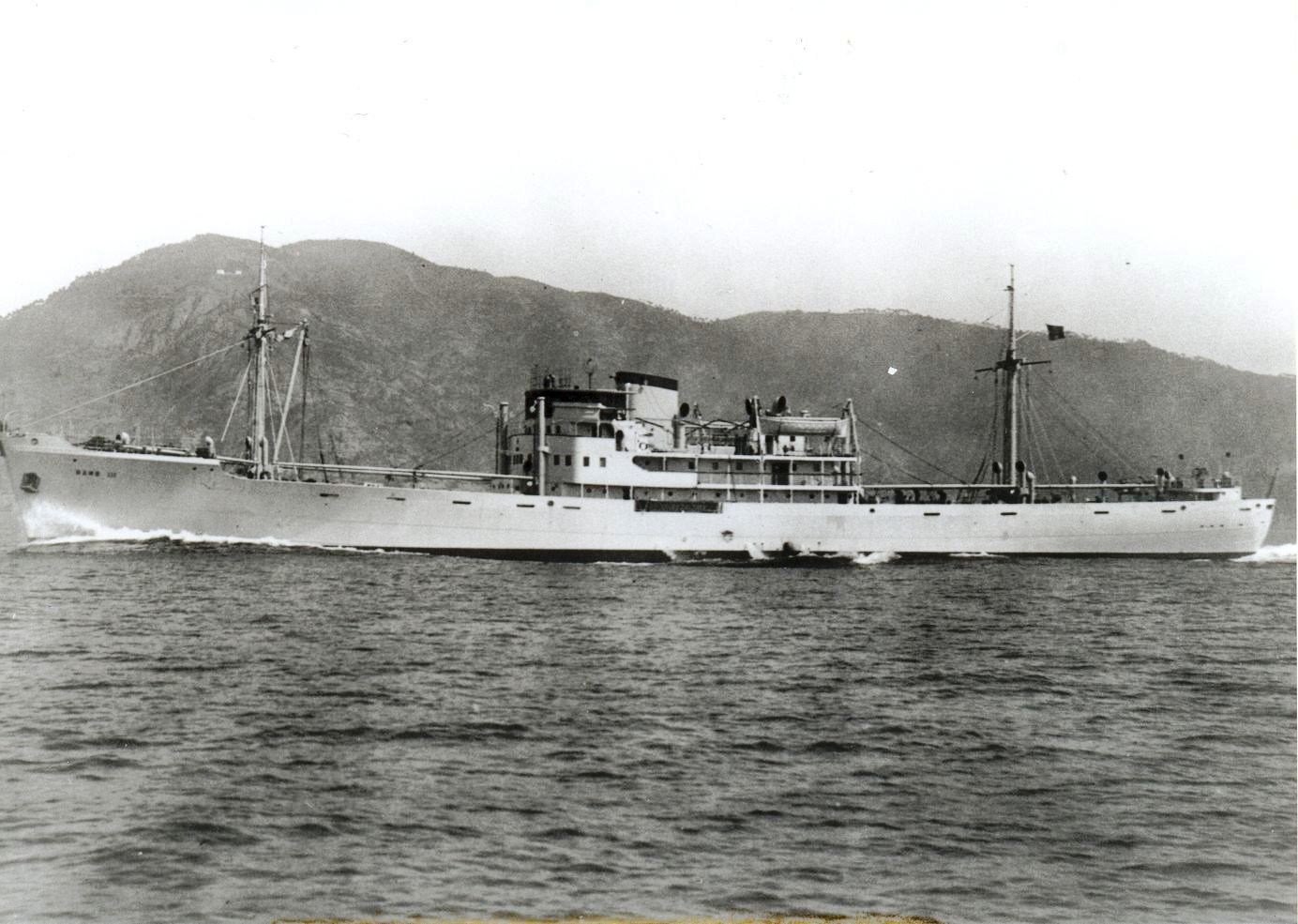

History

Italy
- Name: Ramb III
- Builder: Ansaldo, Genoa
- Launched: 6 March 1938 Banana boat
- Commissioned: 1940
- Reclassified: Convoy escort, 1940
- Home port: Massawa, Eritrea
- Fate: Seized by Germany, 9 September 1943

Germany
- Name: Kiebitz
- Reclassified: Minelayer
- Fate: Sunk in Rijeka harbor, November 1944

SFR Yugoslavia
- Name: Galeb
- Acquired: Refloated, post-war
- Decommissioned: 1992
- Reclassified: Training ship and presidential yacht, 1952
- Status: Museum ship

General characteristics
- Type: Auxiliary cruiser
- Displacement: 3,667 long tons (3,726 t)
- Speed: 18.5 knots (21.3 mph; 34.3 km/h)
- Armament: 4 × 120 mm (4.7 in) guns; 2 × 13.2 mm (0.52 in) anti-aircraft guns

The Italian auxiliary cruiser Ramb III was built at Genoa by Ansaldo in 1938.

Ramb III was the third of four sister reefer ships all built to the same design. The other ships were the Ramb I, the Ramb II, and the Ramb IV. The four ships were built for the Royal Banana Monopoly Business (Regia Azienda Monopolio Banane). These ships were originally built to be "banana boats", built for transporting refrigerated bananas to Europe from Somaliland and Eritrea in Italian East Africa.

However, in the event of war, the design of Ramb III allowed it to be refitted for commerce raiding. She was 3,667 tons displacement, oil powered and capable of 18½ knots.

== Convoy escort ==
When Italy declared war on 10 June 1940, she was the only ship in the class in home waters. After being requisitioned by the Italian Royal Navy (Regia Marina), Ramb III served as a convoy escort. Like Ramb I and Ramb II, Ramb III was refitted and armed with four 4.7-inch (120 mm) guns and two 13.2 mm anti-aircraft guns.

On 12 November 1940, during the raid on the Italian port of Taranto, the British Royal Navy detached a cruiser division with accompanying destroyers for a quick swing through the lower Adriatic Sea. This force found a small convoy of four Italian merchant ships escorted by Ramb III and the torpedo boat Nicola Fabrizi. The ships were bound for Brindisi from Vlorë. Ramb III fired 19 salvos in its own defense and succeeded in breaking away without suffering any damage. The Fabrizi stayed with the merchant ships and fought a close action with the British force. As a result, the Fabrizi was hit immediately and suffered serious damage. The Fabrizi continued to fight back until being disabled by the cruisers' fire. After the Fabrizi was neutralized, the British force sank all four of the Italian merchant vessels. This action took place near the Strait of Otranto.

Ramb III capacity for 2,418 ton of either refrigerated or general cargo saw her involved in convoy activity both to the Dodecanese and North Africa during the 1940–1941 winter, in her role of armed transport ship.

On 10 May 1941 Ramb III was torpedoed by the British submarine Triumph in Benghazi harbour. She was salvaged by the Italians and towed back to Trieste.

== Kiebitz ==
On 9 September 1943 Ramb III was seized by German troops at Trieste. Refitted as a minelayer and pressed into the service of the Kriegsmarine, Ramb III was renamed Kiebitz. As a minelayer she laid over 5,000 mines in the Adriatic Sea until she ran into one of her own mines off Ancona. Running astern, she reached Rijeka with no further damage, where Allied aircraft sank her in November 1944. During attempts to put out the fire, two firefighters from Rijeka, Mario Zele and Ulff Angelo Fuzini, died.

== Galeb ==
After the war, Kiebitz was refloated by the Brodospas. She was converted at Pula into a training ship in 1952 and renamed Galeb ("seagull"). Ultimately the Galeb became the presidential yacht for President Josip Broz Tito. In this service, with her appearance greatly altered from her original incarnation as Ramb III, she served for 40 years. She is in display at the Port of Rijeka as a museum ship.

== Bibliography ==
- Alton, Dave (2006). "Question 15/03: Italian Warship Losses". Warship International. XLIII (1): 32–33. ISSN 0043-0374.
- Freivogel, Zvonimir (2006). "Into History Under Three Names: Ramb III – Kiebitz – Galeb". Warship International. XLIII (2): 169–182. ISSN 0043-0374.
