= RFNS Timo =

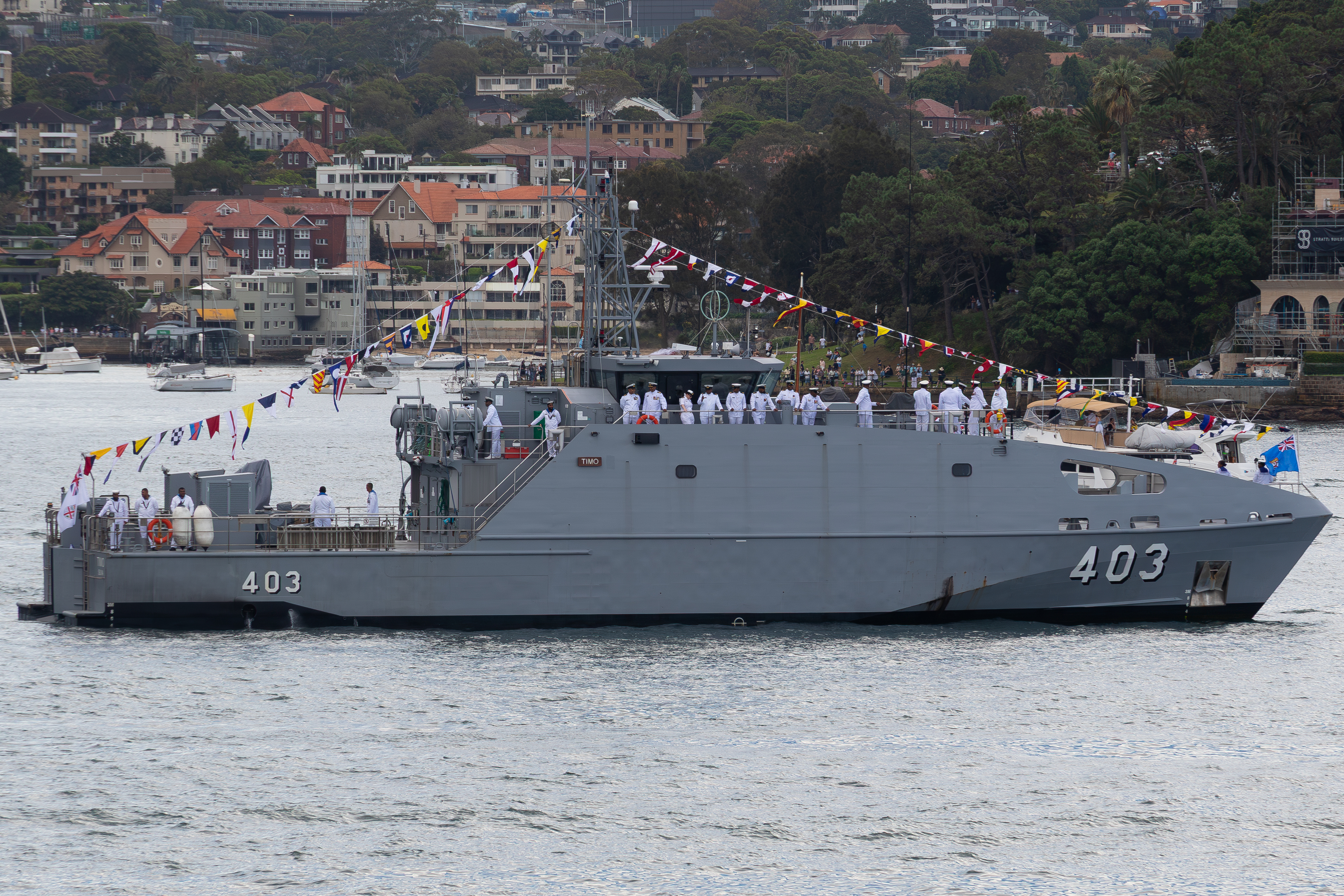
- RFNS Timo partaking in the 2026 Exercise Kakadu Fleet Review.

History

Fiji
- Name: Timo
- Namesake: Timo Puamau
- Builder: Austal
- Acquired: 22 November 2026
- Identification: IMO number: 4736516; MMSI number: 520465000
- Status: Active

General characteristics
- Class & type: Guardian-class patrol boat
- Length: 39.5 m (129 ft 7 in)
- Beam: 8 m (26 ft 3 in)
- Draft: 0.76 m (2.5 ft)
- Propulsion: 2 × Caterpillar 3516C diesel engines, 2 shafts
- Speed: 20 knots (37 km/h; 23 mph)
- Range: 3,000 nmi (5,600 km; 3,500 mi) at 12 knots (22 km/h; 14 mph)
- Armament: Australia provides the ships without armament, but they are designed to be able to mount heavy machine guns, or an autocannon of up to 30 mm on the foredeck

RFNS Timo (403) is a Guardian-class patrol boat of the Republic of Fiji Navy. She replaced RFNS Puamau, another Guardian-class patrol boat after she ran aground in 2024. The vessel was commissioned on 22 November 2024. The vessel is named after Able Seaman Timo Puamau, who was killed whilst serving aboard the Lender-class light cruiser HMNZS Leander during World War II.

== Design ==
Timo is a Guardian-class patrol boat, a design based on previous vessels built for the Royal Australian Navy and Australian Border Force by Austal. RFNS Timo is 39.5 meters (129 ft 7 in) long overall, with a beam of 8 meters (26 ft 3 in) and a loaded draft of 2.5 meters (8 ft 2 in). Timo is powered by two Caterpillar 3516C diesel engines with two ZF7600 gearboxes turning two fixed pitch propellers creating 4,000 kW. Timo has a maximum speed of 20 knots (37 km/h; 23 mph) and a range of 3,000 nautical miles (5,600 km; 3,500 mi) at 12 knots (22 km/h; 14 mph). The Australian government provided the ship without armaments; however, the Guardian-class patrol boat is designed to mount multiple heavy machine guns, or an auto-cannon of up to 30 mm on the foredeck. The ship can accommodate a crew complement of 23.

== Operational career ==
RFNS Timo was handed over to the Fijian government in a commissioning ceremony held at the Henderson shipyard on 22 November 2024, as part of the Pacific Maritime Security Program.

In December 2024, RFNS Timo was damaged while mooring at RFNS Stanley Brown Wharf. The vessel sustained minor damage on her port side. The incident was caused in part due to high winds and confined docking space with limited clearance due to other commercial vessels in the area, however, the Republic of Fiji Navy did not rule out potential unprofessional conduct on part of the ship's crew.

In March 2026, RFNS Timo participated in the Exercise Kakadu Fleet Review in Sydney harbour.

== See also ==
- RFNS Puamau
- Guardian-class patrol boat
