= Ganale Doria =

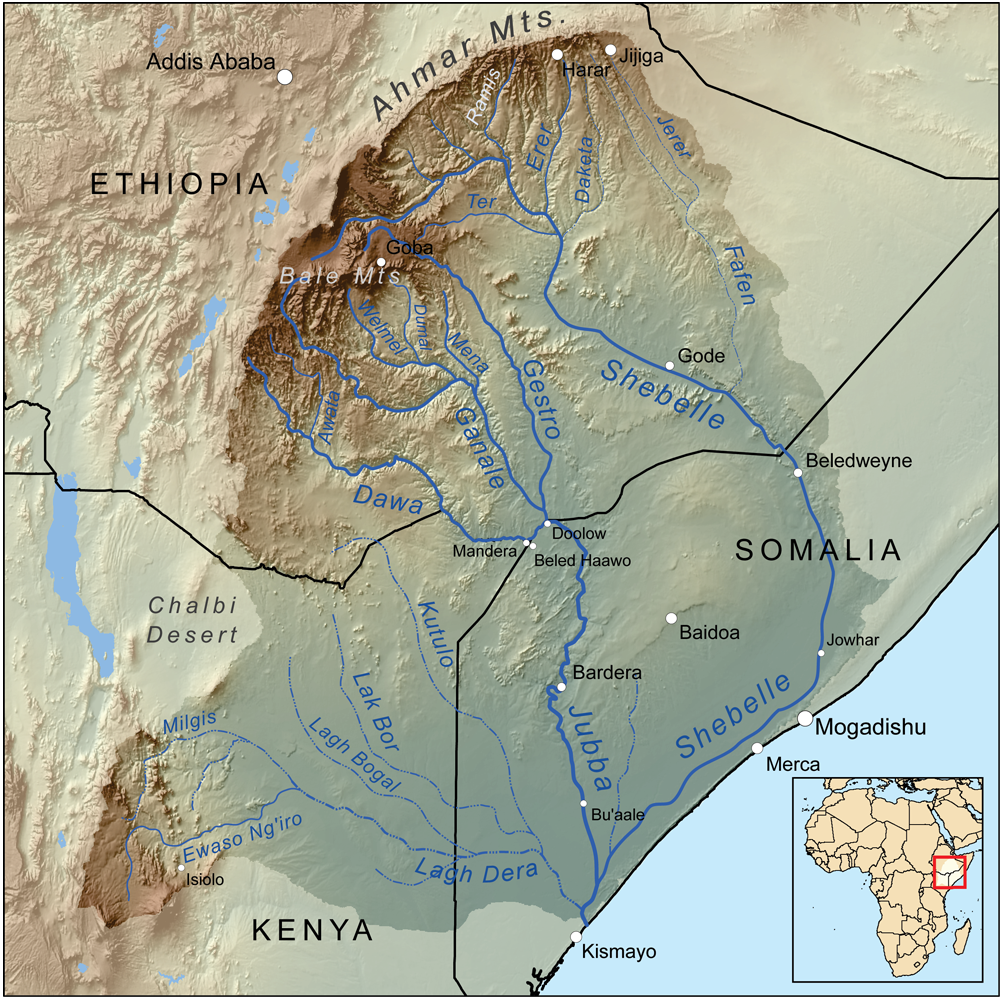
The dam is located exactly at the end of the Shebelle river, blocking the loss of water in the dunes by sun evaporation during summer

Ganale Doria is a dam located near Genale on the river Shabelle. It was built in the south of Somalia in the 1920s along with an extensive network of canals. The dam (called originally Dam of Genale Doria) was strongly promoted by Cesare Maria De Vecchi - Italian governor of Italian Somalia from 1924 to 1928 - in order to provide water for irrigation of a vast territory between Genale, Merca and Vittorio di Africa, to be given in concession to colonists.

== The dam ==
The Genale Dam should be remembered not so much for the intrinsic importance (though fairly innovative by the 1920s, being built with reinforced concrete) but especially for the difficulties in the realization and for the great improvements for the social and economic life of the area. The dam also improved the image of colonial Italy in the world.

Regarding the construction difficulties, the following are only the most significant among those that had to be overcome by the Italian builders, according to Gaetano De Angelis:

- The weather was inclement with frequent floods of the river, which naturally slowed the process and forced to work often 24 hours a day and with artificial light rather poor.
- The foundation ground was muddy and forced to work with the nearly continuous use of pumps.
- There were no cranes, excavators etc.: the work was done with shovels, buckets and especially "man strength". At certain times to remove 40,000 cubic meters of soil worked together more than 1,000 indigenous workers.
- The material necessary to the work came from Mogadishu, mainly for the iron and timber needed. The bulk (crushed stone, cement, sand, etc.) came from Merca (about 14 km away) and because to reach this small town there was the need to bypass interposed moving sand dunes (in the 1920s there were no roads there), transportation was done with "caravans" of camels because the trucks could not be used. So, were required 120,000 transports by camel (or a caravan of 350-400 camels per day for the duration of the work).

Construction began in January 1926 and despite the difficulties mentioned, ended in October of the same year. The inauguration took place on October 28, 1926 (anniversary of Fascism in Italy) and was christened by the countess Rina De Vecchi of Val Cismon, to whom the workers made homage of the model of the dam.

Actually for some experts (like Tripodi) the question arises how it all could get to the end in such a short time and without major incidents: no loss of life happened. Fascist propaganda pinpointed that the dam was done without enhancing the distinction of class or color - although the work was done in very difficult conditions.

== Data ==
The Shebelle ("river of leopards" in Somali), in the area of Genale where the dam was built, flows in a vast plain between 65–70 meters above sea level and is 13.5 km from the Indian Ocean (point of minimum distance, near Merca). Between the plain and the sea, however, there are sand dunes that are partly movable and rise in height up to 100–130 meters above sea level by preventing the river flowing into the Indian Ocean and forcing it to get to the Jubba river: there the Shebelle river flows only in the rainy periods because normally the water disperses before reaching the Jubba, forming swampy areas.

Until a few years before the intervention in this stretch of plain, although composed of fertile land, there were mainly shrubs and bushes of various tree species. Furthermore, mainly along the banks of the river, there were small groups of huts and little land cultivated by the natives.

In periods of peak demand of water for irrigation, the flow of the river was over 100 m^{3} per second; therefore - if the dam subtracted from that amount the flow rate of 40 m^{3}/s necessary to irrigate 25-30,000 hectares of land, that were supposed to be the area of agricultural concessions - this fact did not let dry the Shebelle river.

The water flow of the river went down below 40 m^{3}/s only during periods when irrigation did not appear necessary (from January to March). For this reason, the dam was not built with the task of accumulation of water but was to serve as a weir or "intake structure" - to send water toward the distribution channels - to a level quota to allow the water to reach the whole area.

The water channeling - for an initial length of 45 km, that later reached 80 km - is separated upstream of the dam, redistributing into two basic channels:

- A first, called "main" channel, with a capacity of 25 m^{3}/s (and a trapezoid section) with an average width of 13.5 m and 3 m deep.
- A second, called "1st secondary", with a capacity of 15 m^{3}/s (and a trapezoid section) with an average width of 8 m and 3 m deep.

== See also ==
- Italian Somalia
- Genale
- Vittorio di Africa

== Notes ==
- Location of Buundada Janaale (Janaale Bridge) on Wikimapia: Coordinates 1°48'28"N 44°41'19"E

== Bibliography ==
- De Angelis, Gaetano. Le opere italiane nelle Colonie. La diga di Genale per la derivazione dell'Uebi Scebeli da L'Ingegnere – Rivista tecnica – Volume I N° 5 Novembre 1927 pag. 248-254.
- De Vecchi di Val Cismon, Cesare. Relazione sul progetto di Bilancio della Somalia Italiana per l'esercizio finanziario 1927-1928.
- Tripodi, Paolo. The Colonial Legacy in Somalia. St. Martin's P Inc. New York, 1999.
