= Royal Banana Monopoly =

Royal Banana Monopoly RAMB
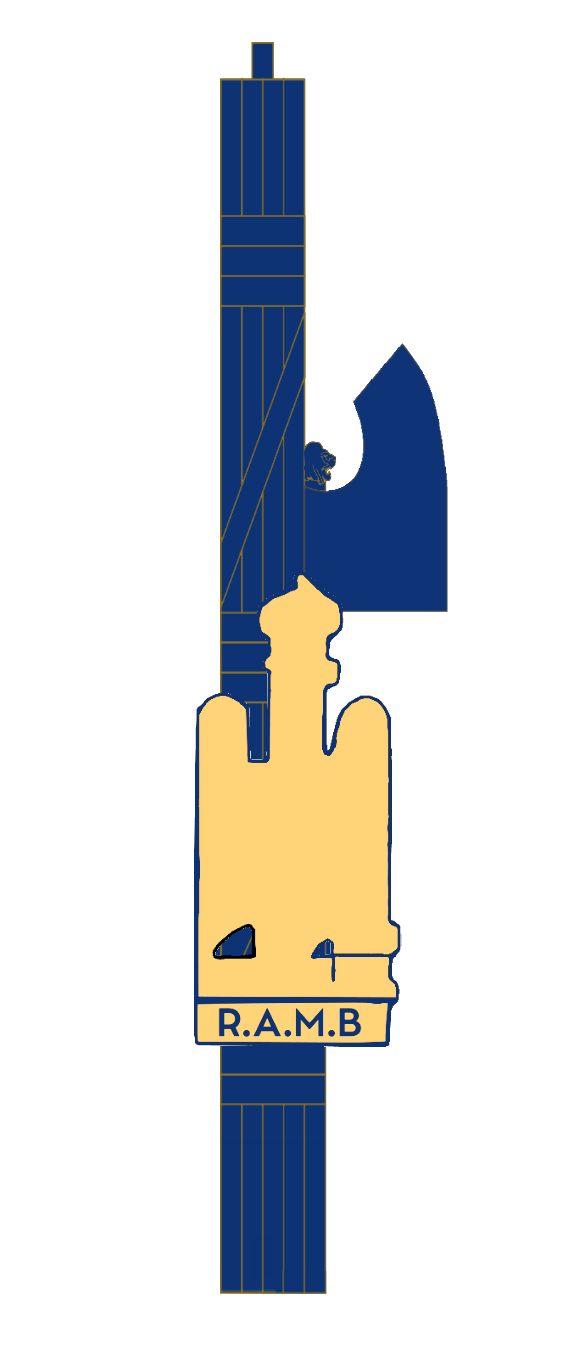
- Native name: Italian: Regia Azienda Monopolio Banane
- Founded: 2 December 1935
- Defunct: 1946 (reestablished 1950)
- Headquarters: Mogadiscio, Italian Somaliland
- Area served: Italian Empire

The Royal Banana Monopoly (Italian: Regia Azienda Monopolio Banane, RAMB) was a state-owned enterprise founded in Mogadishu in 1935 to transport and market bananas harvested in Italian Somaliland throughout the rest of the Italian Empire, directly under the control of the Colonial Ministry. Even if the last transport of bananas to Italy happened in early 1940, it survived the first years of WW2 – and officially lasted until 1946.

== History ==
When the price of cotton plummeted after 1929, bananas became the most profitable crop in the empire. The RAMB had a small fleet of seven ships, including four newly commissioned banana boats which transported bananas quickly from the Horn of Africa to Europe. The RAMB worked directly with Italian banana producers in Giuba and Genale, who were represented by the Federation of Banana Growers of Somalia (FEBAS).

In 1939, 450,000 tn of bananas were transported to Italy by the four RAMB ships ("Ramb I, "Ramb II", "Ramb III","Ramb IV") and three other cargo ships (the "Capitan Cecchi", the "Capitan Bottego" and the "Duca degli Abruzzi").

Following Italy's entry into World War II, the banana boats were reclassified for naval use and saw service off the coast of Africa and in the Mediterranean. Of its seven ships, only Ramb III survived the war and was converted to a personal yacht for Josip Broz Tito, president of SFR Yugoslavia.

After Italy regained administrative control of Somalia in 1950, the government reactivated the Banana Monopoly as the Azienda Monopolio Banana (AMB) with the intent of revitalizing the heavily damaged agricultural industry. The AMB continued to regulate the price and marketing of bananas in Somalia until its dissolution in 1964, four years after the country gained independence.

== Fleet ==
Fleet
Image	Name	Commissioned	GRT	Notes
	Ramb I	6 December 1937	3,666	Sunk, 27 February 1941
	Ramb II	6 September 1937	3,676	Sunk, 12 January 1945
	Ramb III	1937	3,675	Refloated post-war and reclassified as Yugoslav training ship Galeb
	Ramb IV	1937	3,667	Sunk while under Japanese control, 10 May 1942
	Duca degli Abruzzi	1933	2,314	Scuttled, May 8, 1942
	Capitano Bottego	1933	2,316	Sunk, April 6, 1941
	Capitano A. Cecchi	1934	2,320	Sunk, May 8, 1941

== Bibliography ==
- Guida dell'Africa Orientale, C.T.I., Milano 1938.
- Calendario Atlante De Agostini, Novara 1960.
- Banane Fasciste: breve storia della banana italica ai tempi dell'autarchia, Sergio Salvi, Affinità Elettive ed., Ancona 2018.
