= Italian hospital ship Ramb IV =

20th century Italian hospital ship

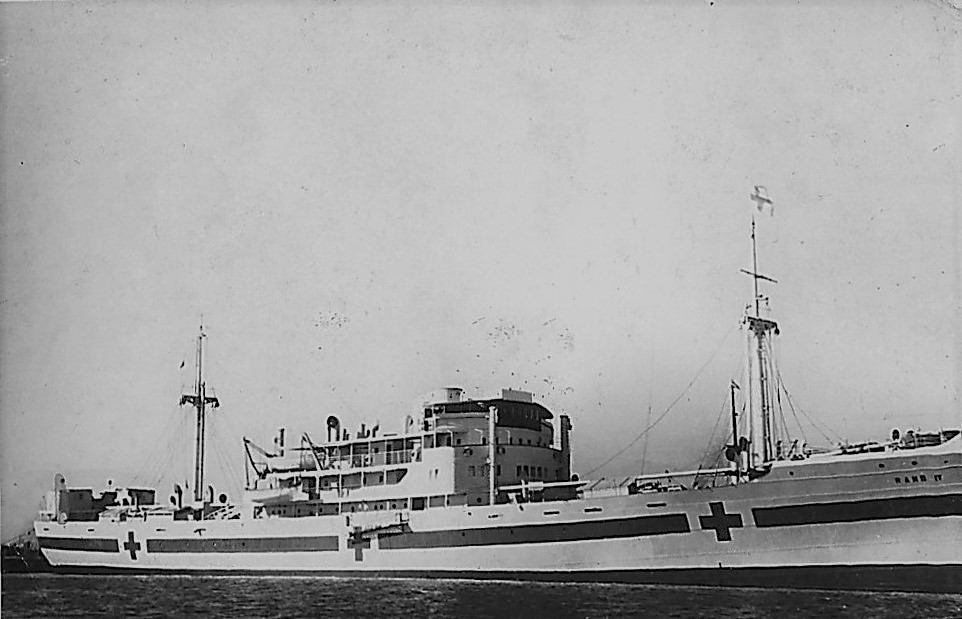
- Ramb IV in 1941

History

Italy
- Name: Ramb IV
- Builder: CRDA, Monfalcone
- Yard number: 1201
- Launched: 7 June 1937 Banana boat,
- Commissioned: 1940
- Reclassified: Hospital ship, 1940
- Home port: Massawa, Eritrea
- Fate: Captured by the British, 10 April 1941

United Kingdom
- Name: HMS Ramb IV
- Acquired: 10 April 1941
- Fate: Sunk by bombs, 10 May 1942

General characteristics
- Type: Hospital ship
- Tonnage: 3,667 GRT; 2,179 NRT
- Length: 383 ft 2 in (116.79 m)
- Beam: 49 ft 7 in (15.11 m)
- Depth: 24 ft 8 in (7.52 m)
- Installed power: 1525 Nhp
- Propulsion: 2 × 9-cylinder FIAT marine Diesel engines; twin screws
- Speed: 18.5 knots (21.3 mph; 34.3 km/h) (maximum); 17.0 knots (19.6 mph; 31.5 km/h) (cruising)
- Capacity: 2418 GRT; 12 passengers
- Complement: 120

Service record
- Part of: Red Sea Flotilla

Ramb IV was an Italian hospital ship, built at Monfalcone by the United Yards of the Adriatic (Cantieri Riuniti dell'Adriatico, CRDA) in 1938. She was the last of four sister ships all built to the same design. The other ships were the Ramb I, Ramb II, and the Ramb III. The four ships were built for the Royal Banana Monopoly Business (Regia Azienda Monopolio Banane). These ships were originally devised as "banana boats" for transporting refrigerated bananas from Somaliland and Eritrea in Italian East Africa.

In the event of war, the design of Ramb IV allowed it to be refitted as an "auxiliary cruiser" for commerce raiding. She was 3,667 tons displacement, oil powered, and capable of 18.5 knots (34.3 km/h) knots. Following a declaration of war, Ramb IV was capable of being armed with two 120-millimetre (4.7 in) guns and eight 13.2 mm (0.52 in) anti-aircraft guns and of becoming an auxiliary cruiser.

Instead, Ramb IV was converted into a hospital ship for the Italian Royal Navy (Regia Marina). The goal of Ramb IV, in case of fall of Eritrea, was transporting Italian wounded back to Italy. However, this mission was impossible because of the British control of the Suez Canal. In addition, it would have been suicide to attempt to round the Cape of Good Hope and enter the Mediterranean Sea past Gibraltar. The work to convert the banana boat to a hospital ship was performed at the Eritrean port of Massawa. Ramb IV was part of the Italian Navy's Red Sea Flotilla.

When the port of Massawa fell on 10 April 1941 during the East African Campaign, the British captured Ramb IV. Pressed into British service, she then operated in the Red Sea and later off Libya. Ramb IV was bombed and set afire by German aircraft and sank off Alexandria in Egypt on 10 May 1942.

== See also ==
- Ramb I
- Ramb II
- Ramb III
- Italian Royal Navy - RN Ramb IV and Aquileia
- East African Campaign

== Bibliography ==
- Alton, Dave (2006). "Question 15/03: Italian Warship Losses". Warship International. XLIII (1): 32–33. ISSN 0043-0374.
