= Italian sloop Eritrea =

Colonial ship of the Italian Regia Marina

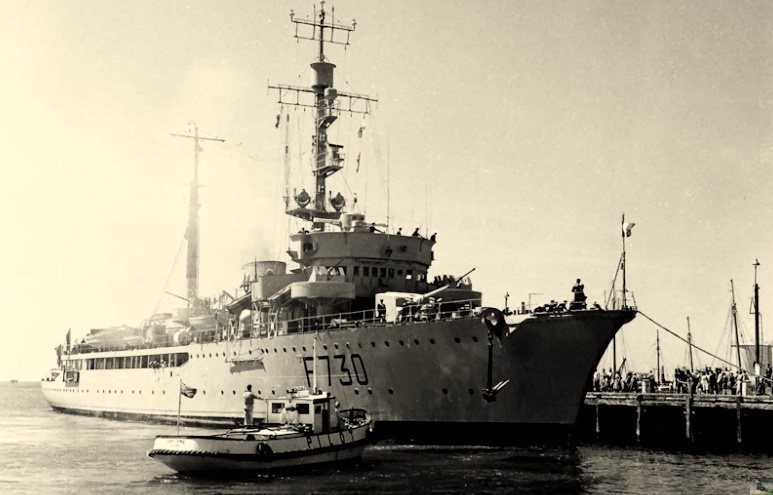
- Francis Garnier

History

Italy
- Name: Eritrea
- Ordered: 8 May 1935
- Launched: 28 September 1936
- Completed: 10 February 1937
- Fate: Transferred to France 1948

France
- Name: Francis Garnier
- Namesake: Francis Garnier
- Acquired: 12 February 1948
- Stricken: 1966
- Fate: Sunk as target ship 1966

General characteristics
- Type: Colonial ship
- Displacement: 2,165 long tons (2,200 t) standard; 3,068 long tons (3,117 t) full load
- Length: 96.9 m (317 ft 11 in)
- Beam: 13.3 m (43 ft 8 in)
- Draught: 4.7 m (15 ft 5 in)
- Propulsion: 2-shaft diesel-electric, 7,800 hp diesel, 1,300 hp electric motors
- Speed: 20 knots (23 mph; 37 km/h)
- Range: 6,950 nmi (12,870 km)
- Complement: 234
- Armament: 4 × 120 mm (4.7 in) guns (2 × 2); 2 × Vickers-Terni 40 mm/39 pom pom (2 × 1); 4 × 13.2 mm (0.52 in) machine guns (4 × 1)
- Armour: Deck: 25 to 32 mm (0.98 to 1.26 in); Conning tower: 100 mm (4 in)

Eritrea was a colonial ship of the Italian Regia Marina constructed in the Castellammare Shipyards near Naples. Construction started in 1935 and she was commissioned in 1937. She served mainly in the Indian and western Pacific Oceans.

== Design ==
The Eritrea (2,170 tons displacement) was constructed for duties as a typical "colonial ship" and was sometimes referred to as a "sloop". She had a novel diesel-electric machinery outfit designed to maximise range.

She was armed with four 120 mm guns, two 40 mm guns, and two 13.2 mm machine guns. The ship also had an extensive engineering workshop on board and could provide repair support to Italian submarines based in East Africa.

A modified sister ship to be called Etiopia was planned, but cancelled on the outbreak of war.

== Service ==
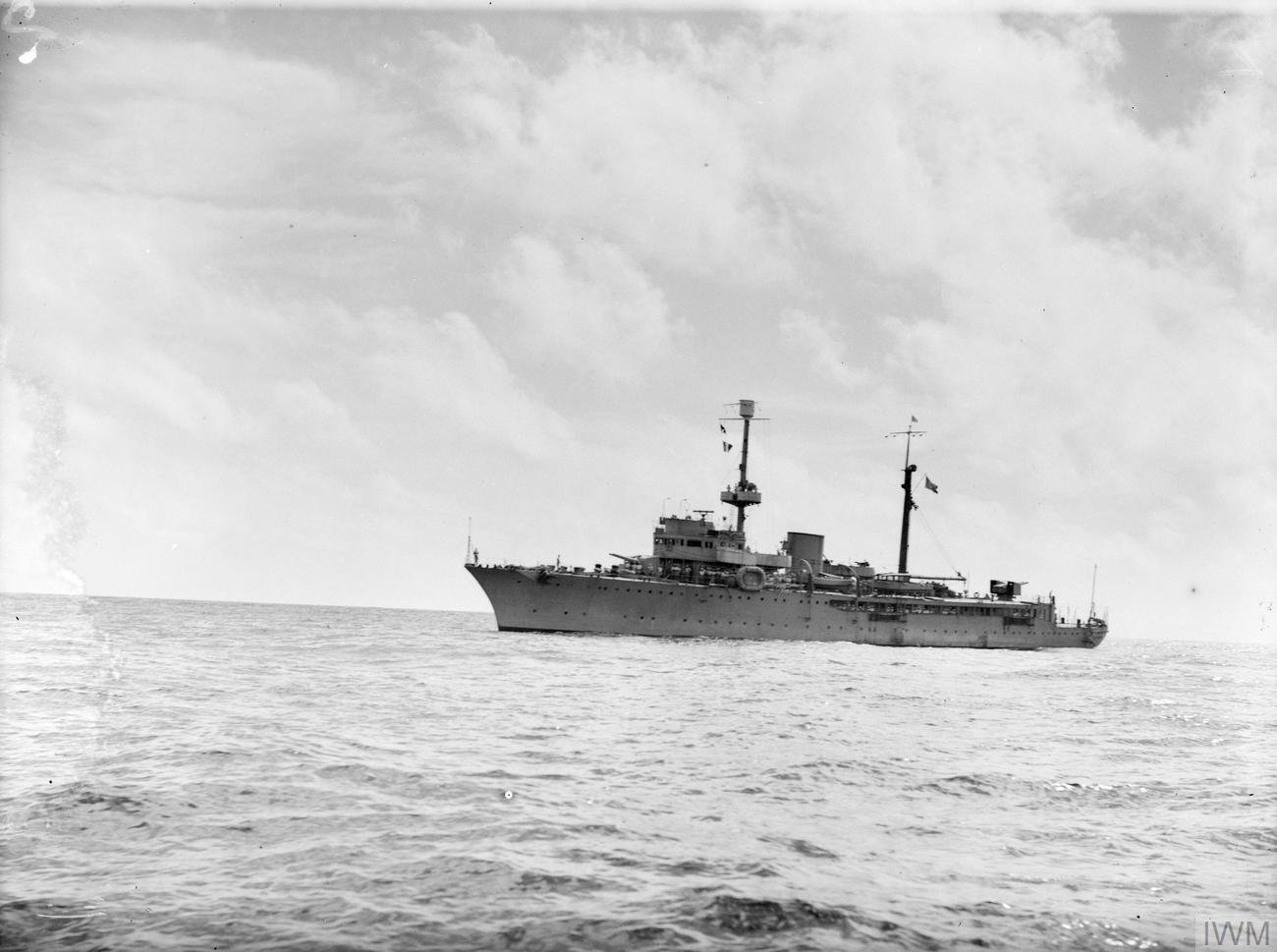
Eritrea, 14 September 1943 entering Port of Colombo to surrender.

Following Italy's declaration of war on 10 June 1940, colonial ship Eritrea became part of the Italian Royal Navy (Regia Marina). Eritrea was part of the Italian Navy's Red Sea Flotilla located at the port of Massawa in Eritrea.

In February 1941, as the East African Campaign started to go badly for the Italians, Massawa, the home port for Eritrea, became more endangered. Along with Ramb I and Ramb II, Eritrea slipped through a British blockade off Perim and sailed into the Indian Ocean on 20 February 1941.

She sailed across the Indian Ocean and ultimately reached Kobe, Japan. Upon reaching Japan, Eritrea was supposed to operate as a commerce raider in the Pacific Ocean. Even though allied with Italy, the authorities of then neutral Japan took a dim view of the idea of an Italian raider operating from neutral Japanese ports. The Japanese refused to comply with the Italian plans and Eritrea was not allowed to leave Kobe.

In December 1941, after the official declaration of war, the Japanese government allowed Eritrea to provide assistance to "transport submarines". These submarines, carrying rare goods, arrived in Japanese-held Penang and Singapore from the distant bases in German-held Bordeaux.

On 8 September 1943, when Italy declared an armistice, Eritrea was navigating between Singapore and Sabang to give a support to the Italian oceanic cargo submarine Comandante Cappellini. The submarine had just arrived from occupied France after a long and difficult voyage. As soon as the Reuters message about the surrender of Italy was picked up by the crew of Eritrea, the vessel changed course at once and headed at full speed to Colombo in Ceylon to surrender. Eritrea passed by Sumatra and escaped despite the presence of the Japanese aerial and naval units. Off the coast of Ceylon, it was intercepted by HMS Overdale Wyke of the Ceylon Naval Volunteer Force. Eritrea identified itself and its intent to surrender. It was boarded by a party from Overdale Wyke and escorted to the Port of Colombo. It was later used by the Royal Navy from Colombo and Addu Atoll.

=== French service ===
After the war, Eritrea was turned over to France. The French Navy used Eritrea in colonial service with the name Francis Garnier until 1965. Francis Garnier was then declassed to become a target ship. She was sunk during a nuclear test in the Pacific Ocean in 1966.

== See also ==
- East African Campaign
