= HMNZS Leander =

Leander-class cruiser

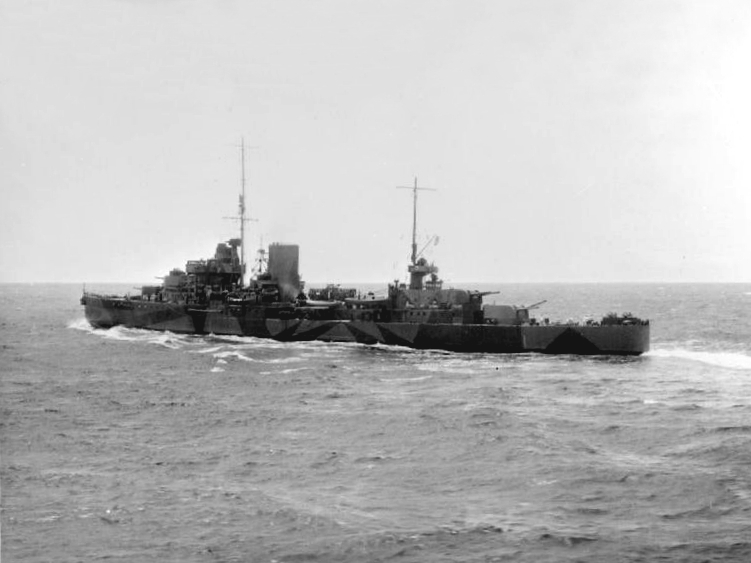

History

United Kingdom
- Name: HMS Leander
- Ordered: 18 February 1930
- Builder: HMNB Devonport
- Laid down: 8 September 1930
- Launched: 24 September 1931
- Commissioned: 24 March 1933
- Recommissioned: 27 August 1945
- Decommissioned: February 1948
- Out of service: loaned to Royal New Zealand Navy 30 April 1937
- Identification: Pennant number: 75
- Fate: Sold for scrapping 15 December 1949; Scrapped 15 January 1950

New Zealand
- Name: HMNZS Leander
- Commissioned: 30 April 1937
- Out of service: Repair and refit at Boston 8 May 1944
- Identification: Pennant number: 75
- Fate: Returned to Royal Navy 27 August 1945

General characteristics
- Class & type: Leander-class light cruiser
- Displacement: 7,270 tons standard; 9,740 tons full load
- Length: 554.9 ft (169.1 m)
- Beam: 56 ft (17 m)
- Draught: 19.1 ft (5.8 m)
- Installed power: 72,000 shaft horsepower (54,000 kW)
- Propulsion: Four Parsons geared steam turbines; Six boilers; Four shafts
- Speed: 32.5 knots (60 km/h)
- Range: 5,730 nmi (10,610 km; 6,590 mi) at 13 knots (24 km/h; 15 mph)
- Complement: 570 officers and enlisted
- Armament: 4 × twin BL 6 in (152 mm L/50) Mk.XXIII turrets; 4 × single QF 4 in (102 mm L/45) Mk.V guns; 3 × quad QF 0.5 in (12.7 mm) Mk.III Vickers; 2 × quadruple tubes for 21 in (533 mm) torpedoes Mk.IX
- Aircraft carried: 1 × catapult-launched aircraft; Original type was a Fairey Seafox; catapult and aircraft later replaced with Supermarine Walrus

HMNZS Leander was a light cruiser which served with the Royal New Zealand Navy during World War II. She was the lead ship of the Leander class. The ship initially served as HMS Leander in the Royal Navy before her transfer to New Zealand in 1937. In 1945, the ship was returned to the Royal Navy as HMS Leander and was involved in the Corfu Channel incident. The ship was scrapped in 1950.

== History ==
Leander was launched at Devonport on 24 September 1931. She was commissioned into the Royal Navy as HMS Leander on 24 March 1933. Along with Achilles she served in the New Zealand Division of the Royal Navy. In August 1937 Leander, on a journey from Europe to New Zealand, carried out an aerial survey of Henderson, Oeno and Ducie, and on each island a British flag was planted and an inscription was nailed up proclaiming: "This island belongs to H.B.M. King George VI."

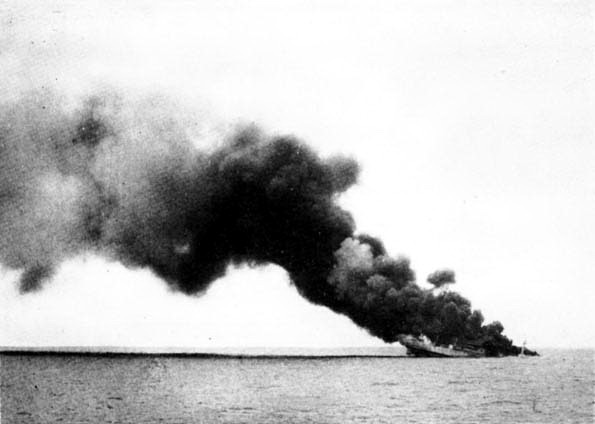
Italian ship Ramb I sinking after the engagement with Leander

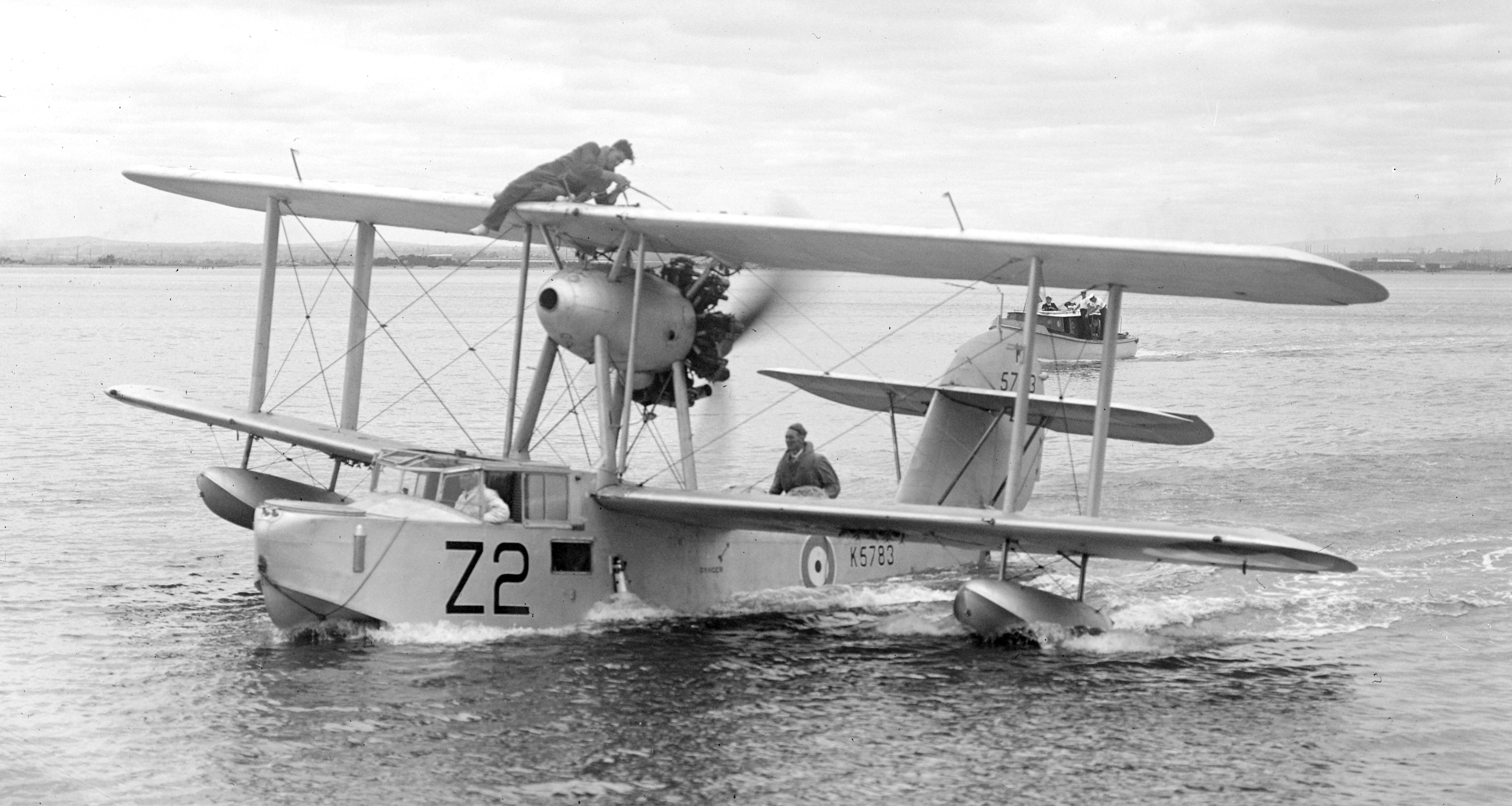
A catapult-launched Supermarine Walrus from Leander, ca. 1938, used as a fleet spotter

In World War II, Leander served initially in the Pacific and Indian Oceans. Commander Stephen Roskill, in later years the Royal Navy's Official Historian, was posted as the ship's executive officer in 1941. In the action on 27 February 1941, she sank the Italian armed merchantman Ramb I near the Maldives, rescuing 113 of her crew and taking slight damage. On 23 March 1941, Leander intercepted and captured the Vichy French merchant Charles L.D. in the Indian Ocean between Mauritius and Madagascar. On 14 April, Leander deployed for support of military operations in Persian Gulf and, on 18 April, joined the aircraft carrier Hermes and the light cruiser Emerald. On 22 April, Leander was released from support duties in the Persian Gulf and took part in search for the German raider Pinguin south of the Maldives.

In June 1941, Leander was transferred to the Mediterranean Fleet and was active against the Vichy French during the Syria-Lebanon Campaign. After serving in the Mediterranean, Leander returned to the Pacific Ocean in September 1941. In 1941 the New Zealand Division became the Royal New Zealand Navy (RNZN) and she was commissioned as HMNZS Leander in September 1941.

On 13 July 1943, Leander was with Rear Admiral Walden Lee Ainsworth's Task Group 36.1 of three light cruisers: Leander and the US ships Honolulu and St. Louis. The task group also included ten destroyers. At 01:00 the Allied ships established radar contact with the Japanese cruiser Jintsu, which was accompanied by five destroyers near Kolombangara in the Solomon Islands. In the ensuing Battle of Kolombangara, Jintsu was sunk and all three Allied cruisers were hit by torpedoes and disabled. Leander was hit by a single torpedo just abaft 'A' boiler room. 26 crew from the boiler room and the No.1 4-inch gun mount immediately above were killed or posted missing. The ship was so badly damaged that she took no further part in the war. She was first repaired in Auckland, then proceeded to a full refit in Boston.

She returned to the Royal Navy on 27 August 1945. In 1946 she was involved in the Corfu Channel Incident. She was scrapped in 1950.

== Legacy ==
The superyacht Leander G, owned by Sir Donald Gosling, is named after HMS Leander, the first naval vessel on which he served.

In 2020, Fiji commissioned RFNS Savenaca, a patrol vessel named after Savenaca Naulumatua, a sailor from Fiji who died while serving aboard Leander during the Battle of Kolombangara.

In 2024, Fiji commissioned RFNS Timo a patrol vessel named after Timo Puamau, another sailor from Fiji who also died while serving aboard Leander during the Battle of Kolombangara.

== See also ==
- Cruisers of the Royal New Zealand Navy
