= Italian auxiliary cruiser Ramb II =

1936 Italian banana boat

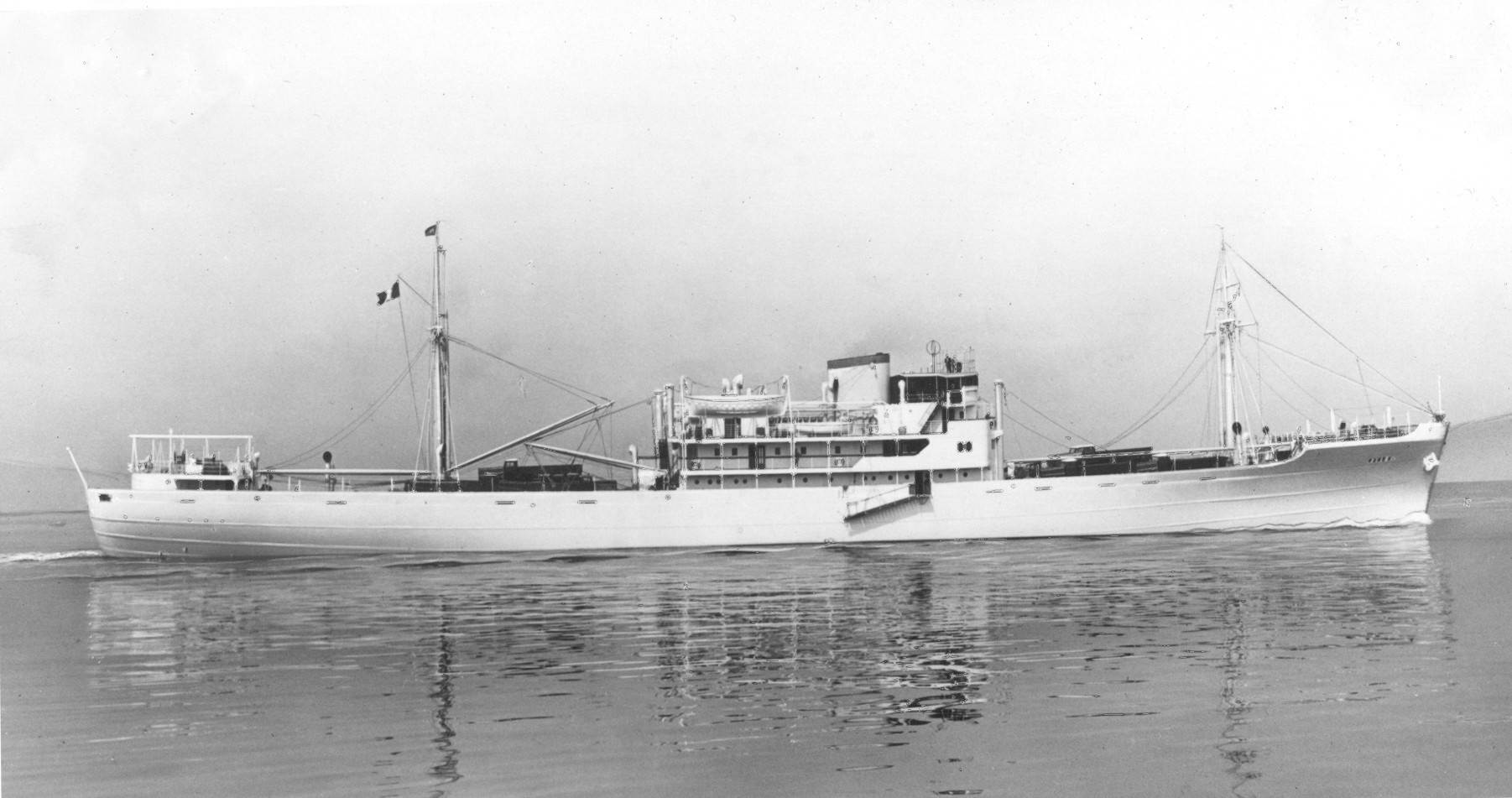
- RAMB II in Adriatic (August 1937).

History

Kingdom of Italy
- Name: Ramb II (1937-May 1941); Calitea II (May 1941-September 1943)
- Owner: Italian Government
- Operator: Regia Azienda Monopolio Banane
- Builder: C.R.D.A., Monfalcone
- Yard number: 1181
- Laid down: December 14, 1936
- Launched: June 7, 1937
- Commissioned: September 6, 1937
- Reclassified: Auxiliary cruiser, 1940
- Home port: Genoa
- Identification: Italy official number 2169; Call sign ICHN
- Fate: Scuttled by her crew in Kobe harbor, 8 September 1943 later refloated by Japanese, 1943

Empire of Japan
- Name: Ikutagawa Maru
- Acquired: 1943
- Commissioned: 30 November 1943
- In service: 3 October 1943
- Stricken: 5 February 1945
- Identification: Call sign JXBY
- Fate: Sunk, 12 January 1945

General characteristics
- Type: Refrigerated cargo ship; (June 1937 - April 1940); (December 1941 - January 1945); Auxiliary cruiser; (April 1940 - May 1941)
- Tonnage: 3,685 GRT; 2,190 NRT
- Length: 383 ft 2 in (116.79 m)
- Beam: 49 ft 9 in (15.16 m)
- Depth: 24 ft 8 in (7.52 m)
- Installed power: 1193 Nhp
- Propulsion: 2 × 7-cylinder CRDA marine Diesel engines; twin screws
- Speed: 18 knots (21 mph; 33 km/h)
- Capacity: 2,424 tons; 12 passengers
- Complement: 120
- Armament: 2 × 120 mm (4.7 in) guns; 2 × 13.2 mm (0.52 in) anti-aircraft guns

Service record
- Part of: Red Sea Flotilla

The Italian auxiliary cruiser Ramb II was a pre-war banana boat built at Monfalcone by the CRDA in 1937. She briefly served as an auxiliary cruiser with Regia Marina early in World War II before becoming an auxiliary transport with the Imperial Japanese Navy later in her career.

== Details and construction ==
In the second half of the 1930s, Ministry of the Colonies of the Kingdom of Italy placed an order for four ships to transport bananas from Mogadishu in Italian Somaliland to Naples. These ships had to have a large enough cargo capacity, and big endurance to be able to sail without any intermediate stops. These four refrigerating vessels were put under control of the Regia Azienda Monopolio Banane (RAMB) with headquarters in Rome. Two, including Ramb II were built by CRDA at Monfalcone, and two at the Ansaldo shipyards in Sestri Ponente. Ramb II was laid down on December 14, 1936, launched on June 7, 1937, and delivered to Regia Azienda Monopolio Banane (RAMB) on September 6, 1937.

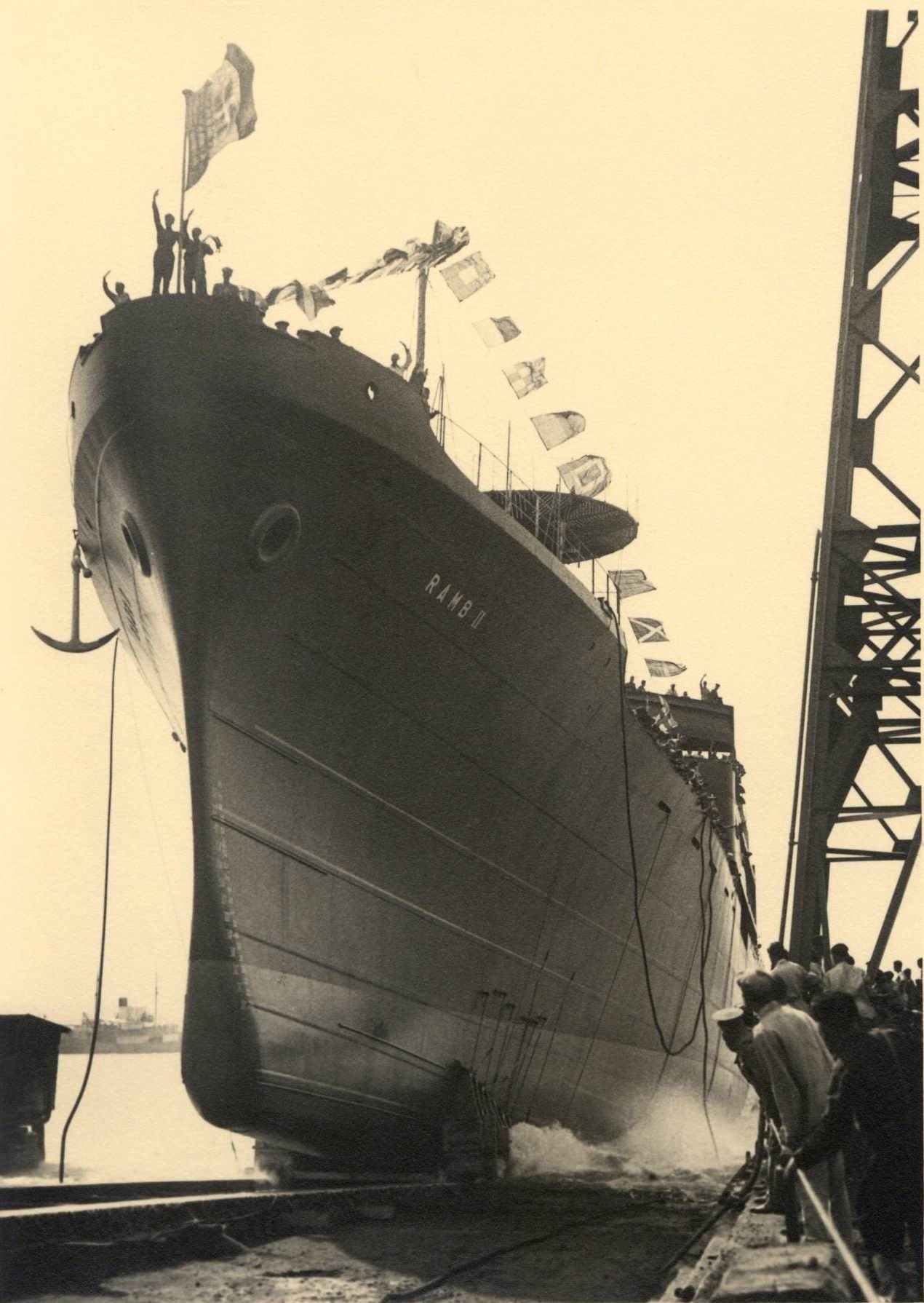
RAMB II being launched at Monfalcone (1937).

Medium-small but very modern vessels for the era, the four RAMBs could carry approximately 2,400 tons of cargo, as well as twelve passengers. Two passengers could be accommodated in a luxury apartment with a bedroom, living room and facilities, and ten in twin bedrooms. The ship had a private deck reserved for passengers (separate from the crew), a dining room with views, and two verandas for the smokers. Passenger accommodations were air-conditioned.

As built, the ship was 383 feet 2 inches (116.79 m) long (between perpendiculars) and 49 feet 9 inches (15.16 m) abeam, a mean draft of 24 feet 8 inches (7.52 m). RAMB II was assessed at 3,685 GRT and 2,190 NRT. The vessel had a steel hull, and was propelled by two 2-stroke single-cycle single-acting diesel engines, each one of seven cylinders of 22 1/16 inches (56.0 cm) diameter by 33 1/16 inches (84.0 cm) stroke, that drove two screw propellers and moved the ship at up to 18.0 knots (20.7 mph; 33.3 km/h).

According to legislative provision, these ships were constructed with the possibility of transforming them into auxiliary cruisers, so there was enough space left on deck to accommodate four 120 mm (4.7 in) cannons. Cannons and the matériel required for the military upgrade were stored in Massawa for two ships, and in Naples for the other two.

== Service ==
During the two years of peace Ramb II transported bananas from Italian Somaliland to Venice, Naples and Genoa, and carried various goods to Mogadishu on her return journeys. On August 7, 1938, while in Trieste, there was an explosion on board the ship, killing eight men.

On April 9, 1940, she was requisitioned by the Regia Marina and converted into an auxiliary cruiser. The refitting work took place at the Eritrean port of Massawa. After conversion, she was armed with two 120/40 cannons and two 13.2 mm Breda anti-aircraft guns. With Italy's entry into World War II on June 10, 1940, Ramb II became a part of the Italian Navy's Red Sea Flotilla.

During her short career as an auxiliary cruiser, Ramb II never ventured out and remained berthed in Massawa due to lack of allied merchant traffic and significant presence of Royal Navy in the Red Sea.

With the start of Operation Compass in North Africa and the defeat of the Italian troops at Sidi Barrani on 9–12 December 1940, it became clear that it would be impossible for Italian troops in Libya to reach Italian East Africa to break its isolation. The fuel supplies were dwindling and were projected to be exhausted by June 1941. In anticipation of the inevitable fall of the colony, a plan was developed to send as many ships as possible to Japan or occupied France and to destroy all other ships that could not make the journey. Colonial ship Eritrea, Ramb II and Ramb I were among the ships that were sent out to the Far East.

Ramb II left Massawa on 22 February 1941, after Ramb I and Eritrea which departed earlier, with both auxiliary cruisers heading to Nagasaki, and Eritrea to Kobe. After departing from Massawa, all three ships first passed by Perim evading the Royal Navy ships and Royal Air Force aircraft based at Aden and Socotra, then the Bab el-Mandeb Strait and the Gulf of Aden and entered the Indian Ocean. On 27 February 1941 Ramb I was intercepted and sunk by cruiser HMNZS Leander, but the other two vessels sailed across the Indian Ocean and the Sunda Sea and safely arrived in Japan.

Ramb II reached Kobe on 23 March 1941. The Italian government wanted to use the ship as a commerce raider against British merchant traffic in the Indian Ocean, however, since Japan was still neutral, the Japanese government was opposed to the idea of an Italian raider operating from the Japanese ports. The next day the vessel departed Kobe and dismounted her armament in international waters, and then returned to Japan. Her name was changed to Calitea II in May 1941 and the ship was transferred to the Triestine Line. Ramb II then sailed to Tianjin, where she like other Italian merchant vessels was visited by Admiral Carlo Balsamo, a naval attache in Tokyo, who was inspecting ships available to carry natural rubber from the Far East to occupied France. Calitea II was not selected for the task due to her limited available cargo space for such a long journey. In December 1941 Calitea II was chartered by the Japanese government as a cargo vessel, while retaining her Italian crew.

She was officially chartered into the Imperial Japanese Navy as a stores ship in September 1942 and underwent additional refrigeration construction at Kawasaki Heavy Industries, Ltd. shipyard. Calitea II departed for her first trip on November 30, 1942, from Kobe to Southeast Asia, arriving in Surabaya on December 23. The vessel was engaged in inter-island service throughout 1943, carrying supplies and troops when necessary. The ship returned to Kobe for repairs on August 24, 1943. After Italy signed Armistice of Cassibile on September 8, 1943, her Italian crew scuttled the ship at Kobe to prevent the vessel from falling into Japanese hands.

=== In Japanese service ===
Calitea II was refloated by the Japanese, and on October 3, 1943 renamed Ikutagawa Maru and assigned call sign JXBY. On November 30, 1943, she was officially registered as an auxiliary transport ship. After completing her repairs in December, she proceeded to Sasebo, where she became part of the Southwest Area Fleet.

Ikutagawa Maru departed Moji for her first mission under the Japanese flag on January 7, 1944, as part of convoy No. 127 consisting of seven other merchant vessels, and destroyer Karukaya and minesweeper W-27 serving as escorts. On January 10, 1944, US submarine Seawolf sighted and attacked the convoy in the approximate position 27°32′N 127°25′E sinking three vessels.

Throughout 1944 the ship continued carrying supplies throughout the island ports of South East Asia, such as Makassar, Surabaya, Ambon and others. On November 4, 1944, she ran aground just off Cape Agal but managed to refloat herself a few hours later and arrive safely at Banggi Island. On January 5, 1945, Ikutagawa Maru departed Manila escorted by destroyers Momi and Hinoki. Next day, the convoy was attacked by the US destroyer Bennion, who damaged Hinoki, temporarily disabling her, and forcing both Japanese destroyers to retreat to Manila, while Ikutagawa Maru continued on to Cap Saint-Jacques.

On January 12, 1945, as part of Operation Gratitude designed to support the liberation of Luzon in the Philippines, US Navy airplanes of Task Force 38 launched massive air strikes on ports, airfields and other military installations of Indochina, mainly located in and around Saigon. During the attack, Ikutagawa Maru along with several other vessels was sunk in the approximate position 10°20′N 107°50′E.

== Bibliography ==
- Alton, Dave (2006). "Question 15/03: Italian Warship Losses". Warship International. XLIII (1): 32–33. ISSN 0043-0374.
- Dupuis, Dobrillo (2014). Forzate il blocco. 1940. L'odissea della marina militare italiana. Res Gestae. ISBN 978-8866970606.
