= Italian auxiliary cruiser Ramb I =

World War II auxiliary cruiser

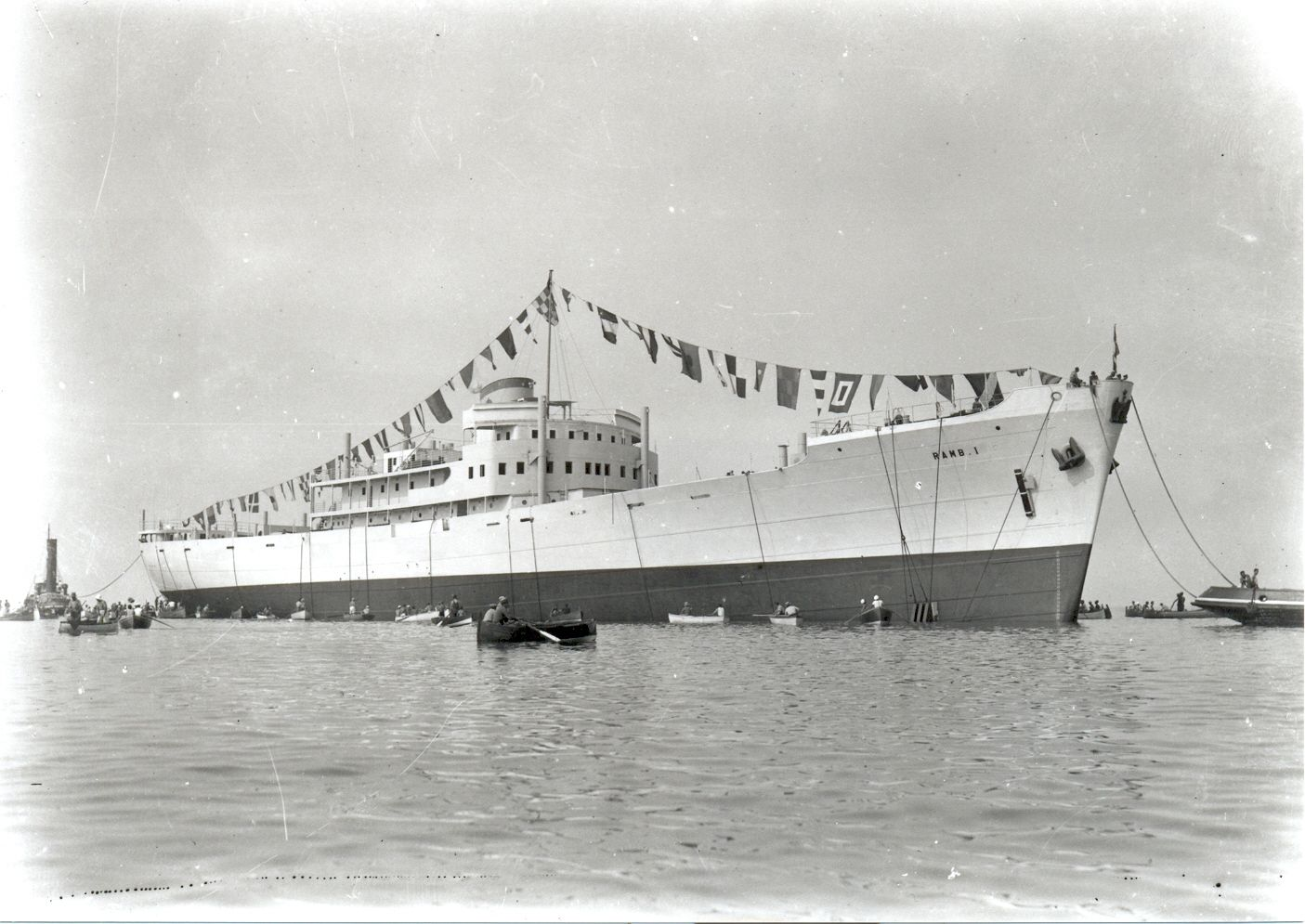
- RAMB I

History

Kingdom of Italy
- Name: Ramb I
- Port of registry: Genoa
- Builder: Ansaldo, Genoa
- Yard number: 308
- Laid down: October 29, 1936
- Launched: July 22, 1937
- Commissioned: December 6, 1937 (as a merchant)
- Reclassified: Auxiliary cruiser, June 9, 1940
- Identification: Italy official number 2176; Call sign ICHM
- Fate: Sunk by HMNZS Leander, 27 February 1941

General characteristics
- Type: Refrigerated cargo ship (1937–1940); Auxiliary cruiser (1940–1941)
- Tonnage: 3,667 GRT; 2,179 NRT
- Length: 383 ft 2 in (116.79 m)
- Beam: 49 ft 7 in (15.11 m)
- Depth: 24 ft 8 in (7.52 m)
- Installed power: 1525 nhp
- Propulsion: 2 × 9-cylinder FIAT marine Diesel engines; twin screws
- Speed: 18.5 knots (34.3 km/h; 21.3 mph) (maximum); 17.0 knots (31.5 km/h; 19.6 mph) (cruising)
- Capacity: 2,418 GRT; 12 passengers
- Complement: 120
- Armament: 4 × 120 mm (4.7 in) guns; 2(or 4) × 13.2 mm (0.52 in) anti-aircraft guns

Service record
- Part of: Red Sea Flotilla
- Commanders: Alfredo Bonezzi

The Italian ship Ramb I was a pre-war "banana boat" converted to an auxiliary cruiser in World War II. Ramb I operated as an armed merchant in the Red Sea and was ordered to sail to Japan after the fall of Massawa to the Allies. She was sunk in the Indian Ocean before she could reach her intended destination.

== Details and construction ==
In the second half of the 1930s Ministry of the Colonies of the Kingdom of Italy placed an order for four ships to transport bananas from Mogadishu in Italian Somaliland to Naples. These ships had to have a large enough cargo capacity, and big endurance to be able to sail without any intermediate stops. These four refrigerating vessels were put under control of the Regia Azienda Monopolio delle Banane (RAMB) with headquarters in Rome. Two were built by CRDA at Monfalcone, and two, including Ramb I, at the Ansaldo shipyards in Sestri Ponente. Ramb I was built between October 1936 and December 1937 (hull number 308).

Medium-small but very modern vessels for the era, the four RAMBs could carry approximately 2,400 tons of cargo, as well as 12 passengers. Two passengers could be accommodated in a luxury apartment with a bedroom, living room and facilities, and 10 in twin bedrooms. The ship had a private deck reserved for passengers (separate from the crew), a dining room with views, and two verandas for the smokers. Passenger accommodations were air-conditioned.

Ramb I could reach a speed of 18.50 knots, its cruising speed was 17 knots, and its displacement was 3,667 tons. The propulsion machinery consisted of two two-stroke FIAT diesel engines with nine cylinders.

According to legislative provision, these ships were constructed with the possibility of transforming them into auxiliary cruisers, so there was enough space left on deck to accommodate four 120mm cannons. Cannons and the matériel required for the military upgrade were stored in Massawa for two ships, and in Naples for the other two.

In the two years of peace, Ramb I took bananas from Italian Somaliland to Venice, Naples and Genoa, and carried various goods to Mogadishu on her return journeys.

== Operational history ==
On June 9, 1940, Ramb I was requisitioned in Massawa by the Regia Marina and was made a part of Red Sea Flotilla. At the time of Italy's entry into World War II, only one of four vessels was located in the Mediterranean (Ramb III), while the other three were in the Red Sea without any possibility of returning to Italy. Ramb I was upgraded in Massawa with four 120/40 cannons and two (or four) 13.2 mm Breda anti-aircraft guns.

During military operations in Eastern Africa Ramb I was not very active. All her activity amounted to a single and unsuccessful raid in the Red Sea on an enemy merchant in August 1940. Apart from some short patrols along the Eritrea coast, the ship was mainly used for Massawa's anti-aircraft defense against air bombardments.

With the start of Operation Compass in North Africa and the defeat of the Italian troops at Sidi Barrani on 9–12 December 1940, it became clear that it would be impossible for Italian troops in Libya to reach Italian East Africa to break its isolation. The fuel supplies were dwindling and were projected to be exhausted by June 1941. In anticipation of the inevitable fall of the colony, a plan was developed to send as many ships as possible to Japan or occupied France and to destroy all other ships that could not make the journey. Colonial ship Eritrea, Ramb I and Ramb II were among the ships that were sent out to the Far East.

Ramb I, Ramb II and Eritrea left Massawa around February 20, 1941, with both auxiliary cruisers heading to Nagasaki, and Eritrea to Kobe. After departing from Massawa, all three ships first passed by Perim evading the Royal Navy ships and Royal Air Force aircraft based at Aden and Socotra, then the Bab el-Mandeb Strait and the Gulf of Aden and entered the Indian Ocean.

=== Sinking ===
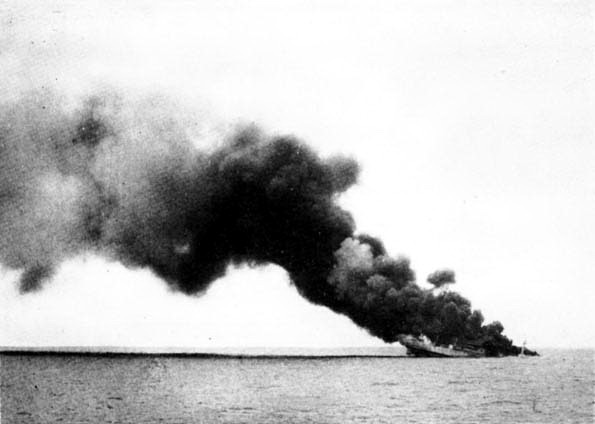
Italian ship Ramb I sinking in 1941

Royal New Zealand Navy light cruiser HMNZS Leander, which had just escorted convoy US-9 to Bombay, was sailing in the northern Arabian Sea searching for the German cruiser Admiral Scheer believed to be in the area, as well as German raider ships disguised as merchants. After receiving news of the fall of Mogadishu on February 25, 1941 captain of the cruiser, Robert Hesketh Bevan, RN, changed the course north around 7:00 when Leander was 28 miles north of the equator and 320 miles west of the Maldive Islands. He believed that some Italian ships fleeing from Italian Somaliland and heading to the Far East could travel through this area. At 5:10 (Italian time) on February 27, 1941, Ramb I navigating in the northern Arabian Sea was sighted by Leander. The cruiser closed to less than 6 miles and signaled Ramb I with a projector to stop the engines and provide their documents (the Italian ship flew the British flag at the time).

Ramb I replied with false information, and Leander demanded the secret war code. Not being able to answer this question, Captain Bonezzi came to the conclusion that there was no alternative to fighting. The British flag was lowered and the Italian Tricolor was hoisted, and Ramb I opened fire from 3,000 yards (2,700 m) against the enemy cruiser, commencing a fight that lasted twenty minutes. Leander was hit once, and replied with five salvos within the next minute, leaving Ramb I seriously damaged and on fire. She lowered her flag and Leander stopped firing. Leander came closer, and Captain Bonezzi gave an order to abandon and scuttle the ship. Leander rescued Ramb I's captain and 112 men, of whom one later died from burns. The scuttling charges detonated shortly thereafter, causing Ramb I to sink in the position 01°00′N 68°30′E. Leander disembarked the survivors at Addu Atoll, and the tanker Pearleaf subsequently transported the survivors to prisoner of war camps in Colombo, Ceylon.

== See also ==
- Ramb II
- Ramb III
- Ramb IV

== Bibliography ==
- Alton, Dave (2006). "Question 15/03: Italian Warship Losses". Warship International. XLIII (1): 32–33. ISSN 0043-0374.
- Dupuis, Dobrillo (2014). Forzate il blocco. 1940. L'odissea della marina militare italiana. Res Gestae. ISBN 978-8866970606.
- Kelly, Christopher; Laycock, Stuart (2015). Italy Invades. Book Publishers Network. ISBN 978-0-9968825-0-7.
- Miller, Nathan (1995). War at Sea: A Naval History of World War II. New York, Oxford: Oxford University Press. ISBN 0-19-511038-2.
- Waters, SD (2008). HMNZS Leander. Lulu.com. ISBN 978-1435758926.
