= Günter Hessler =

German World War II U-boat commander (1909–1968)

- Born: 14 June 1909; Beerfelde, Märkisch-Oderland, German Empire
- Died: 4 April 1968 (aged 58); Bochum, West Germany
- Relatives: Karl Dönitz (father-in-law)
- Military career
- Allegiance: Weimar Republic (to 1933); Nazi Germany
- Branch: Reichsmarine; Kriegsmarine
- Service years: 1927–45
- Rank: Fregattenkapitän
- Commands: Torpedo boat Falke; U-107
- Conflicts: World War II: Battle of the Atlantic
- Awards: Knight's Cross of the Iron Cross

Günter Hessler (14 June 1909 – 4 April 1968) was a German Kriegsmarine officer during World War II. He commanded the Type IXB U-boat U-107, sinking 21 ships on three patrols, totalling 118,822 GRT of Allied shipping. Hessler was a recipient of the Knight's Cross of the Iron Cross and was commissioned after the war to write an account of the U-boat war by the British Ministry of Defence.

== Military career ==
Günter Hessler joined the Reichsmarine of the Weimar Republic on 5 April 1927 as a member of "Crew 1927" (the incoming class of 1927). He underwent basic military training in the 8th Company, 2nd Department of the standing ship division of the Baltic Sea in Stralsund (5 April 1927 – 3 July 1927). Hessler was then transferred to the training ship SSS Niobe (4 July 1927 – 31 October 1927), attaining the rank of Seekadett (midshipman) on 1 October 1927. After more than 16 months aboard the light cruiser Berlin (1 November 1927 – 17 March 1929), he underwent officer cadet training at the Naval Academy at Mürwik, which included navigational training cruises on the tender Frauenlob and the survey vessel Meteor. Hessler then advanced in rank to Fähnrich zur See (officer cadet) on 1 April 1929.

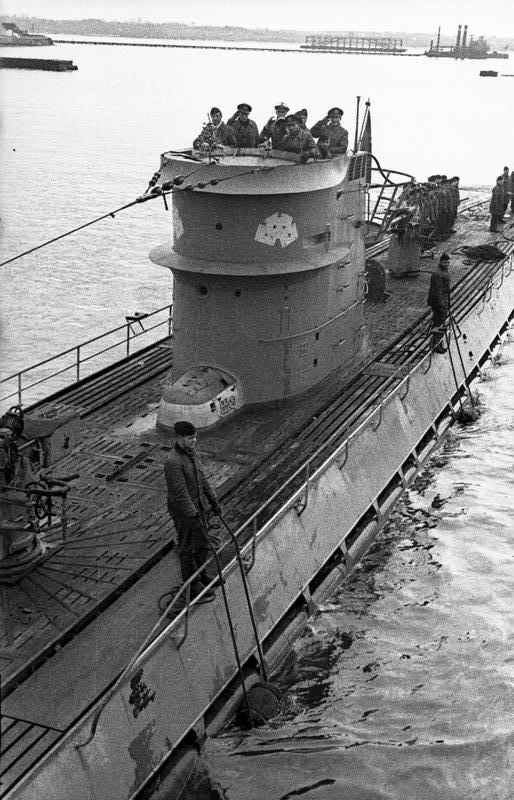
U-107 returning from war patrol November 1941

On 2 October 1936, he was appointed watch officer on the Aviso Grille, Adolf Hitler's state yacht, and on 30 March 1938, transferred to the battleship Gneisenau. In 1937, he married Karl Dönitz's daughter, Ursula. The marriage produced two sons, Peter and Klaus, and a daughter, Ute. Hessler took command of torpedo boat Falke on 27 March 1938. He remained in this position until 8 January 1940, earning the Iron Cross 2nd Class on 18 November 1939. Falke was assigned to the 5th Torpedo-boat Flotilla on 4 April 1939. On the outbreak of World War II, Falke was tasked with laying defensive naval mines and escort and security duties in the North Sea. In April 1940, Hessler transferred to the U-boat arm, and six months later, he was commissioned the U-107, unusually, without having served as either as erste Wachoffizier (first watch officer) or a Kommandantenschüler (commander-in-training).

On his first patrol (24 January 1941 – 1 March 1941), Hessler's boat sank four ships with a total of 18,514 GRT, but he became famous on his second patrol (29 March 1941 – 2 July 1941) — the most successful patrol of the entire war — sinking 14 ships with a total of 86,699 GRT. Oberleutnant zur See Helmut Witte was his first watch officer on these two patrols.

His third patrol (6 September 1941 – 11 November 1941) accounted for another three ships, totalling 13,641 tons, giving Hessler a career tally of 21 ships totalling 118,822 GRT, including two Royal Navy ocean boarding vessels, HMS Crispin and Manistee. Hessler then handed over command of U-107 to Harald Gelhaus and transferred to the Befehlshaber der U-Boote (BdU). He served on the naval staff as erste Admiralstabsoffizier (first officer of the admiralty staff) from 24 November 1941 until the end of the war in Europe on 8 May 1945.

== After the war ==
After the war, Hessler spent over a year in Allied captivity and testified at the Nuremberg Trials on behalf of the Ubootwaffe and his father-in-law, Großadmiral Karl Dönitz. In 1947, Hessler was commissioned to write The U-Boat War in the Atlantic, an account of the German U-boat offensive, by the British Royal Navy. Assisted by Alfred Hoschatt, the former commander of U-378 and also a staff officer of the BdU, he completed the three-volume work in 1951. Hessler died in 1968 aged 58.

== Awards ==
- Iron Cross (1939)
  - 2nd Class (18 November 1939)
  - 1st Class (1 March 1941)
- U-boat War Badge (1939) (3 July 1941)
- Knight's Cross of the Iron Cross on 24 June 1941 as Kapitänleutnant and commander of U-107
- German Cross in Gold on 9 November 1944 as Korvettenkapitän with the Befehlshaber der Unterseeboote

== Works ==
- Great Britain Ministry of Defence (Navy) and Hessler, Günter (1989). U Boat War in the Atlantic 1939–1945: German Naval History. Stationery Office. ISBN 978-0117726031.
