= SS Wahehe =

Wahehe was the name of two ships operated by Woermann-Linie AG, Hamburg.

- SS Wahehe (1914), built as Hilda Woermann in 1914, renamed Wahehe in 1917. Surrendered as war reparation in 1919, to Burns, Philp & Co and renamed Marella Sold in 1948 to Compagnia de Navigatione Baru, Panama and renamed Captain Marcos.
- SS Wahehe (1922), built in 1922 as Wadigo, completed as Wahehe. Captured by Royal Navy in 1940, renamed Empire Citizen, torpedoed and sunk by U-107 in February 1941.
