= HMS Kimberley =

Destroyer of the Royal Navy

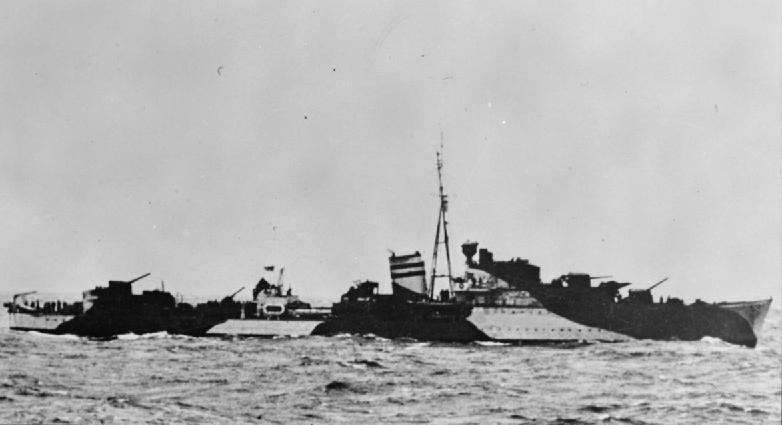

History

United Kingdom
- Name: HMS Kimberley
- Builder: John I. Thornycroft & Company, Woolston, Hampshire
- Laid down: 17 January 1938
- Launched: 1 June 1939
- Commissioned: 21 December 1939
- Motto: Post tenbras lux : 'After darkness light'
- Fate: Sold for scrap, 30 March 1949
- Notes: Badge: On a Field barry wavy of six White and Blue a diamond with rays White, charges with a lion rampant Black

General characteristics (as built)
- Class & type: K-class destroyer
- Displacement: 1,690 long tons (1,720 t) (standard); 2,330 long tons (2,370 t) (deep load)
- Length: 356 ft 6 in (108.66 m) o/a
- Beam: 35 ft 9 in (10.90 m)
- Draught: 12 ft 6 in (3.81 m) (deep)
- Installed power: 44,000 shp (33,000 kW); 2 × Admiralty 3-drum boilers
- Propulsion: 2 × shafts; 2 × geared steam turbines
- Speed: 36 knots (67 km/h; 41 mph)
- Range: 5,500 nmi (10,200 km; 6,300 mi) at 15 knots (28 km/h; 17 mph)
- Complement: 183 (218 for flotilla leaders)
- Sensors & processing systems: ASDIC
- Armament: 3 × twin 4.7 in (120 mm) guns; 1 × quadruple 2 pdr (40 mm (1.6 in) AA guns; 2 × quadruple 0.5 in (12.7 mm) anti-aircraft machineguns; 2 × quintuple 21 in (533 mm) torpedo tubes; 1 × rack, 2 × throwers for depth charges

HMS Kimberley was a K-class destroyer of the Royal Navy. She served in the Second World War and survived it, being one of only two of the K-class to do so. So far she has been the only ship of the Royal Navy to bear the name Kimberley, after the town of Kimberley, Northern Cape, site of the Siege of Kimberley in the Second Boer War. She was adopted by the civil community of Eastwood, Kimberley and Selston, Nottinghamshire in 1942 after a successful Warship Week campaign for National Savings.

== Construction and commissioning ==
Kimberley was ordered from the yards of John I. Thornycroft & Company, Woolston, Hampshire under the 1937 Programme. She was laid down on 17 January 1938 as Yard No 1179. She was launched on 1 June 1939 and commissioned on 21 December, though final works were not completed until early the following year.

== Career ==
=== Norway and the North Sea ===
Kimberley spent January 1940 carrying out contractors' trials. She finished the trials and had completed storing and weapon system calibrations by February, and took passage to Scapa Flow to join the units of the Home Fleet. On 21 February she was deployed with the cruiser HMS Manchester in the North Western Approaches, carrying out patrols to intercept merchant shipping returning to Germany and commerce raiders attempting to attack Atlantic convoys. During this patrol, the two ships captured the German freighter Wahehe. Kimberley provided a boarding party and the ship was taken into Kirkwall as a prize.

She remained with the Home Fleet carrying out patrol duties throughout March. On 7 April she formed part of a screen for the battleships HMS Rodney and HMS Valiant, the battlecruiser HMS Repulse and the cruisers of the Home Fleet during a search in the North Western Approaches for German ships that had been reported on passage into the Atlantic. Actually, these ships were part of Operation Weserübung, the German invasion of Norway. On 8 April, after the invasion, Kimberley remained as part of the screen for allied ships preparing to land in Norway as part of Operation Wilfred. She was detached with HMS Bedouin, HMS Eskimo and HMS Punjabi later in the day to go to the assistance of HMS Glowworm, which was under attack by the German cruiser Admiral Hipper. Before the British destroyers could come to the relief, the Glowworm was sunk with heavy loss of life.

Kimberley was dispatched with HMS Eskimo and HMS Penelope on 11 April to attack German transports that had been reported at Bodø. Penelope ran aground whilst attempting to enter the fjord at Fleinvær, and had to be towed clear by Eskimo. They then successfully entered the fjord but did not find any ships. They returned to support fleet operations off Narvik. Kimberley then took part in the Second Battle of Narvik, during which she attempted to tow HMS Cossack to safety, after Cossack had been damaged by German destroyers and disabled. The attempt failed, but Cossack was later towed clear by HMS Forester. Kimberley was left on patrol at Narvik. Several crew members were killed when a boarding party was sent into Narvik to disable a German seaplane. Kimberley then returned to Scapa Flow.

=== Arrival in the Mediterranean ===
She was nominated to serve in the Mediterranean in May, and underwent preparation for foreign service that saw the damage sustained during the Norwegian operations being repaired. Her pennant number was also changed, to G50. She left Britain on 16 May, in company with her sisters, HMS Kandahar and HMS Khartoum. They arrived at Alexandria on 23 April, and all three were nominated for service in the Red Sea, in company with another sister, HMS Kingston. These actions were part of a series of precautions that were being taken in anticipation of Italy's entry to the war on the side of the Axis powers. Italy had a number of destroyers and submarines based in Eritrea, which could threaten British shipping.

Kimberley and her sisters were deployed on convoy defence duties throughout June and July, but in August Kimberley was nominated to support the evacuation of British nationals from Berbera, in British Somaliland. She and HMS Khandahar joined the a taskforce consisting of the cruisers HMS Caledon, HMAS Hobart, HMS Ceres and HMS Carlisle, the sloops HMAS Parramatta, HMS Shoreham and HMS Auckland, the armed boarding vessels Chakala, Chakdina and Laomedon, and the hospital ship Vita. On 16 August they assisted in the evacuation of over 7,000 people from British Somalia, embarking them for passage to Aden.

=== Convoys through the Red Sea ===
On 12 September Kimberley joined the military convoy WS-2A as it passed through the Red Sea as an escort, in company with HMS Shropshire, HMS Auckland and HMS Flamingo. She was detached on 14 September. On 20 October she joined HMS Leander and five sloops of the East Indies Squadron in escorting Convoy BN 7. They came under attack the following day by four Italian destroyers some 150 miles east of Massawa. Kimberley engaged the Sauro-class destroyer Francesco Nullo and drove her ashore on Harmil Island. Kimberley then fired a torpedo at the enemy, but came under fire from shore batteries. She took a hit in her engine room, which disabled her. She was taken in tow by HMS Leander and brought into Port Sudan. Nullo was destroyed the following day by RAF Blenheim bombers. Kimberley was under repair on 27 October, but was back in action on 31 October, when she resumed convoy defence duties. The damage meant that she was operating at reduced speed.

Kimberley and HMS Caledon escorted the troopships SS Duchess of York and SS Georgic from Aden to the military convoy WS-3 in the Red Sea on 12 November. She was detached on 14 November and returned to Aden. She continued to escort military convoys throughout December, this time in company with HMS Carlisle and HMS Kandahar. Kimberley took passage to Bombay in January 1941 to complete repairs, which lasted throughout February. She rejoined the Mediterranean Fleet at Alexandria in March and began deployments with them in April. On 16 April she was part of the screen for the aircraft carrier HMS Formidable, together with the destroyers HMS Griffin, HMS Defender and HMS Kingston during her passage to Suda Bay with other fleet units prior to the planned bombardment of Tripoli. Kimberley remained offshore with Formidable during the bombardment on 21 April. The following day she deployed with the fleet screen during the return to Alexandria after the end of the bombardment, arriving on 23 April.

=== Covering the Mediterranean convoys ===
She was quickly deployed again on 26 April, as an escort for Convoy AG-15 to Piraeus, along with HMAS Vampire and HMS Auckland. She was then engaged in the evacuation of allied troops from Greece, taking troops off from Raphti on 27 April, and Kalamata on 29 April. She left Kalmata for the final time on 1 May. Kimberley deployed again on 6 May, with HMS Griffin, HMS Havock, HMS Hereward, HMS Hero, HMS Hotspur, HMS Jervis, HMS Juno, HMS Kandahar, HMS Kingston HMS Nizam and HMS Nubian, as a screen for HMS Formidable, the battleships HMS Barham, HMS Valiant and HMS Warspite, the cruisers HMS Orion, HMAS Perth and HMS Abdiel as they provided cover for convoys in the eastern Mediterranean. These convoys were a convoy from Egypt to Malta, and a military convoy from Malta to Alexandria with tanks for the Eighth Army. Kimberley remained deployed with the fleet screen until it arrived at Alexandria on 10 May, having been the target of unsuccessful air attacks.

She deployed again on 15 May screening fleet units covering convoys to reinforce Crete. She deployed with HMS Janus, HMS Hasty and HMS Hereward as a screen for the cruisers HMS Dido, HMS Orion and HMS Ajax. They formed Force D, and on 22 May they intercepted an invasion convoy north of Crete and sank several ships. They took part in the bombardment of the airfield at Scarpanto on 23 May and the following day were deployed with HMS Decoy, HMS Hotspur, HMS Hereward, HMS Imperial and HMS Jackal as a screen for Dido and Ajax as they searched Kaso Strait for invasion craft. Kimberley returned to Alexandria on 25 May, sailing again on 28 May with Ajax, Orion and Dido, screened by Hotspur, Hereward, Imperial and Jackal to begin evacuating troops from Crete. The destroyers reached Heraklion on 29 May and began to ferry troops to the cruisers offshore. The British ships came under heavy and sustained air attacks during their return passage, during which both Ajax and Dido were badly damaged.

=== Evacuating Crete ===
Kimberley returned to Crete on 31 May and began evacuating troops from Sphakia on 1 June. She returned to Alexandria on 2 June, and on 6 June was nominated to support military operations in Syria, with HMS Kandahar, Jackal, Janus and the cruiser HMS Phoebe. They deployed off Syria on 7 June to intercept Vichy French destroyers that were attempting to provide support to defending French military units. The British ships also provided naval gunfire support. Kimberley took HMS Janus in tow on 9 June after Janus had been disabled in an engagement with several French destroyers. She towed Janus to Haifa, coming under attack from Vichy French aircraft as they made the passage. Kimberley returned to action on 10 June, when she carried out a bombardment of the Khan bridge area in support of a British military advance. On 15 June whilst off Beirut, she was involved in an engagement with the French Guépard class destroyers Guepard and Valmy. Kimberley remained off the Syrian coast into July, carrying further support bombardments on 4 July, before returning to Alexandria.

=== Convoys to Malta ===
On 22 July she and the destroyers HMS Hasty, Havock, Jackal, Jaguar, Jervis, Kandahar, Kingston, Nizam and Nubian formed a screen for the battleships HMS Queen Elizabeth and Valiant, the cruisers HMS Ajax, HMAS Hobart, HMS Leander, Naiad, Neptune, Phoebe and Abdiel as they carried out a diversionary operation in the eastern Mediterranean to divert attention away from Operation Substance, a Malta relief convoy. Kimberley was deployed in support of army operations against Tobruk, and screening fleet units as they searched for enemy supply convoys throughout August to October 1941.

She was transferred in November to join the cruisers HMS Aurora and HMS Penelope as part of Force K. These ships were based at Malta, and were tasked with the job of intercepting enemy supply convoys bound for North Africa. Kimberley took passage to Malta on 22 November with HMS Ajax, Neptune and Kingston to reinforce Force K. They were screened by the cruisers HMS Euryalus, HMS Naiad and two destroyers as they made this transit. Kimberley had her first deployment with the Force on 30 November, when she joined HMS Aurora, Penelope, Ajax, Neptune and Kingston in intercepting a supply convoy. Kimberley carried out an attack on the convoy off Benghazi, on 1 December and succeeded in sinking the ammunition ship Adriatico. She was in action again the following day, when she took part in the sinking of the Italian destroyer Alvise Da Mosto and the merchant Mantovani off Kerkenah Bank.

She next sailed from Malta on 5 December, with HMS Kingston and Lively, and the cruisers Ajax and Neptune. They formed the escort for the fast supply ship HMS Breconshire, during her passage to meet the ships out of Alexandria. Ajax, Neptune and Lively were detached on 6 December and returned to Malta. Kimberley remained with the Breconshire. They were joined on 7 December by HMAS Hobart, but she was soon detached to go to the assistance of HMS Flamingo, which had been damaged off Tobruk. Kimberley and Kingston arrived at Alexandria with the Breconshire on 8 December. On 15 December Kimberley joined the cruisers HMS Carlisle, Euryalus and Naiad and the destroyers Hasty, Havock, Jervis, Kingston, Kipling, Decoy and Nizam in forming Force C, which was assigned to escort the Breconshire to Malta. By 16 December unconfirmed reports of Italian battle group escorting a supply convoy to Benghazi had reached the British force. The force was sighted on 17 December, and the Breconshire was detached from Force C, escorted by Decoy and Havock. Kimberley remained with Force C. A brief engagement followed, later becoming known as the First Battle of Sirte, in which the Italian warships withdrew after the British destroyers attempted to approach to make torpedo attacks. Kimberley returned to Alexandria on 18 December with the rest of the escorts.

=== Torpedoing ===
1942 saw her deployed in support of the Tobruk garrison, as well as continued to provide escort and defence for convoys. On 12 January, whilst off Tobruk she was struck by a torpedo fired by U-77. Kimberley sustained major damage to her stern, and had to be taken in tow by HMS Heythrop and was towed to Alexandria. She spent February to December 1942, and all of 1943 under repair, first at Alexandria, then at Bombay. After trials and work-up between January and March 1944, she was finally ready to return to service. She returned to the Mediterranean in April and was put back on her usual patrol duties. She was patrolling on 27 May with HMS Aurora, when she and the Free French destroyers Le Malin, Le Terrible and Le Fantasque were damaged in heavy weather and forced to return to Alexandria for repairs. The repairs were completed by June and Kimberley moved to be based out of Malta.

=== Special duties ===
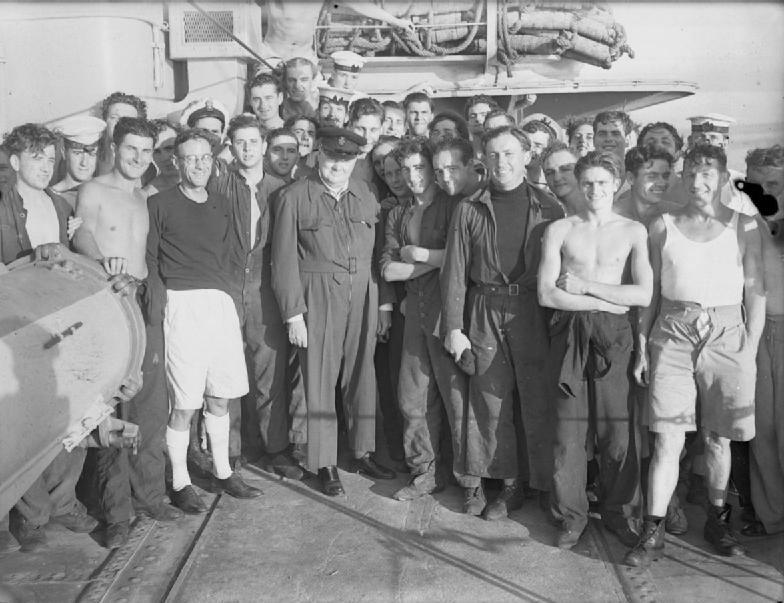
Winston Churchill with members of Kimberley's crew

In July she was nominated to take part in special duties during the planned allied landings in the south of France (Operation Dragoon). On 14 August she embarked Admiral John Cunningham, the Commander in Chief Mediterranean, so that he could monitor the passage of the assault convoys through the Straits of Bonifacio. He then sent the signal to commence Operation Dragoon whilst aboard Kimberley. On 15 August Kimberley embarked Prime Minister Winston Churchill, for a visit to the assault area, and on 16 August she re-embarked Cunningham, with the military commander General Henry Maitland Wilson, for a visit to the landing beaches. After she had been released from special duties, Kimberley was sent to patrol in the Adriatic Sea, supporting military operations. She joined up with the destroyers HMS Undine, HMS Urchin and HMS Loyal, and the river gunboats HMS Aphis and HMS Scarab, in preparation for supporting the British Army's advance up the east coast of Italy.

=== Off the Greek coast ===
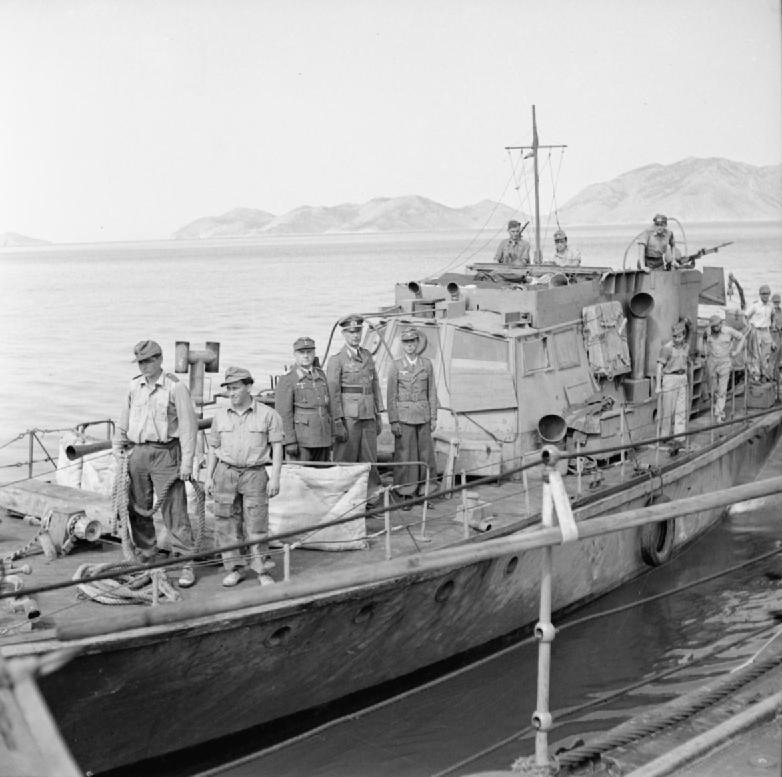
The German delegation, aboard a captured British motor launch, come alongside Kimberley to formally surrender

On 1 September she began a series of bombardments in the Rimini area, and having completed these by 13 September she resumed her patrolling. In October she was transferred to the British Aegean Force, in order to support the landings to reoccupy the Greek mainland (Operation Manna). She intercepted the hospital ship Gradisca on 29 October, and took her as a prize. She carried out interception patrols throughout November, in order to prevent the evacuation of German personnel from occupied territory. On 5 November she sank an F lighter off Piscopi and carried out a bombardment at Alimnia on 11 November. She remained in the Aegean throughout December and in January 1945 was acting in support of operations on the Greek mainland. She was at Athens during the communist rising.

Kimberley took part in a raid on Rhodes on 1 May with HMS Catterick and the Greek destroyer Kriti. She was off Rhodes on 8 May 1945 when Major General Wagner, Commander of German forces in the Dodecanese, and two of his staff officers came aboard her to formally surrender. They came alongside on a motor launch they had captured from the British some months previously. The Kimberley took Wagner to the island of Symi, where the unconditional surrender of German forces in the region was signed. Kimberley landed an armed party the next day and confined the Germans to quarters. She later transported the 117 Germans to Alexandria. She remained in the Mediterranean after the end of the war, taking passage to the UK in August. She was paid off in September, was de-stored and then reduced to the reserve.

== Post war ==
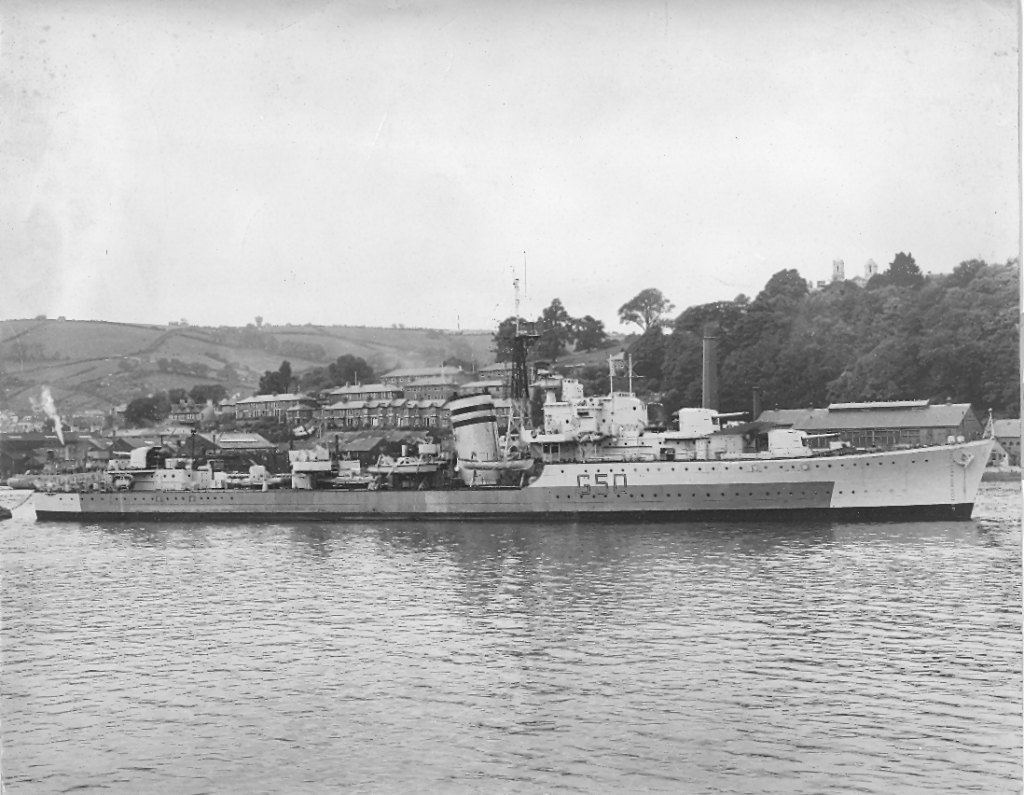
HMS Kimberley (G50) laid up in Dartmouth after WWII

Kimberley was initially laid up at Dartmouth, but was then transferred to Harwich. She was placed on the disposal list in 1948, and was then selected to take part in ship target trials in the Clyde area. She was towed there from Harwich, and after these had been completed, she was sold to West of Scotland Shipbreakers on 30 March 1949. HMS Kimberley arrived at their yards at Troon in June for scrapping, one of only two of the K class to have survived the war.
