= SS The Ramsey =

1895 passenger steamer in the United Kingdom

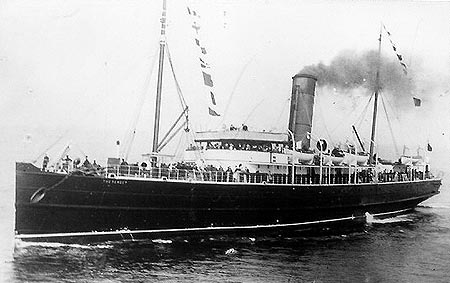
- The Ramsey.

History
- Name: 1895–1911: Duke of Lancaster; 1912–1914: The Ramsey; 1914–1915: Ramsey
- Owner: 1895–1911: Lancashire and Yorkshire Railway & London and North Western Railway companies; 1912–1915: Isle of Man Steam Packet Company
- Port of registry: 1895–1911: Fleetwood, United Kingdom; 1912–1915: Douglas, Isle of Man
- Route: 1895–1911: Fleetwood - Belfast; 1912–1914: Douglas – Liverpool
- Builder: Naval Construction & Armaments Co, Barrow-in-Furness
- Yard number: 243
- Launched: 9 May 1895
- Identification: ON 104240
- Fate: Sunk 8 August 1915

General characteristics
- Type: Ferry
- Tonnage: 1,520 GRT
- Length: 310 ft 2 in (94.5 m)
- Beam: 37 ft 1 in (11.3 m)
- Depth: 16 ft (4.9 m)
- Ice class: N/A
- Installed power: 5,300 shp (4,000 kW)
- Propulsion: Twin screw, steam turbine
- Speed: 19 knots (35 km/h; 22 mph)
- Capacity: 1162 passengers
- Crew: 42

SS or RMS The Ramsey was a passenger steamer operated by the Isle of Man Steam Packet Company from 1912 to 1914. She had been built in 1895 as Duke of Lancaster for the joint service to Belfast of the London and North Western Railway and Lancashire and Yorkshire Railway companies. The steamer was requisitioned by the Admiralty in 1914 as the armed boarding vessel HMS Ramsey and sunk the following year.

== Construction ==
Duke of Lancaster was launched on 9 May 1895 at the Barrow-in-Furness yard of the Naval Construction & Armaments Co, who also constructed the engines and boilers.

The vessel initially had a tonnage of 1,520 grt and 467 nrt; length 310 ft 2 in, 94.54 m; beam 37 ft 1 in, 11.30 m; depth 16 ft 4 in, 4.98 m. Duke of Lancaster had an operating speed of 19 knots (35 km/h; 22 mph).

== Service life ==
=== London & North Western Railway Company ===
Duke of Lancaster entered service with the Lancashire and Yorkshire Railway Company who operated her with the London & North Western Railway Company on the Fleetwood - Belfast service.

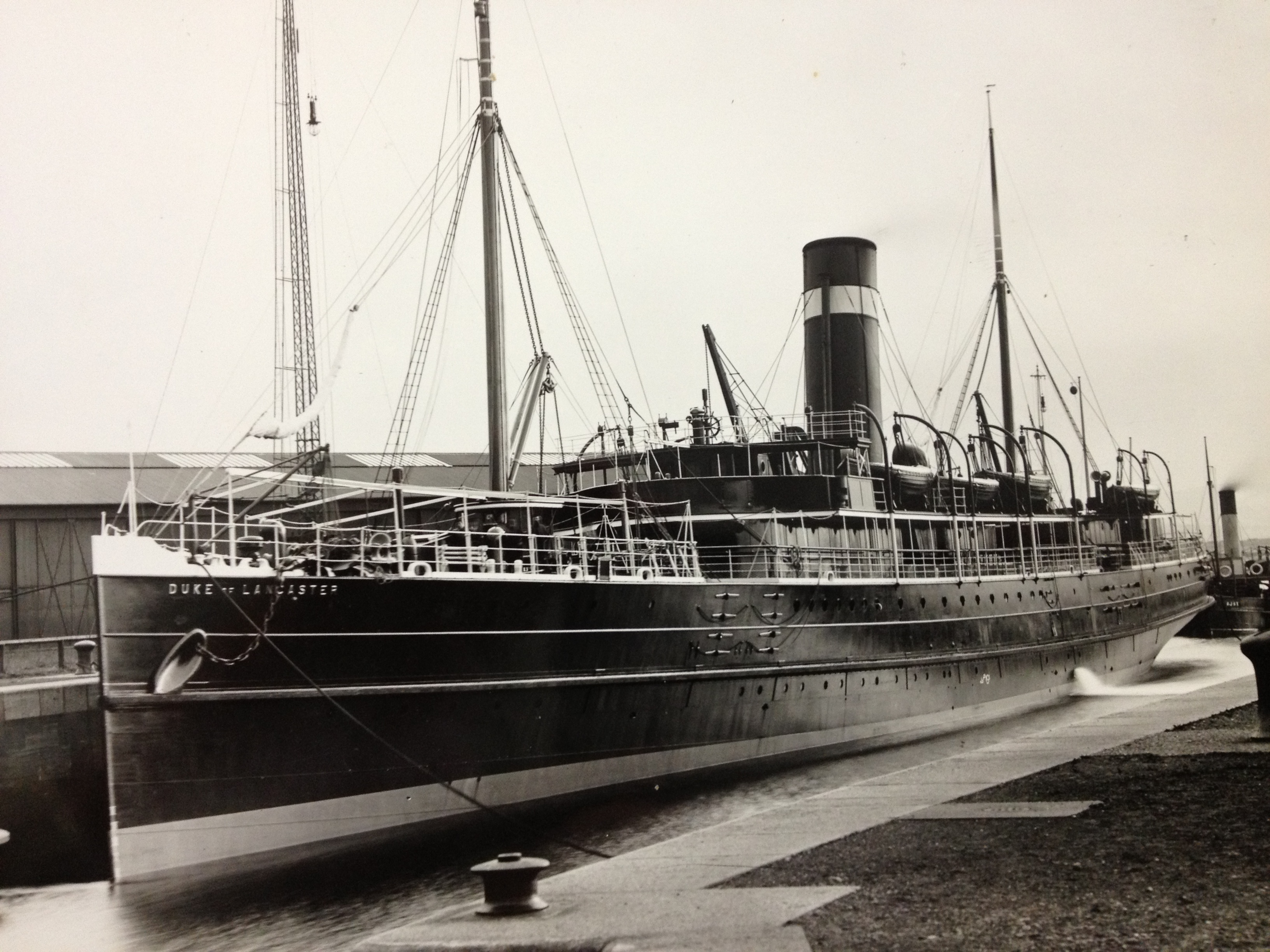
Duke of Lancaster in London & North Western Railway Company service.

In March 1911, Duke of Lancaster was sold to an organisation named the Turkish Patriotic Committee, who had the engines and boilers renovated at Cammell Laird. (Note: Also reported that Duke of Lancaster, along with near-sisters Duke of York and Duke of Cornwall, was sent by the Lancashire & Yorkshire Railway Company to H & G Grayson Ltd, Liverpool "for reboilering and extensive alterations" in Spring 1911.) However, the outbreak of the Italo-Turkish War in September 1911, prevented the purchasers from taking delivery, and the vessel was sold in 1912 to the Isle of Man Steam Packet Company.

=== Isle of Man Steam Packet Company ===
The Isle of Man Steam Packet Company took delivery of the vessel in July 1912, and immediately changed the vessel's name to The Ramsey. (Note: The inclusion of "The" was reported to be a clerical error; just Ramsey had been intended.) She had an uneventful career with the company as she established herself within the Steam Packet fleet.

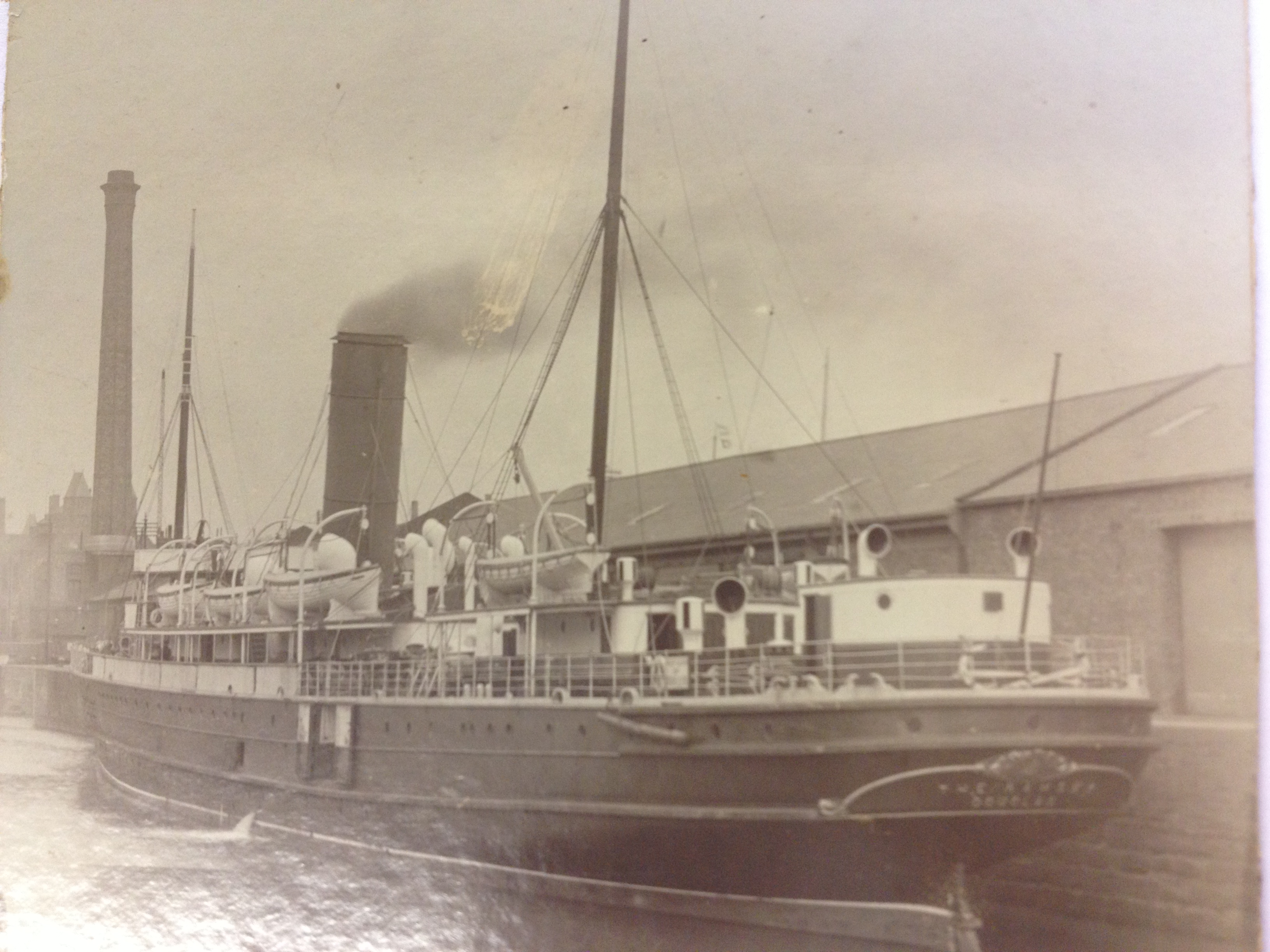
The Ramsey

The Ramsey's service with the company was one of the shortest of any ship in its history, and concluded at the end of the 1914 season.

== War service and loss ==
The Ramsey was the third of the Isle of Man Steam Packet Company's ships to be called up for service in the Great War. On 28 October 1914 she was requisitioned and fitted out as an Armed Boarding Vessel by Cammell Laird with two 12-pounder guns and a ship's company of 98, and renamed simply HMS Ramsey.

Ramsey was based at Scapa Flow under the command of Lieutenant Harry Raby. Her work consisted of night patrols during the course of which she was usually accompanying two destroyers. It was dangerous work, directed by radio from headquarters, carried out without navigation lights, and with manned guns throughout. In the course of a few months Ramsey intercepted and challenged many ships, sometimes putting a prize crew aboard and taking the suspect into port.

On her last patrol she had steamed for 12 hours when, after dawn on 8 August 1915, smoke was seen from over the horizon. Ramsey gave chase and came upon a steamer flying the Russian flag. Ramsey proceeded alongside the vessel, which had duly stopped. The suspect, which was the German auxiliary minelayer SMS Meteor, then hoisted the German flag and fired at what amounted to point-blank range, killing the commander and crew members on the bridge of Ramsey.

At the same time the raider fired a torpedo, shattering Ramsey″s stern. Fifty five of the crew were killed; Meteor picked up 43 after Ramsey went down in five minutes. Her wreck position is given as 59°36′N 001°25′W.

The next day British forces overwhelmed Meteor, whose prisoners were transferred to neutral ships before she was scuttled.
