= HMS Khartoum =

Destroyer of the Royal Navy

Coordinates: 12°38′0″N 43°24′0″E

History

United Kingdom
- Name: HMS Khartoum
- Ordered: March 1937
- Builder: Swan Hunter, Tyne and Wear, United Kingdom
- Laid down: 27 October 1937
- Launched: 6 February 1939
- Commissioned: November 1939
- In service: 6 November 1939
- Out of service: February–April 1940
- Identification: pennant number: F45/G45
- Fate: Partially sank in harbor of Red Sea island, Perim, after an exploding torpedo air vessel set off a fire which reached the aft magazine. 23 June 1940
- Notes: Badge: On a Field barry wavy of Blue and White a camel, Gold.

General characteristics (as built)
- Class & type: K-class destroyer
- Displacement: 1,690 long tons (1,720 t) (standard); 2,330 long tons (2,370 t) (deep load)
- Length: 356 ft 6 in (108.66 m) o/a
- Beam: 35 ft 9 in (10.90 m)
- Draught: 12 ft 6 in (3.81 m) (deep)
- Installed power: 44,000 shp (33,000 kW); 2 × Admiralty 3-drum boilers
- Propulsion: 2 × shafts; 2 × geared steam turbines
- Speed: 36 knots (67 km/h; 41 mph)
- Range: 5,500 nmi (10,200 km; 6,300 mi) at 15 knots (28 km/h; 17 mph)
- Complement: 183 (218 for flotilla leaders)
- Sensors & processing systems: ASDIC
- Armament: 3 × twin 4.7 in (120 mm) guns; 1 × quadruple 2 pdr (40 mm (1.6 in) AA guns; 2 × quadruple 0.5 in (12.7 mm) anti-aircraft machineguns; 2 × quintuple 21 in (533 mm) torpedo tubes; 1 × rack, 2 × throwers for depth charges

HMS Khartoum was a K-class destroyer of the Royal Navy, named after the capital of Sudan, Khartoum.

== History ==
Khartoum was launched on 6 February 1939. Her initial action occurred on 19 December 1939, during deployment in the Firth of Clyde, when she was subject to an unsuccessful torpedo attack by a submarine near Holy Isle. She then carried out an anti-submarine search for 24 hours without success. In February 1940, she was deployed for escort of convoys to Norway based at Rosyth where she sustained structural damage during anti-submarine operations at high speed in heavy weather and was sent to Falmouth for repair. On completion in May 1940, she took passage to come under the Commander-in-Chief, The Nore to help evacuate personnel from the Netherlands and Belgium but developed a machinery defect and was taken to Portsmouth for two days of repair, where her pennant number for visual signaling purposes changed to G45.

On 8 May she was nominated for service with the 14th Destroyer Flotilla in the Mediterranean Sea and on 16 May, took passage from Plymouth for Gibraltar with sister destroyer Kandahar. On 23 May, they joined the flotilla at Alexandria, Egypt, and deployed for screening and patrol duties. Khartoum and Kandahar detached with other K-class destroyers Kimberley and Kingston for surveillance of Italian warship movements from Massawa on the Red Sea.

In June 1940, Khartoum deployed in the Red Sea with sloops of the East Indies Squadron and her other sister destroyers and prepared for war service in defense of Red Sea shipping. On 10 June, after the outbreak of war, she deployed for patrol and convoy defense based at Aden. On 21 June she carried out an attack on Torricelli, a Brin-class submarine, which was unsuccessful. Then, on 23 June, she was deployed with Kandahar, Kingston and the sloop Shoreham in search for Torricelli near Perim Island. After interception, Khartoum and these warships took part in a surface engagement with the submarine, during which Torricelli was sunk and Shoreham damaged. However, during the battle, Khartoum was hit by return fire which damaged the after torpedo tube mounting.

== Loss ==
Some five and a half hours later, at 11.50am (local time), a torpedo's compressed air chamber exploded, propelling the warhead through the deck house of number 3 4.7-inch mount. and causing a serious uncontrollable fire from a ruptured oil tank there. This resulted in an explosion of the ship's magazine, killing one of the ship's company, injuring three others and wrecking the stern structure aft of the engine room while causing extensive flooding. The ship beached on an even keel with forward structure awash and the ship's company was rescued by Kandahar and taken to Aden, Yemen. Yeoman of Signals John Murphy was awarded a Mention in Despatches for his actions in securing the ship's code books. The ship's equipment was dismantled and other security measures were implemented before the ship was abandoned. The shipwreck, in position 12º38'N, 43º24'E, remained visible after the end of World War II.

== Confusion over cause of sinking ==
Some sources regard the damage from Torricelli (a hit in one area of the ship, followed by an explosion there later) as instrumental in Khartoum's sinking. Others regard it as coincidental, pointing to the five and a half hour time lag between the incidents. They also suggest her loss seems more due to inexperienced damage control. The Admiralty inquest found the immediate cause of the loss was a torpedo air flask explosion which caused an uncontrollable fire and magazine explosion. It noted that similar incidents with the Mark IX torpedo had occurred on other ships. The inquest also ruled out damage from enemy action and sabotage.

== Bibliography ==
- Colledge, J. J.; Warlow, Ben (2006) [1969]. Ships of the Royal Navy: The Complete Record of All Fighting Ships of the Royal Navy from the 15th Century to the Present (3rd Rev ed.). London: Chatham Publishing. ISBN 978-1-86176-281-8. OCLC 67375475.
- English, John (2001). Afridi to Nizam: British Fleet Destroyers 1937–43. Gravesend, Kent: World Ship Society. ISBN 0-905617-64-9.
- Friedman, Norman (2006). British Destroyers & Frigates: The Second World War and After. Annapolis, Maryland: Naval Institute Press. ISBN 1-86176-137-6.
- Langtree, Charles (2002). The Kelly's: British J, K, and N Class Destroyers of World War II. Annapolis, Maryland: Naval Institute Press. ISBN 1-55750-422-9.
- Lenton, H. T. (1998). British & Empire Warships of the Second World War. Annapolis, Maryland: Naval Institute Press. ISBN 1-55750-048-7.
- March, Edgar J. (1966). British Destroyers: A History of Development, 1892–1953; Drawn by Admiralty Permission From Official Records & Returns, Ships' Covers & Building Plans. London: Seeley Service. OCLC 164893555.
- Rohwer, Jürgen (2005). Chronology of the War at Sea 1939–1945: The Naval History of World War Two (Third Revised ed.). Annapolis, Maryland: Naval Institute Press. ISBN 1-59114-119-2.
- Whitley, M. J. (1988). Destroyers of World War 2. Annapolis, Maryland: Naval Institute Press. ISBN 0-87021-326-1.
