= Harald Gelhaus =

German U-boat commander

- Born: 24 July 1915; Göttingen
- Died: 2 December 1997 (aged 82); Bochum
- Military career
- Allegiance: Nazi Germany
- Branch: Kriegsmarine
- Service years: 1935–45
- Rank: Kapitänleutnant
- Commands: U-143; U-107
- Conflicts: World War II: Battle of the Atlantic
- Awards: Knight's Cross of the Iron Cross

Harald Gelhaus (24 July 1915 in Göttingen – 2 December 1997 in Bochum) was a German U-boat commander in World War II and recipient of the Knight's Cross of the Iron Cross of Nazi Germany. As commander of U-143 and U-107 Gelhaus is credited with the sinking of 19 ships (including SS Clan Alpine) for a total of 100,373 gross register tons (GRT) and further damaging one ship of 10,068 GRT.

== Awards ==
- Wehrmacht Long Service Award 4th Class (5 April 1939)
- Iron Cross (1939)
  - 2nd Class (31 October 1940)
  - 1st Class (24 February 1941)
- U-boat War Badge (1939) (31 December 1940)
- U-boat Front Clasp in Bronze (1 October 1944)
- Knight's Cross of the Iron Cross on 26 March 1943 as Kapitänleutnant and commander of U-107
- War Merit Cross 2nd Class with Swords (1 September 1944)
