= HMS Shoreham (L32) =

Sloop of the Royal Navy

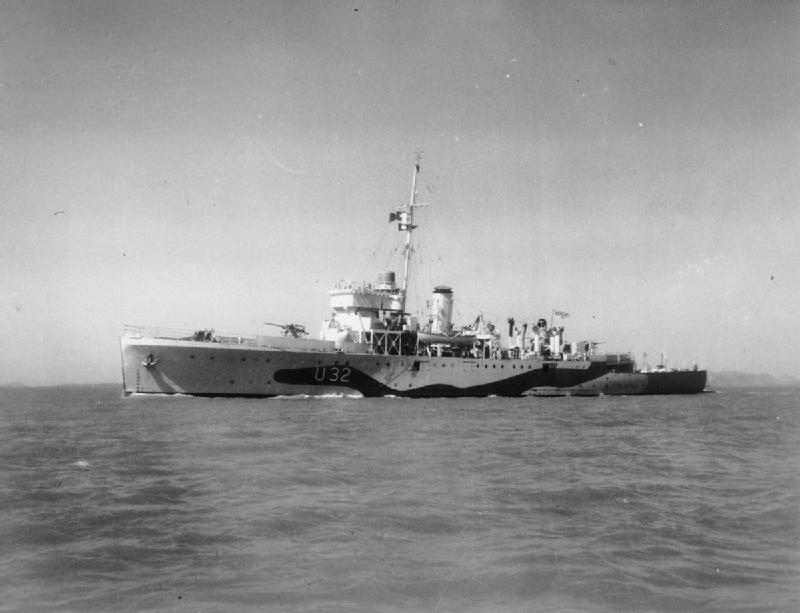
- HMS Shoreham in 1943

History

United Kingdom
- Name: HMS Shoreham
- Ordered: 23 September 1929
- Builder: Chatham Dockyard
- Laid down: 19 December 1929
- Launched: 22 November 1930
- Completed: 2 November 1931
- Identification: Pennant number: L32 (later U32)
- Fate: Scrapped November 1950

General characteristics
- Class & type: Shoreham-class sloop
- Displacement: 1,150 tons
- Length: 281 ft (86 m)
- Beam: 35 ft (11 m)
- Draught: 8 ft 3 in (2.51 m)
- Propulsion: Geared turbines; two shafts; 2,000 shp (1,500 kW)
- Speed: 16 knots (30 km/h)
- Complement: 95
- Armament: 2 × QF 4-inch (102 mm) Mk V guns (2×1)

HMS Shoreham was the lead ship of the Shoreham-class of sloops built for the British Royal Navy. Completed in 1931, Shoreham served pre-war in the Persian Gulf. In the Second World War she served in the Gulf and Red Sea, the Mediterranean and the Indian Ocean. She survived the war and was sold for commercial use in 1946 and was scrapped in 1950.

== Construction and design ==
The British Admiralty ordered four sloops of the new Shoreham class as part of the 1929 construction programme, with two each ordered from Devonport and Chatham dockyards. They were an improved version of the Hastings class of the 1928 programme, which were themselves a modification of the Bridgewater class. They were intended for a dual role of patrol service in overseas stations in peacetime and minesweeping during war.

Shoreham was 281 feet 4 inches (85.75 m) long overall, with a beam of 35 feet (10.67 m) and a draught of 10 feet 4 inches (3.15 m). Displacement was 1,100 long tons (1,100 t) standard. Two Admiralty 3-drum water-tube boilers fed two geared steam turbines which drove two propeller shafts. The machinery was rated at 2,000 shaft horsepower (1,500 kW), giving a speed of 16.5 knots (30.6 km/h; 19.0 mph).

The ship's main gun armament consisted of two 4-inch (102 mm) QF Mk V guns mounted fore-and-aft on the ship's centreline, with the forward gun on a High-Angle (HA) anti-aircraft mounting and the aft gun on a Low-Angle (LA) mounting, suitable only for use against surface targets. Four 3-pounder saluting guns completed the ship's gun armament. The initial anti-submarine armament consisted of four depth charges.

Shoreham was ordered on 23 September 1929 and was laid down at Chatham on 19 December 1929. She was launched on 22 November 1930 and completed on 2 November 1931.

=== Modifications ===
One of Shoreham's 4-inch guns was removed in 1933, but was reinstated in 1934. In 1938, Shoreham's anti-aircraft armament was improved by replacing the aft 4-inch gun by a similar gun on a HA mounting, while a quadruple Vickers .50 machine gun mount was fitted for close-in anti-aircraft duties. During the Second World War, the ship's 3-pounder saluting guns were removed to accommodate more useful armament. The ship's anti aircraft armament was gradually increased, first by fitted a second quadruple machine gun mount, and then by the addition of Oerlikon 20 mm cannons and finally a 2-pounder "pom-pom" anti-aircraft gun, giving an ultimate anti-aircraft outfit of three Oerlikons and one 2-pounder. One 3-pounder saluting gun was re-instated after the war, when Shoreham returned to the Gulf.

The ship's anti-submarine armament was also gradually increased during the war, with the number of depth charges carried increasing from 15 to as many as 60–90. Other wartime changes included the fitting of radar and HF/DF radio direction-finding gear.

== Service ==
On commissioning, Shoreham was deployed to the Persian Gulf, where she served continuously, except for refits, until the outbreak of the Second World War. She was refitted at Colombo in Ceylon in October 1932, and at Bombay in 1933, 1934 and 1938. In January 1939, Shoreham was refitted and rearmed at Malta, before returning to the Gulf.

The outbreak of war saw Shoreham continue to be based in the Gulf, patrolling and checking shipping for contraband. In May 1940 the ship transferred to the Red Sea. Italy's declaration of war on 10 June 1940 brought Royal Navy forces in the Red Sea into conflict with the Italian Red Sea Flotilla. On 18 June 1940 the Italian submarine Galileo Galilei was spotted off Aden by a patrolling aircraft and attacked unsuccessfully by two RAF bombers. Shoreham and the destroyer Kandahar were sent out to intercept, but a depth charge attack by Khandahar was unsuccessful and the submarine escaped. On 23 June 1940, Shoreham, together with the destroyers Khandahar, Khartoum and Kingston encountered the Italian submarine Torricelli off Perim Island. A gun duel between the British ships and Torricelli took place in which both Shoreham and Khartoum were hit by shells from the Italian submarine and Toricelli was sunk. Several hours later, Khartoum was sunk when a fire resulting from the action caused one of her magazines to explode. On 3 August 1940, Italy invaded British Somaliland. The British position soon became untenable, and it was decided to evacuate the British troops from the port of Berbera. The evacuation began on 14 August, with Shoreham taking part in the evacuation. In total, 7140 people were evacuated to Aden by the time the evacuation ended on 19 August.

On 23 May 1941, Shoreham intercepted the German merchant ship Oder, which had left Massawa earlier that day, near Perim. Oder scuttled herself. Shoreham was refitted in Bombay in April–May 1941, after which she moved back to the Persian Gulf. On 25 August 1941 Britain and the Soviet Union invaded Iran. Shoreham was assigned to the attack on Abadan, covering the landing of the 24th Indian Infantry Brigade which was tasked with taking the oil refineries in the city. The landings took the Iranians by surprise, and Shoreham sank the Palang which was berthed in the port. After the invasion was completed Shoreham returned to the Red Sea, serving as anti-aircraft guard ship at Suez, and in January 1942 transferred to the Eastern Fleet, based at Colombo. Shoreham was refitted at Bombay from October 1942 to February 1943 and then moved to the Mediterranean, joining the Levant Command.

On 10 July 1943 Shoreham was part of the naval force supporting Operation Husky, the Allied invasion of Sicily. In September 1943 Shoreham returned to the Eastern fleet, escorting convoys off the West coast of India. From March to June 1944 Shoreham was refitted at Cape Town and then returned to the Eastern Fleet, where she was employed on convoy escort of the East coast of India. On 2 January 1945, Shoreham took part in Operation Lightning, landing of British and Indian troops on the Akyab peninsular, with Shoreham helping to land troops of the 3rd Commando Brigade. She was refitted at Durban in April 1945, then returned to her escort duties, which continued until the end of the war.

After the end of the war, Shoreham was transferred to the Persian Gulf, where she served until July 1946. She then returned to Britain for the first time since her commissioning, and was laid up for disposal. Shoreham was sold on 4 November 1946 for commercial service, and was renamed Jorge F El Joven. She was scrapped at Zeebrugge from November 1950.

== Bibliography ==
- Campbell, N. J. M. (1980). "Great Britain (including Empire Forces)". In Chesneau, Roger (ed.). Conway's All the World's Fighting Ships 1922–1946. Greenwich, UK: Conway Maritime Press. pp. 2–85. ISBN 0-85177-146-7.
- Colledge, J. J.; Warlow, Ben & Bush, Steve (2020). Ships of the Royal Navy: The Complete Record of all Fighting Ships of the Royal Navy from the 15th Century to the Present (5th revised and updated ed.). Barnsley, UK: Seaforth Publishing. ISBN 978-1-5267-9327-0.
- Collins, J.T.E. (1964). The Royal Indian Navy, 1939–1945. Official History of the Indian Armed Forces In the Second World War. New Delhi: Combined Inter-Services Historical Section (India & Pakistan).
- English, John (2001). Afridi to Nizam: British Fleet Destroyers 1937 – 43. Gravesend, UK: World Ship Society. ISBN 0-905617-64-9.
- Gardiner, Robert; Chesneau, Roger, eds. (1980). Conway's All the World's Fighting Ships 1922-1946. London: Conway Maritime Press. ISBN 0-85177-146-7.
- Hague, Arnold (1993). Sloops: A History of the 71 Sloops Built in Britain and Australia for the British, Australian and Indian Navies 1926–1946. Kendal, UK: World Ship Society. ISBN 0-905617-67-3.
- Rohwer, Jürgen; Hümmelchen, Gerhard (1992). Chronology of the War at Sea 1939–1945. London: Greenhill Books. ISBN 1-85367-117-7.
- Shores, Christopher (1996). Dust Clouds In The Middle East: The Air War for East Africa, Iraq, Syria, Iran and Madagascar, 1940–42. London: Grub Street. ISBN 1-898697-37-X.
