= German submarine U-107 (1940) =

German World War II submarine

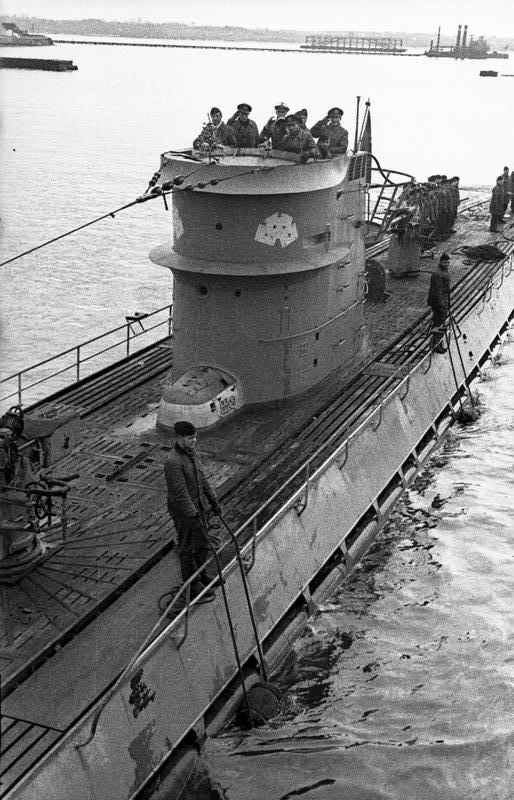
- U-107 at Lorient in November 1941

History

Nazi Germany
- Name: U-107
- Ordered: 24 May 1938
- Builder: DeSchiMAG AG Weser, Bremen
- Yard number: 970
- Laid down: 6 December 1939
- Launched: 2 July 1940
- Commissioned: 8 October 1940
- Home port: Lorient, France
- Fate: Sunk, 18 August 1944

General characteristics
- Class & type: Type IXB U-boat
- Displacement: 1,051 t (1,034 long tons) surfaced; 1,178 t (1,159 long tons) submerged
- Length: 76.50 m (251 ft) o/a; 58.75 m (192 ft 9 in) pressure hull
- Beam: 6.76 m (22 ft 2 in) o/a; 4.40 m (14 ft 5 in) pressure hull
- Draught: 4.70 m (15 ft 5 in)
- Installed power: 4,400 PS (3,200 kW; 4,300 bhp) (diesels); 1,000 PS (740 kW; 990 shp) (electric)
- Propulsion: 2 shafts; 2 × diesel engines; 2 × electric motors
- Speed: 18.2 knots (33.7 km/h; 20.9 mph) surfaced; 7.3 knots (13.5 km/h; 8.4 mph) submerged
- Range: 12,000 nmi (22,000 km; 14,000 mi) at 10 knots (19 km/h; 12 mph) surfaced; 64 nmi (119 km; 74 mi) at 4 knots (7.4 km/h; 4.6 mph) submerged
- Test depth: 230 m (750 ft)
- Complement: 48 to 56 officers and ratings
- Armament: 6 × torpedo tubes (4 bow, 2 stern); 22 × 53.3 cm (21 in) torpedoes; 1 × 10.5 cm SK C/32 naval gun (180 rounds); 1 × 3.7 cm (1.5 in) SK C/30 AA gun; 1 × 2 cm FlaK 30 AA guns

Service record
- Part of: 2nd U-boat Flotilla; 8 October 1940 – 18 August 1944
- Identification codes: M 39 808
- Commanders: K.Kapt. Günter Hessler; 8 October 1940 – 1 December 1941; Kptlt. Harald Gelhaus; 1 December 1941 – 6 June 1943; Kptlt. Volker Simmermacher; July 1943 – August 1944; Lt.z.S. Karl-Heinz Fritz; August – 18 August 1944
- Operations: 13 patrols: 1st patrol: 24 January – 1 March 1941; 2nd patrol: 29 March – 2 July 1941; 3rd patrol: 6 September – 11 November 1941; 4th patrol: 10 – 26 December 1941; 5th patrol: 7 January – 7 March 1942; 6th patrol: 21 April – 11 July 1942; 7th patrol: 15 August – 18 November 1942; 8th patrol: 30 January – 25 March 1943; 9th patrol: 24 April – 26 May 1943; 10th patrol: a. 28 July – 3 October 1943; b. 10 – 12 November 1943; 11th patrol: a. 16 November 1943 – 8 January 1944; b. 30 April – 2 May 1944; 12th patrol: 10 May – 23 July 1944; 13th patrol: 16 – 18 Aug 1944
- Victories: 37 merchant ships sunk (207,375 GRT); 2 auxiliary warships sunk (10,411 GRT); 3 merchant ships damaged (17,392 GRT); 1 auxiliary warship damaged (8,246 GRT)

German submarine U-107 was a Type IXB U-boat of Nazi Germany's Kriegsmarine that operated during World War II. Between January 1941 and August 1944, she sailed on 13 active patrols at a time when a U-boat averaged a lifespan of seven to ten patrols. During that time, U-107 sank 39 Allied ships and damaged four. The U-boat was launched on 2 July 1940, based at the U-boat port of Lorient, with a crew of 53 under the initial command of Günter Hessler. She was later commanded, in order, by Harald Gelhaus, Valker Simmermacher and her final commander, Karl Heinz Fritz.

== Design ==
Type IXB submarines were slightly larger than the original Type IX submarines, later designated IXA. U-107 had a displacement of 1,051 tonnes (1,034 long tons) when at the surface and 1,178 tonnes (1,159 long tons) while submerged. The U-boat had a total length of 76.50 m (251 ft), a pressure hull length of 58.75 m (192 ft 9 in), a beam of 6.76 m (22 ft 2 in), a height of 9.60 m (31 ft 6 in), and a draught of 4.70 m (15 ft 5 in). The submarine was powered by two MAN M 9 V 40/46 supercharged four-stroke, nine-cylinder diesel engines producing a total of 4,400 metric horsepower (3,240 kW; 4,340 shp) for use while surfaced, two Siemens-Schuckert 2 GU 345/34 double-acting electric motors producing a total of 1,000 metric horsepower (740 kW; 990 shp) for use while submerged. She had two shafts and two 1.92 m (6 ft) propellers. The boat was capable of operating at depths of up to 230 metres (750 ft).

The submarine had a maximum surface speed of 18.2 knots (33.7 km/h; 20.9 mph) and a maximum submerged speed of 7.3 knots (13.5 km/h; 8.4 mph). When submerged, the boat could operate for 64 nautical miles (119 km; 74 mi) at 4 knots (7.4 km/h; 4.6 mph); when surfaced, she could travel 12,000 nautical miles (22,000 km; 14,000 mi) at 10 knots (19 km/h; 12 mph). U-107 was fitted with six 53.3 cm (21 in) torpedo tubes (four fitted at the bow and two at the stern), 22 torpedoes, one 10.5 cm (4.13 in) SK C/32 naval gun, 180 rounds, and a 3.7 cm (1.5 in) SK C/30 as well as a 2 cm (0.79 in) C/30 anti-aircraft gun. The boat had a complement of forty-eight.

== Service history ==
=== First patrol ===
Date	Name	Flag	Tonnage (Note: Merchant ship tonnages are in gross register tons which is a measure of internal capacity. Military vessels are listed by tons displacement which is a measure of ship weight.)	Convoy	Position
3 February 1941	Empire Citizen	United Kingdom	4,683	Convoy OB 279	58°12′N 23°22′W
3 February 1941	Crispin	Royal Navy	5,051	Convoy OB 280	56°38′N 20°05′W
6 February 1941	Maplecourt	Canada	3,388	Convoy SC 20	57°33′N 17°24′W
23 February 1941	Manistee	Royal Navy	5,360	Convoy OB 288	58°13′N 21°33′W

=== Second patrol and most successful period ===
Date	Name	Flag	Tonnage (GRT)	Convoy	Position
8 April 1941	Helena Margareta	United Kingdom	3,316	Convoy OG 57	33°00′N 23°52′W
8 April 1941	Eskdene	United Kingdom	3,829	Convoy OG 57	34°43′N 24°21′W
9 April 1941	Harpathian	United Kingdom	4,671	Convoy OG 57	32°22′N 22°53′W
9 April 1941	Duffield	United Kingdom	8,516	Convoy OG 57	31°13′N 23°24′W
21 April 1941	Calchas	United Kingdom	10,305		23°50′N 27°00′W
30 April 1941	Lassell	United Kingdom	7,417	Convoy OB 309	12°55′N 28°56′W
17 May 1941	Marisa	Netherlands	8,029		06°10′N 18°09′W
18 May 1941	Piako	United Kingdom	8,286		07°52′N 14°57′W
27 May 1941	Colonial	United Kingdom	5,108	Convoy OB 318	09°13′N 15°09′W
28 May 1941	Papalemos	Greece	3,748		08°06′N 16°18′W
31 May 1941	Sire	United Kingdom	5,664		08°50′N 15°30′W
1 June 1941	Alfred Jones	United Kingdom	5,013	Convoy OB 320	08°00′N 15°00′W
8 June 1941	Adda	United Kingdom	7,816	Convoy OB 323	08°30′N 14°39′W
13 June 1941	Pandias	Greece	4,981		07°49′N 23°28′W

=== Third patrol ===
Date	Name	Flag	Tonnage (GRT)	Convoy	Position
24 September 1941	Dixcove	United Kingdom	3,790	Convoy SL 87	31°12′N 23°41′W
24 September 1941	Lafian	United Kingdom	4,876	Convoy SL 87	31°12′N 23°32′W
24 September 1941	John Holt	United Kingdom	4,975	Convoy SL 87	31°12′N 23°32′W

=== Fifth patrol ===
Date	Name	Flag	Tonnage (GRT)	Convoy	Position
31 January 1942	San Arcadio	United Kingdom	7,419		38°10′N 63°50′W
6 February 1942	Major Wheeler	United States	3,431		E of Cape Hatteras
21 February 1942	Egda	Norway	10,068	Convoy ON 65	41°12′N 52°55′W Damaged

=== Sixth patrol ===
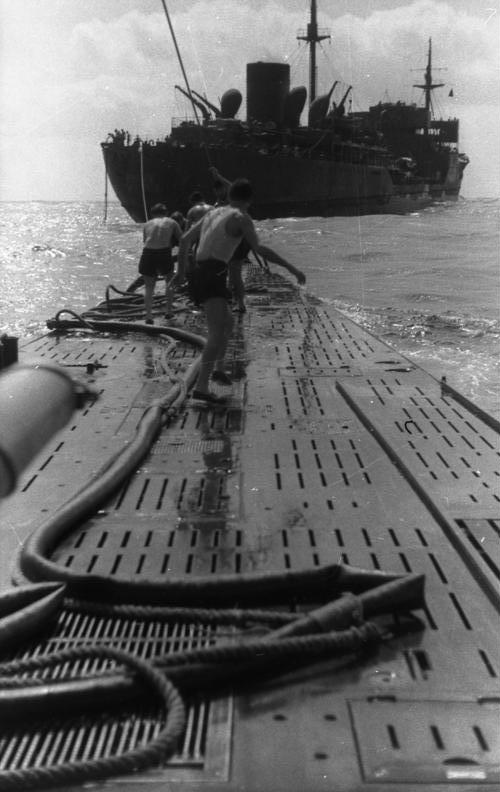
U-107 meets a supply ship in the South Atlantic

Date	Name	Flag	Tonnage (GRT)	Convoy	Position
29 May 1942	Western Head	United Kingdom	2,599		19°57′N 74°18′W
1 June 1942	Bushranger	Panama	4,536		18°15′N 81°25′W
7 June 1942	Castilla	Honduras	3,910		20°15′N 83°18′W
8 June 1942	Suwied	United States	3,249		20°00′N 84°48′W
10 June 1942	Merrimack	United States	2,606		19°47′N 85°55′W
19 June 1942	Cheerio	United States	35		18°02′N 67°40′W
26 June 1942	Jagersfontein	Netherlands	10,083		31°56′N 54°48′W

=== Eighth patrol ===
Date	Name	Flag	Tonnage (GRT)	Convoy	Position
3 September 1942	Hollinside	United Kingdom	4,172		38°00′N 09°00′W
3 September 1942	Penrose	United Kingdom	4,393		38°00′N 09°00′W
7 October 1942	Andalucia Star	United Kingdom	14,943		06°38′N 15°46′W

=== Ninth patrol ===
- 4 March 1943, came under attack from an unidentified Allied aircraft.

Moderately damaged by the attack.

- 22 March 1943 at 14:35 she came under attack from another unidentified Allied aircraft

Undamaged

Date	Name	Flag	Tonnage (GRT)	Convoy	Position
22 February 1943	Roxborough Castle	United Kingdom	7,801		38°12′N 26°22′W
13 March 1943	Oporto	United Kingdom	2,352	Convoy OS 44	42°45′N 13°31′W
13 March 1943	Marcella	United Kingdom	4,592	Convoy OS 44	42°45′N 13°31′W
13 March 1943	Sembilangan	Netherlands	4,990	Convoy OS 44	42°45′N 13°31′W
13 March 1943	SS Clan Alpine	United Kingdom	5,442	Convoy OS 44	42°45′N 13°31′W

=== Tenth patrol ===
Date	Name	Flag	Tonnage (GRT)	Convoy	Position
1 May 1943	Port Victor	United Kingdom	12,411		47°49′N 22°02′W

=== Eleventh patrol ===
Date	Name	Flag	Tonnage (Note: Merchant ship tonnages are in gross register tons. Military vessels are listed by tons displacement.)	Convoy	Position
28 August 1943	Albert Gallatin	United States	7,176		Off Savannah, Georgia Damaged
11 September 1943	USS Rapidan	United States Navy	8,246	Convoy NG 385	32°39′N 79°43′W Damaged

=== Fifteenth patrol ===
Date	Name	Flag	Tonnage (GRT)	Convoy	Position
13 June 1944	Lark	United States	148		43°00′N 65°12′W Damaged

=== Sixteenth and final patrol ===
On 16 August 1944, U-107 departed from Lorient on a transport run to La Pallice. She was intercepted on 18 August in the Bay of Biscay, west of La Rochelle, in position 46°46′N 03°49′W, by Allied forces, and was sunk by depth charges from a Short Sunderland (serialEJ150) of No. 201 Squadron, Royal Air Force. All 58 hands were lost.

=== Wolfpacks ===
U-107 took part in 15 wolfpacks, namely:

- Störtebecker (5 – 7 November 1941)
- Seeräuber (14 – 23 December 1941)
- Blücher (23 – 28 August 1942)
- Iltis (6 – 23 September 1942)
- Hartherz (3 – 7 February 1943)
- Delphin (11 – 14 February 1943)
- Robbe (16 February – 13 March 1943)
- Amsel 2 (4 – 6 May 1943)
- Elbe (7 – 10 May 1943)
- Elbe 2 (10 – 14 May 1943)
- Weddigen (24 November – 7 December 1943)
- Coronel (7 – 8 December 1943)
- Coronel 2 (8 – 14 December 1943)
- Coronel 3 (14 – 17 December 1943)
- Borkum (18 – 30 December 1943)

== Summary of raiding history ==
Date	Name	Nationality	Tonnage (GRT)	Fate
3 February 1941	Empire Citizen	United Kingdom	4,683	Sunk
3 February 1941	HMS Crispin	Royal Navy	5,051	Sunk
6 February 1941	Maplecourt	Canada	3,388	Sunk
23 February 1941	HMS Manistee	Royal Navy	5,360	Sunk
8 April 1941	Eskdene	United Kingdom	3,829	Sunk
8 April 1941	Helena Margareta	United Kingdom	3,316	Sunk
9 April 1941	Harpathian	United Kingdom	4,671	Sunk
9 April 1941	Duffield	United Kingdom	8,516	Sunk
21 April 1941	Calchas	United Kingdom	10,305	Sunk
30 April 1941	Lassell	United Kingdom	7,417	Sunk
17 May 1941	Marisa	Netherlands	8,029	Sunk
18 May 1941	Piako	United Kingdom	8,286	Sunk
27 May 1941	Colonial	United Kingdom	5,108	Sunk
28 May 1941	Papalemos	Greece	3,748	Sunk
31 May 1941	Sire	United Kingdom	5,664	Sunk
1 June 1941	Alfred Jones	United Kingdom	5,013	Sunk
8 June 1941	Adda	United Kingdom	7,816	Sunk
13 June 1941	Pandias	Greece	4,981	Sunk
24 September 1941	John Holt	United Kingdom	4,975	Sunk
24 September 1941	Dixcove	United Kingdom	3,790	Sunk
24 September 1941	Lafian	United Kingdom	4,876	Sunk
31 January 1942	San Arcadio	United Kingdom	7,419	Sunk
6 February 1942	Major Wheeler	United States	3,431	Sunk
21 February 1942	Egda	Norway	10,068	Damaged
29 May 1942	Western Head	United Kingdom	2,599	Sunk
1 June 1942	Bushranger	Panama	4,536	Sunk
7 June 1942	Castilla	Honduras	3,910	Sunk
8 June 1942	Suwied	United States	3,249	Sunk
10 June 1942	Merrimack	United States	2,606	Sunk
19 June 1942	Cheerio	United States	35	Sunk
26 June 1942	Jagersfontein	Netherlands	10,083	Sunk
3 September 1942	Hollinside	United Kingdom	4,172	Sunk
3 September 1942	Penrose	United Kingdom	4,393	Sunk
7 October 1942	Andalucia Star	United Kingdom	14,943	Sunk
22 February 1943	Roxborough Castle	United Kingdom	7,801	Sunk
13 March 1943	SS Clan Alpine	United Kingdom	5,442	Sunk
13 March 1943	Marcella	United Kingdom	4,592	Sunk
13 March 1943	Oporto	United Kingdom	2,352	Sunk
13 March 1943	Sembilangan	Netherlands	4,990	Sunk
1 May 1943	Port Victor	United Kingdom	12,411	Sunk
28 August 1943	Albert Gallatin	United States	7,176	Damaged
11 September 1943	USS Rapidan	United States Navy	8,246	Damaged
13 June 1944	Lark	United States	148	Damaged

== Bibliography ==
- Busch, Rainer; Röll, Hans-Joachim (1999). German U-boat commanders of World War II: a biographical dictionary. Translated by Brooks, Geoffrey. London, Annapolis, Md: Greenhill Books, Naval Institute Press. ISBN 1-55750-186-6.
- Busch, Rainer; Röll, Hans-Joachim (2003). Deutsche U-Boot-Verluste von September 1939 bis Mai 1945 [German U-boat losses from September 1939 to May 1945]. Der U-Boot-Krieg (in German). Vol. IV. Hamburg, Berlin, Bonn: Mittler. ISBN 3-8132-0514-2.
- Gröner, Erich; Jung, Dieter; Maass, Martin (1991). German Warships 1815–1945, U-boats and Mine Warfare Vessels. Vol. 2. Translated by Thomas, Keith; Magowan, Rachel. London: Conway Maritime Press. ISBN 0-85177-593-4.
- Kemp, Paul (1999). U-Boats Destroyed - German Submarine Losses in the World Wars. London: Arms & Armour. ISBN 1-85409-515-3.
