= SS Wahehe (1922) =

German-built passenger steamship

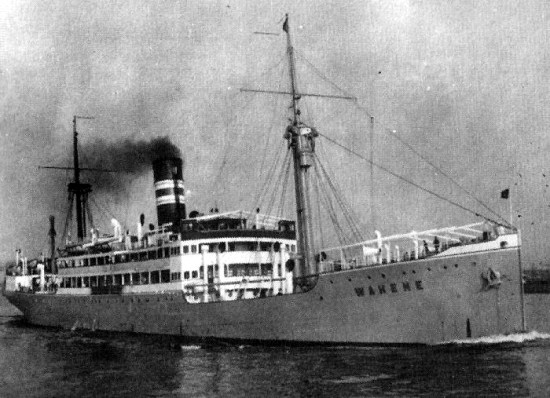
- Wahehe in 1927

History
- Name: Wadigo (1922); Wahehe (1922–40); Empire Citizen (1940–41)
- Namesake: Digo people (1922); Hehe people (1922–40)
- Owner: Woermann Linie AG (1922–40); Ministry of War Transport (1940–41)
- Operator: Woermann Linie AG (1922–40); P Henderson & Co (1940–41)
- Port of registry: (Weimar Republic) Hamburg (1922–33); (Nazi Germany) Hamburg (1933–40); (United Kingdom) London (1940–41)
- Builder: Reiherstieg Sw & Mf, Hamburg
- Launched: 1922
- Completed: August 1922
- Out of service: 3 February 1941
- Identification: code letters RCQH (1922–34); call sign DHZD (1934–40); call sign GLCB (1940–41); United Kingdom Official Number 167505 (1940–41)
- Fate: Torpedoed and sunk, 3 February 1941

General characteristics
- Tonnage: 4,690 GRT (1922–34); 4,709 GRT (1934–40); 4,683 GRT (1940–41); 2,686 NRT (1922–34); 2,771 NRT (1934–40); 2,736 NRT (1940–41)
- Length: 361.2 ft (110.1 m)
- Beam: 50.3 ft (15.3 m)
- Depth: 23.7 ft (7.2 m)
- Installed power: 336 NHP
- Propulsion: 1 × quadruple expansion engine; 1 × screw
- Speed: 10 knots (19 km/h)
- Capacity: At least 12 passengers (Wahehe, Empire Citizen)
- Crew: 69 +2 DEMS gunners ("Empire Citizen")

Position of the sinking of Empire Citizen.

Wahehe was a 4,690 GRT cargo ship which was built in 1922 as Wadigo by Reiherstieg Schiffswerfte und Maschinenfabrik, Hamburg for Woermann Linie AG. She was converted to a refrigerated cargo liner in about 1934.

At sea when war was declared in 1939, she sought refuge at Vigo, Spain. Wahehe sailed from Vigo in February 1940 in an attempt to reach Germany but was captured by the Royal Navy. She was declared a war prize and handed over to the Ministry of War Transport (MoWT), being renamed Empire Citizen. On 3 February 1941, she was torpedoed and sunk by U-107.

== Description ==
The ship was built by Reiherstieg Schiffswerfte und Maschinenfabrik, Hamburg. She was laid down as Wadigo and completed in August 1922 as Wahehe. She was named after first the Digo people and then the Hehe people. Both are tribes in Tanganyika Territory, which until 1918 was German East Africa and with which Woermann Linie still traded.

The ship's registered length was 361.2 feet (110.1 m), her beam was 50.3 feet (15.3 m) and her depth was 23.7 feet (7.2 m). Her tonnages were 4,690 GRT and 2,686 NRT.

The ship had a single screw, driven by a quadruple expansion engine rated at 336 NHP that gave her a speed of 10 knots (19 km/h).

== History ==
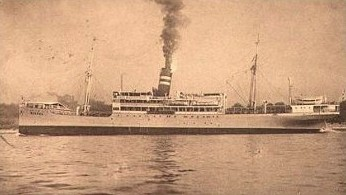
Wahehe in 1922

Wahehe was built for Woermann Linie AG, Hamburg. She was used on routes between Germany and Africa. She was registered in Hamburg and given the code letters RCQH. On 14 September 1922, Wahehe was the first German liner to call at Southampton, United Kingdom after the end of the First World War. On 27 November 1927, Wahehe collided with the pier on entering harbour at Boulogne, France and sprang a leak. On 3 November 1930, she collided with the German trawler Langeoog at the mouth of the Weser and sunk her with some loss of life.

In 1934 Wahehe was converted to a refrigerated cargo liner. Now 4,709 GRT, 2,771 NRT, her code letters were replaced with the Call sign DHZD. Wahehe departed Hamburg before war was declared on 3 September 1939. She and several other German merchant ships took refuge at Vigo in Spain, which was officially neutral.

On the night of 9/10 February 1940, a night with minimum moonlight, the German merchant ships Arucas, Morea, Orizaba, Rostock, Wahehe and Wangoni left Vigo to try to run the Allied blockade of Germany. French Navy and Royal Navy patrols seized Morea and Rostock as early as 11 February but Wahehe managed to evade capture for 11 days.

On 21 February Wahehe was southeast of Iceland at 62°50′N 14°20′W and making for the Norwegian Sea when the cruiser HMS Manchester and destroyers Kimberley and Kandahar intercepted her. The Royal Navy told Wahehe's crew that if they scuttled her, no attempt would be made to rescue them. A party from Kimberley boarded her and she was escorted into Kirkwall, Orkney Islands as a war prize. Wahehe was then towed to the Clyde, arriving on 8 March.

Wahehe was passed to the MoWT and renamed Empire Citizen. She was placed under the management of P Henderson & Co Ltd. Her port of registry was changed to London. She was given the UK official number 167505 and call sign GLCB. Her GRT was recorded as 4,683, with a NRT of 2,736. Empire Citizen was a member of a number of convoys during the Second World War.

OG 33

Convoy OG 33 formed at sea on 9 June 1940, bound for Gibraltar. Empire Citizen was carrying general cargo and was bound for Las Palmas, Spain.

OB 279

Convoy OB 279 departed Liverpool on 28 January 1941 and dispersed at sea on 2 February 1941. Empire Citizen was carrying general cargo bound for Freetown, Sierra Leone and Rangoon, Burma. At 01:45 German time on 3 February, Empire Citizen was torpedoed by U-107 under the command of Günter Hessler at 58°12′N 23°22′W. She settled slowly on an even keel and was abandoned by her crew and passengers. Another torpedo was fired at 02:33 following which she quickly sank by the stern. A total of 66 crew and 12 passengers were lost. The corvette HMS Clarkia rescued five crew and landed them at Londonderry Port (Derry). Those lost on Empire Citizen are commemorated at the Tower Hill Memorial, London.
