= SS Inkosi (1937) =

English cargo liner

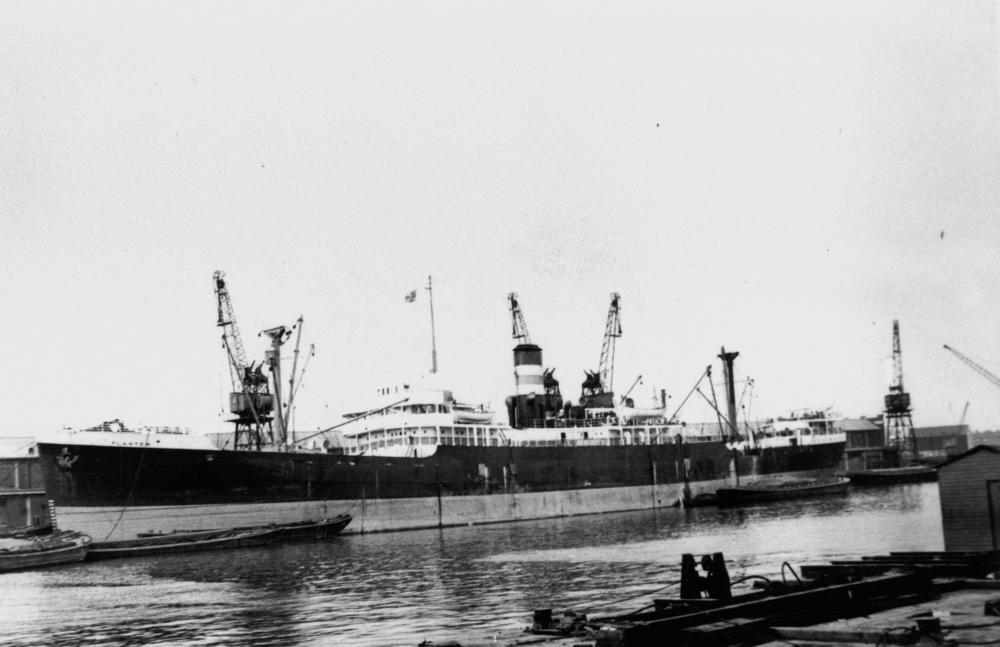
- Planter

History
- Name: Inkosi (1937-40); Empire Chivalry (1940-46); Planter (1946-58)
- Owner: Charente Steamship Co Ltd (1936-40); Ministry of War Transport (1940-45); Ministry of Transport (1945-46); T & J Harrison (1946-40)
- Operator: T & J Harrison (1937-40); Royal Navy (1940); T & J Harrison (1940-58)
- Port of registry: (United Kingdom) Liverpool (1937-40); (United Kingdom) London (1940-46); (United Kingdom) Liverpool (1946-58)
- Builder: Swan Hunter & Wigham Richardson Ltd, Wallsend
- Yard number: 1525
- Launched: 25 February 1937
- Completed: June 1937
- Maiden voyage: 18 June 1937
- Identification: Code Letters GZSS; United Kingdom Official Number 164328
- Fate: Scrapped

General characteristics
- Class & type: Refrigerated cargo liner (1937-40); Cargo ship (1940-58)
- Tonnage: 6,618 GRT (1937-40); 6,007 GRT (1940-58); 4,055 NRT (1937-40); 3,616 GRT (1940-59)
- Length: 414 ft 8 in (126.39 m)
- Beam: 56 ft 0 in (17.07 m)
- Depth: 28 ft 5 in (8.66 m)
- Installed power: Quadruple expansion steam engine
- Propulsion: Screw propeller
- Capacity: 82 passengers
- Notes: 11,030 cubic feet (312 m^{3}) refrigerated cargo space

Inkosi was a 6,618 GRT refrigerated cargo liner which was built by Swan, Hunter & Wigham Richardson Ltd, Newcastle upon Tyne for the Ministry of War Transport (MoWT). She was hired by the Royal Navy in 1940 for use as an ocean boarding vessel, but was sunk in an air raid before she could be used for this purpose. The ship was salvaged, converted to a cargo ship and passed to the Ministry of War Transport (MoWT), who renamed her Empire Chivalry. In 1946 she was sold and renamed Planter. She served until 1958, when she was scrapped.

== Description ==
The ship was built by Swan, Hunter & Wigham Richardson Ltd, Newcastle upon Tyne. She was launched in 1937, and completed in June 1937.

As built, the ship was 414 feet 8 inches (126.39 m) long, with a beam of 56 feet 0 inches (17.07 m) and a depth of 27 feet 0 inches (8.23 m). She had a GRT of 6,618 and a NRT of 4.055.

The ship was propelled by a quadruple expansion steam engine, which had cylinders of 28 inches (71 cm), 41 1/2 inches (105 cm), 59 inches (150 cm) and 84 inches (210 cm) diameter by 54 inches (140 cm) stroke. The engine was built by Wallsend Slipway & Engine Co, Wallsend.

Inkosi had 11,030 cubic feet (312 m^{3}) of refrigerated cargo space over two holds. There were two refrigerating units and two compressors. The ship could make 16½ tons of ice per day. She had cabins for 82 passengers.

== History ==
Inkosi was owned by the Charente Steamship Co Ltd, and operated under the management of T & J Harrison Ltd. The United Kingdom Official Number 164328 and the Code Letters GZSS were allocated. Her port of registry was Liverpool. She departed London on her maiden voyage to the West Indies and British Guiana on 18 June 1937. She operated between the United Kingdom and the West Indies. Inkosi arrived in Trinidad in October 1939, from England.

Inkosi was a member of a number of convoys during the Second World War.

HXF 11

Convoy HXF 11 departed Halifax, Nova Scotia on 2 December 1939 and arrived at Liverpool on 15 December. Inkosi was carrying a cargo of foodstuff and pitch. On 6 December, Inkosi lost the convoy in fog, but managed to rejoin on 7 December. A funeral was held on board Inkosi on 11 December.

HX 58

Convoy HX 58 departed Halifax on 15 July 1940 and arrived at Liverpool on 31 July. Inkosi had started her voyage at Bermuda and departed Halifax on 14 July. She was carrying general cargo bound for the Clyde. Inkosi was carrying the convoy's Rear Commodore.

On 11 August 1940, Inkosi was hired by the Royal Navy for use as an ocean boarding vessel. On 7 September 1940, Inkosi was sunk in an air raid while berthed at the Royal Albert Dock, London. She was refloated on 4 October 1940. Inkosi was taken over by the MoWT and rebuilt as a cargo ship, being renamed Empire Chivalry.

She remained under the management of T & J Harrison Ltd, although her port of registry was changed to London. The refrigerating equipment was removed during the conversion, which reduced her to 6,007 GRT, 3,616 NRT.

Empire Chivalry was a member of a number of convoys.

HX 193

Convoy HX 193 departed Halifax on 7 June 1942 and arrived at Liverpool on 19 June.

HX 249

Convoy HX 293 departed New York on 23 July 1943 and arrived at Liverpool on 6 August. Empire Chivalry was carrying a cargo of sugar and cotton. She was carrying the Convoy Commodore.

ON 225

Convoy ON 225 departed Liverpool on 22 February 1944, bound for New York. During the voyage, the merchant ship Joel R. Poinsett broke in two. Empire Chivalry stood by the wreck. Due to the break-up of the convoy in bad weather, Empire Chivalry and the group of stragglers she was in, escorted by HMCS Nanaimo actually arrived at New York on 8 March, ahead of the main convoy.

In 1946, Empire Chivalry was sold to T & J Harrison Ltd and was renamed Planter. Her port of registry was changed to Liverpool. She served until 1958 when she was scrapped at Ghent, Belgium.
