= SMS Meteor (1914) =

Coordinates: 55°56′N 6°43′E

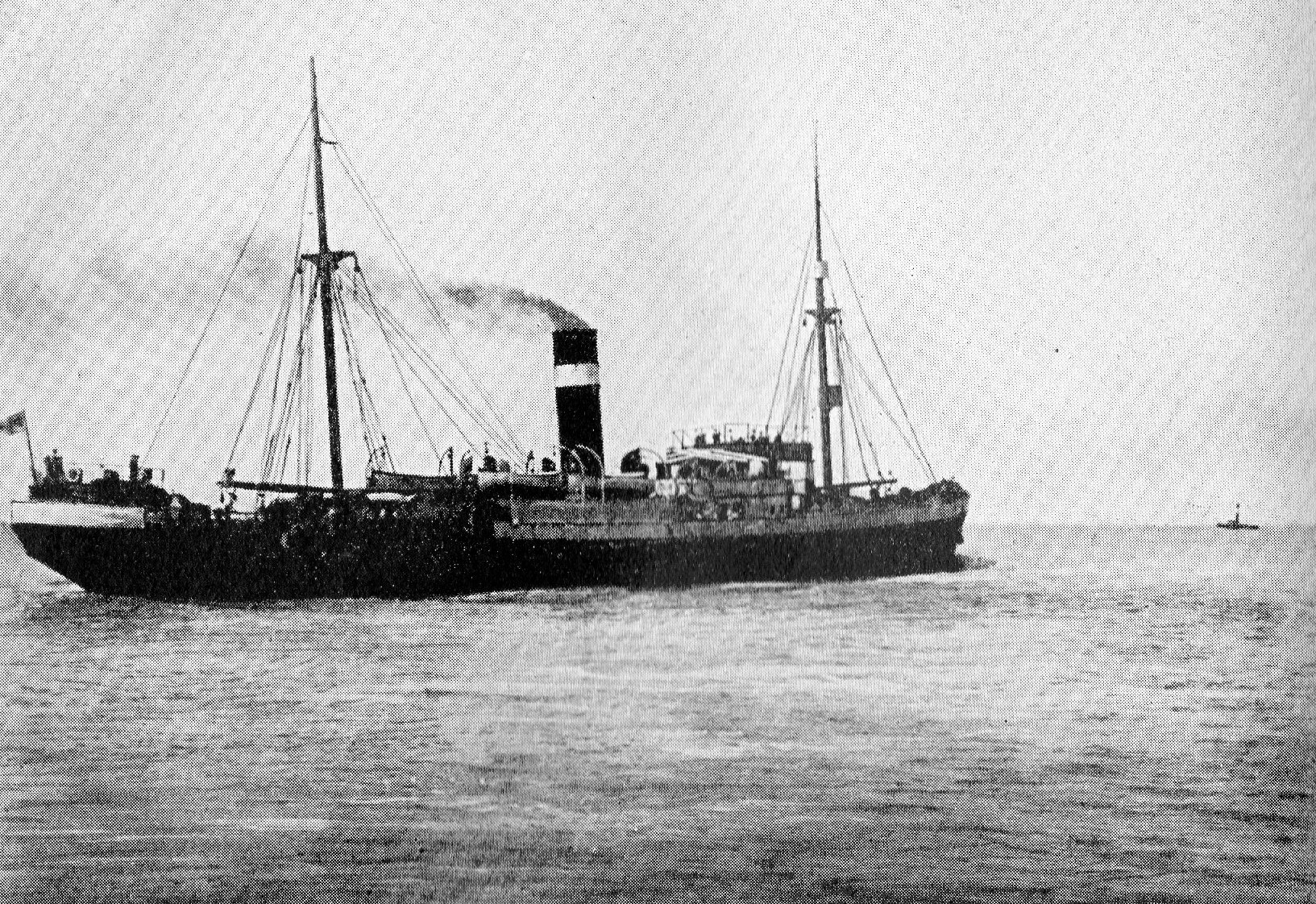
- SMS Meteor

History

German Empire
- Name: Meteor
- Builder: Ramage & Ferguson, Leith
- Launched: 1903
- Acquired: Aug 1914
- Commissioned: 6 May 1915
- Fate: Scuttled to avoid capture 9 August 1915

General characteristics
- Displacement: 3,640 tonnes (3,580 long tons) (1,912 GRT)
- Length: 89.1 m (292.3 ft)
- Beam: 11.3 m (37.1 ft)
- Draught: 5.1 m (16.7 ft)
- Propulsion: 1×3 cyl III Exp, 2 boilers, 2,400 hp (1,800 kW)
- Speed: 14 knots (26 km/h; 16 mph)
- Range: 9,000 nm at 9 kn
- Complement: 131
- Armament: 2 × 8.8cm SK L/45; 1 × 5.2 cm; 2 × 3.7 cm; 2 x 50 cm C/08 Torpedo Tubes; 374 mines

SMS Meteor was an auxiliary cruiser of the Imperial German Navy which operated against Allied shipping during World War I.

== Early career ==
Originally built as the British freighter Vienna in 1903 by Ramage & Ferguson, of Leith, for Curries shipping line. At the outbreak of war in August 1914 Vienna was at Hamburg and was seized as a prize there. To take advantage of her unmistakably British appearance, the Imperial German Navy decided to convert her into an auxiliary cruiser and minelayer. She was moved to the Kaiserliche Werft (KWW) in Wilhelmshaven, where she was equipped with two 88 mm guns and two machine guns. She had minelaying equipment installed and a capacity for 374 mines. She was renamed Meteor and commissioned in May 1915 under the command of KK Wolfram von Knorr.

== Service history ==
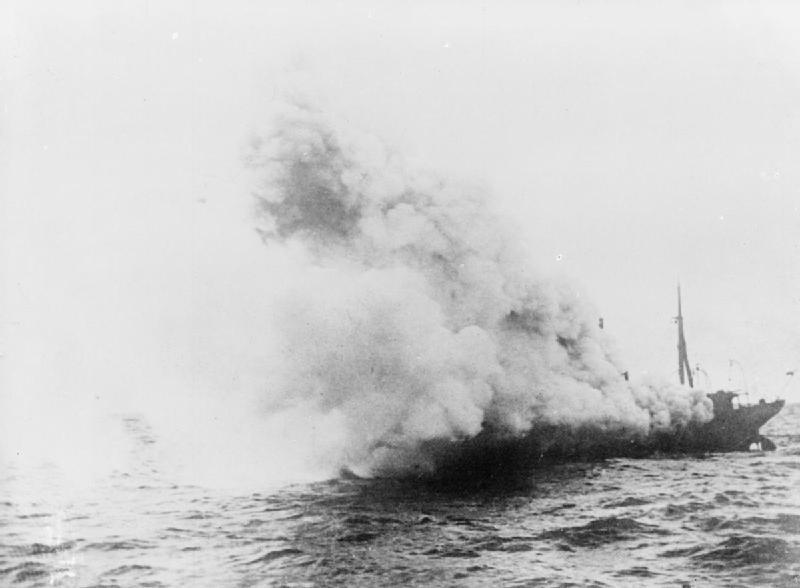
SMS Meteor on fire, shortly before she sank

On 29 May 1915 Meteor set out on her first mission, to lay mines in the White Sea and attack Allied merchant ships engaged in taking coal and other materiel to Russia. In this she had several successes, sinking three freighters and laying her mines, which accounted for another three ships. She returned unharmed in June 1915.

Her second mission, in August 1915, was to lay mines in the Moray Firth, but this was less successful. In the course of this operation, while attempting to run the British blockade, Meteor was challenged by the British armed boarding vessel HMS Ramsey, which stopped her for inspection. While stopping to be boarded, Meteor was able to maneuver into a firing position, and, suddenly opening fire, she quickly overwhelmed Ramsey, which sank. The opening salvos destroyed the bridge of the Ramsey, a torpedo struck Ramsey near the stern below the crew quarters. Most of the crew were still in their quarters and were killed during the explosion.

Retribution was swift, and several British cruisers in the area, which had received Ramsey's report, closed in on her. Notified by an Imperial German Navy airship, which was scouting in the area, on 9 August 1915 Meteor's captain decided to scuttle her to avoid capture. Meteor transferred the survivors of Ramsey and the crew of the Jason to a passing Norwegian vessel, while the Meteor's crew transferred to a passing Swedish merchant and returned to Germany to a hero's welcome. The Norwegian vessel rendezvoused with the British cruisers and turned over the Ramsey survivors, the British cruisers located the foundering Meteor and confirmed its sinking.

== Aftermath ==
While Meteor career was short lived it was viewed as highly successful, laying minefields in critical shipping lanes out of reach of submarines, with minimal investment of resources. This proved the value of Frachtdampfer-Hilfskreuzer (Freighter-auxiliary cruisers) that could pose as conventional merchant vessels and whose large cargo holds could carry supplies for long voyages. This model would be the basis for later successful auxiliary cruisers such as Wolf and Möwe.

== Raiding career ==
In two voyages Meteor sank five ships, her mines sunk another nineteen, and damaged 2 minesweepers, with a total tonnage in excess of 45,000 GRT.

Ships sunk by Meteor on her first raiding voyage
Date	Ship	Type	Nationality	Tonnage GRT	Fate
15.6.15	Verdandi	freighter	Swedish	950	sunk
16.6.15	Granit	freighter	Norwegian	662	sunk
16.6.15	Thorsten	freighter	Swedish	1.634	sunk

Sunk by mines from Meteor on her first raiding voyage
Date	Ship	Type	Nationality	Tonnage GRT	Location
11.6.15	Arndale	freighter	British	3.583	Archangel
17.06.15	Nicolai		Russian	154	Archangel
20.6.15	Twilight	freighter	British	3.100	Archangel
14.07.15	Urania	freighter	Russian/Finnish	1.934	Archangel
26.7.15	Madura	freighter	British	4.484	Archangel
06.07.15	African Monarch	freighter	British	4.003	Archangel
06.07.15	Lysaker	freighter	Norwegian	2.031	Archangel
24.6.15	Drumloist	freighter	British	3.118	Archangel
8.8.15	Benarthur	sailing ship	British	2.029	Archangel
31.08.15	Helga	freighter	Norwegian	949	Archangel
27.09.15	Vincent	schooner	American	1.904	Archangel
21.10.15	Cape Antibes	freighter	British	2.549	Archangel
18.11.15	Helen Martin	schooner	American	2.265	Archangel

Ships sunk by Meteor on her second raiding voyage
Date	Ship	Type	Nationality	Tonnage GRT	Fate
8.8.15	Jason	sailing ship	Danish	159	sunk
8.8.15	HMS Ramsey	ABV	British	1,621	sunk in action

Sunk by mines from Meteor on her second raiding voyage
Date	Ship	Type	Nationality	Tonnage GRT	Location
9.8.15	HMS Lynx	destroyer	British	1.072	Firth of Moray
12.8.15	Jacona	freighter	British	2.969	Firth of Moray
13.8.15	Princess Caroline	passenger ship	British	888	Firth of Moray
23.8.15	Commander Boyle	steam trawler	British	290	Firth of Moray
26.8.15	Jasper	naval trawler	British	221	Firth of Moray
15.2.16	Wilston	freighter	British	2.611	Firth of Moray

damaged by mines from Meteor on her second raiding voyage
Date	Ship	Type	Nationality	Tonnage GRT	Location
18.8.15	HMS Lilac	sloop minesweeper	British	1.200	Firth of Moray
4.9.15	HMS Dahlia	sloop minesweeper	British	1.200	Firth of Moray
