= SS Clan Alpine (1918) =

British steam cargo liner

Coordinates: 42°45′N 13°31′W

History

United Kingdom
- Name: Clan Alpine
- Owner: Clan Line Steamers Ltd, London
- Operator: Cayzer, Irvine & Co, Ltd
- Port of registry: Glasgow
- Builder: Greenock & Grangemouth Dockyard Co Ltd, Greenock
- Yard number: 379
- Launched: 28 January 1918
- Completed: 1918
- Identification: UK Official number 124232; Code letters JSTW (until 1933); Call sign GQMR (1934 onward)
- Fate: Sunk by torpedo 13 March 1943

General characteristics
- Type: Cargo liner
- Tonnage: until 1930: 5,485 GRT; 3,425 NRT; 1930 onward: 5,442 GRT; 3,390 NRT
- Length: 410.2 ft (125.03 m)
- Beam: 53.5 ft (16.31 m)
- Draught: 26 ft 0 in (7.92 m)
- Depth: 28.4 ft (8.66 m)
- Decks: 2
- Installed power: 538 NHP as built, 627 NHP after 1930
- Propulsion: Built with triple-expansion engine.; Exhaust steam turbine added 1930.
- Speed: 10.5 knots (19.4 km/h)
- Crew: 69
- Sensors & processing systems: Wireless direction finding
- Armament: (as DEMS): 1 × 4-inch or 4.7-inch gun; 2 × Bofors 40 mm guns; 4 × Machine guns

SS Clan Alpine was a UK steam cargo liner. She was launched in 1918 and sunk by a U-boat in 1943.

Clan Alpine spent her entire career with Clan Line. She was the third of five Clan Line ships to be called Clan Alpine.

== Details ==
The Greenock and Grangemouth Dockyard Co Ltd of Greenock built Clan Alpine, launching her on 28 January 1918 and completing her that April. Clan Alpine was 410.2 ft (125.03 m) long, had a beam of 53.5 ft (16.31 m) and draught of 26 ft 0 in (7.92 m). Until 1930 her tonnages were 5,485 GRT and 3,425 NRT.

Clan Alpine was built with a triple-expansion engine that developed 538 NHP. In 1930 a Bauer-Wach exhaust steam turbine was added, which increased her fuel efficiency. It also increased her total power to 627 NHP and gave her a service speed of 10.5 knots (19.4 km/h). Also in 1930 her tonnages were revised to 5,442 GRT and 3,390 NRT.

Clan Macneil's UK official number was 141879. Her code letters were JSTW until 1933–34, when they were superseded by the call sign GQMR.

== Career ==
Clan Line operated cargo liner services between Britain, India, South Africa and East Africa, and also Australia and the USA.

In the Second World War Clan Alpine was defensively armed with a 4-inch or 4.7-inch gun on her stern, plus two Bofors 40 mm guns and four machine guns for anti-aircraft cover.

On 19 November 1942, while sailing to Saint Helena, Clan Alpine rescued 154 survivors from two lifeboats from the torpedoed Ellerman Lines troop ship City of Cairo and took them to Saint Helena.

== Loss ==
On 6 March 1943 Clan Alpine left Liverpool bound for Walvis Bay, Durban, Aden and Port Sudan carrying 11,317 tons of general cargo, including army and naval stores. She sailed in Convoy OS 44, which included 46 merchant ships.

Early on 13 March the German submarine U-107 sighted OS 44 in the North Atlantic west of Cape Finisterre. At 0530 hours U-107 fired several torpedoes at the convoy and hit four ships: Clan Alpine, Marcella, Oporto, Sembilangan.

Clan Alpine was damaged and 28 of her lascar crew were killed. She did not sink, but it was not practical to repair her or tow her to safety so her surviving crew abandoned her. The escorting sloop HMS Scarborough rescued the survivors and scuttled Clan Alpine with depth charges. Scarborough transferred the survivors to the merchant steamship Pendeen, which took them to Gibraltar.

== Bibliography ==
- Harnack, Edwin P (1938) [1903]. All About Ships & Shipping (7th ed.). London: Faber and Faber.
- Talbot-Booth, EC (1936). Ships and the Sea (Third ed.). London: Sampson Low, Marston & Co Ltd.
