= SS Manistee (1920) =

History

United Kingdom
- Name: Manistee
- Owner: Elders & Fyffes Ltd
- Operator: 1921: Elders & Fyffes Ltd; 1940 (United Kingdom) Royal Navy
- Port of registry: (United Kingdom) Liverpool
- Route: Bristol – Jamaica – Central America
- Builder: Cammell Laird, Birkenhead
- Yard number: 884
- Launched: 28 October 1920
- Completed: January 1921
- Identification: UK official number 145889; code letters KLBH (until 1933); call sign GDCX (1934 onward); pennant F 104 (1940 onward)
- Fate: Sunk by torpedo, 24 February 1941

General characteristics
- Type: banana boat
- Tonnage: 5,360 GRT, 3,288 NRT
- Length: 400.2 ft (122.0 m)
- Beam: 51.1 ft (15.6 m)
- Depth: 30.3 ft (9.2 m)
- Installed power: 447 NHP
- Propulsion: triple expansion steam engine
- Speed: 10.5 knots (19.4 km/h)
- Capacity: 190,000 cu ft (5,380 m^{3}); refrigerated cargo
- Crew: 141 (in Royal Navy service)
- Sensors & processing systems: by 1930: submarine signalling, wireless direction finding; by 1934: echo sounding device
- Armament: December 1940 onward: 2 × 6-inch guns; 1 × 12-pounder gun; 1 × anti-aircraft gun
- Notes: third of 16 sister ships

SS Manistee was an Elders & Fyffes Ltd banana boat that was launched in 1920. She was one of a numerous class of similar banana boats built for Elders & Fyffes in the 1920s.

In 1940 the British Admiralty requisitioned Manistee and had her converted into an ocean boarding vessel. She was a convoy escort in the Battle of the Atlantic until a U-boat sank her in 1941. None of her 141 crew survived.

She was the second of four Elders & Fyffes ships called Manistee. The first was built in 1904 and sunk by a U-boat in 1917. The third was built in 1932 as Eros, bought in 1946 and renamed Manistee, and scrapped in 1960. The fourth was built in 1972, transferred out of the Elders & Fyffes fleet in 1983, renamed Fleet Wave in 1984 and Mimoza in 1990.

== Building ==
Cammell Laird launched Manistee in Birkenhead on 28 October 1920 and completed her in January 1921. She was the third of 16 similar banana boats launched for Elders & Fyffes between 1919 and 1929. Ten were built by Cammell Laird, two by Workman, Clark in Belfast and four by Alexander Stephen and Sons in Glasgow.

Manistee's registered length was 400.2 ft (122.0 m), her beam was 51.1 ft (15.6 m) and her depth was 30.3 ft (9.2 m). Her tonnages were 5,360 GRT and 3,288 NRT. Her holds had 190,000 cu ft (5,380 m^{3}) of refrigerated cargo space.

Manistee had a triple expansion engine that was rated at 447 NHP and gave her a speed of 10.5 knots (19.4 km/h).

Manistee's navigation equipment included submarine signalling and wireless direction finding. In 1934 an echo sounding device was added, and the call sign GDCX superseded her code letters KLBH.

== Civilian service ==
Elders & Fyffes' main route was from Central America and Jamaica to Bristol. It also served Avonmouth, Liverpool, Swansea, Barbados, Trinidad, Panama and Costa Rica. Elders & Fyffes ships carried mail, general cargo and first class passengers as well as bananas.

For the first year of the Second World War Manistee remained in merchant service. Between October 1939 and August 1940 she made trips from Britain to Jamaica, Santa Marta in Colombia, Freetown in Sierra Leone, Cameroon, and Sydney, Nova Scotia.

On 7 July 1940 Manistee was in the Southwest Approaches southwest of Ireland, returning unescorted from Cameroon, when U-99 fired one torpedo at her. It missed, so U-99 surfaced and opened fire with her 88 mm deck gun. Manistee returned fire with her DEMS armament. Neither vessel scored any hits, and U-99 broke off the attack.

== Naval service ==
The Admiralty requisitioned Manistee on 14 September 1940. She was armed with two QF 6-inch naval guns, one QF 12-pounder 12 cwt naval gun and one anti-aircraft gun. In December 1940 she was commissioned into the Royal Navy with pennant number F 104. Her commander was Lt Cdr Eric Haydn Smith, RNR.

HMS Manistee was one of the escorts of Convoy OB 288, which left Liverpool on 18 February 1941. OB 288 dispersed in the North Atlantic at 2100 hours on 23 February northwest of Ireland and south of Iceland due to U-boat activity in the area. At 2242 (Berlin Time) the German submarine U-107 fired two torpedoes at Manistee at position 58°13′N 21°33′W. One hit her in the engine room. At 2256 hrs the Italian submarine Michele Bianchi fired torpedoes at Manistee, and claimed that one hit her stern.

Manistee stayed afloat, so at 2258 hrs U-107 fired at her again, but missed as Manistee got under way again. At 2342 hrs U-107 fired a torpedo from one of her stern tubes, which also missed. Manistee made 7.5 knots (13.9 km/h) and zig-zagged as U-107 chased her through the night. At 0758 hrs U-107 fired two more torpedoes, one of which hit Manistee's stern and sank her.

The destroyer HMS Churchill, corvette HMS Heather and Free French destroyer Léopard were sent to search for survivors, but none of her 141 crew was found.

== Bibliography ==
- Harnack, Edwin P (1930) [1903]. All About Ships & Shipping (3rd ed.). London: Faber and Faber.
- Harnack, Edwin P (1938) [1903]. All About Ships & Shipping (7th ed.). London: Faber and Faber.
- Talbot-Booth, EC (1936). Ships and the Sea (Third ed.). London: Sampson Low, Marston & Co Ltd.
