= Ocean boarding vessel =

Ship type

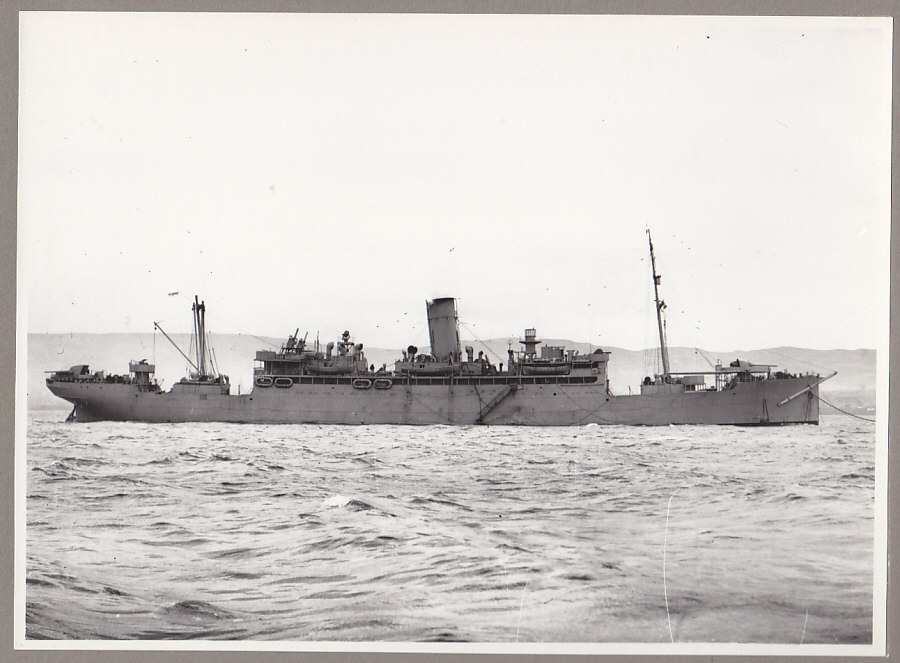
HMS Cavina in 1941

Ocean boarding vessels (OBVs) were merchant ships taken over by the Royal Navy during the Second World War for the purpose of enforcing wartime blockades by intercepting and boarding foreign vessels.

== Ships ==
| Ship | Date launched/ completed | Date requisitioned/ commissioned | History |
|---|---|---|---|
| HMS Ariguani | 1926 | | Converted to "Catapult Armed Ship". Used for convoy escort |
| HMS Camito | June 1915 | 26 September 1940 | Torpedoed and sunk 6 May 1941 |
| HMS Cavina | August 1940 | July 1942 | Converted from a banana boat. Returned to Elders & Fyffes |
| HMS Corinthian | | | Rescued survivors of Duchess of Atholl October 1942 Rescued survivors of RMS Empress of Canada 14 March 1943. |
| HMS Crispin | 1935 | August 1940 | Sunk 4 February 1941 after torpedo attack previous day |
| HMS Empire Audacity | 29 March 1939 | 11 November 1940 | Former German ship Hannover captured 7/8 March 1940 and put into British service. Commissioned as Ocean boarding vessel in November 1940 but sent for conversion to escort aircraft carrier in January 1941. |
| HMS Fratton | 28 September 1925 | August 1940 | The cross channel steamer was requisitioned by the Admiralty as a Barrage Balloon Vessel, converted to Ocean Boarding Vessel in 1943. She was sunk off Normandy by a Neger manned torpedo 18 August 1944. |
| HMS Hilary | 17 April 1931 | 21 January 1941 | Former Hilary; restored as a merchantman 15 April 1942; recommissioned as an infantry landing and headquarters ship 1943; returned to civilian service after the war in 1945; scrapped 1959. |
| Inanda | 1925 | 11 August 1940 | Bombed and sunk on 7 September 1940. Salvaged and converted to cargo ship Empire Explorer, never saw service as an ocean boarding vessel. Torpedoed and sunk in July 1942. |
| Inkosi | 1937 | 11 August 1940 | Bombed and sunk on 7 September 1940. Salvaged and converted to cargo ship Empire Chivalry, never saw service as an ocean boarding vessel. Sold postwar and renamed Planter. Scrapped 1958. |
| HMS Lady Somers | 1929 | | Requisitioned by Admiralty in 1940. Sunk by Italian submarine Morosini in N Atlantic, 15 July 1941. |
| HMS Largs | 1938 | 1941 | French ship Charles Plumier in 1938; seized by Royal Navy; returned to France 1945; sold to a Greek company and renamed Pleias 1964; scrapped 1968 |
| HMS Malvernian | 1937 | | Abandoned after being bombed, North Atlantic, 19 July 1941 |
| HMS Manistee | 1920 | 1940 | Sailed with Atlantic convoy OB 288. Sunk 24 February 1941, no survivors |
| HMS Marsdale | | | Participated in locating German supply ships after Bismarck had been sunk |
| HMS Maplin | 1932 | | Formerly Erin. Converted to Fighter catapult ship 1940. |
| HMS Patia | 1922 | | Converted to Fighter catapult ship in 1940. Sank after attacked by German aircraft 1941 |
| HMS Registan | 1930 | 13 September 1940 | Bombed off Cape Cornwall 27 May 1941; repaired and returned to merchant use November 1941; sunk 29 September 1942 |

== See also ==
- Armed boarding steamer – British vessels of similar purpose in First World War
- Hired armed vessels – British vessels that performed convoy escort duties, anti-privateer patrols, and ran errands during the French Revolutionary Wars and the Napoleonic Wars, and earlier.
