= HMS Kandahar =

Destroyer of the Royal Navy

Coordinates: 32°57′0″N 14°19′0″E

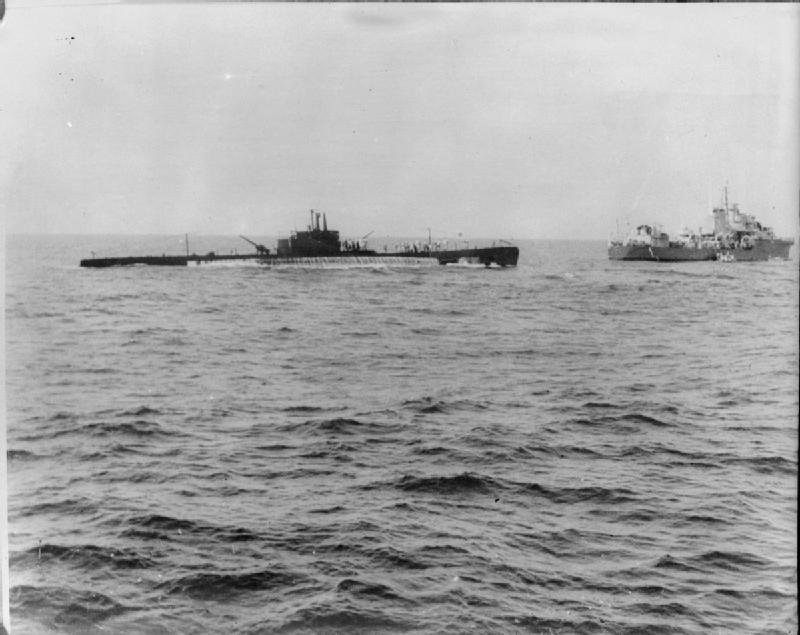
- HMS Kandahar with the captured Italian submarine Galileo Galilei, Gulf of Aden, June 1940

History

United Kingdom
- Name: HMS Kandahar
- Ordered: March 1935
- Builder: William Denny & Brothers
- Laid down: 18 January 1938
- Launched: 21 March 1939
- Commissioned: 10 October 1939
- Identification: Pennant number F28
- Honours and awards: Greece 1941 – Crete 1941 – Libya 1941 – Mediterranean 1941 – Malta Convoys 1941
- Fate: Mined, 19 December 1941; Scuttled by HMS Jaguar 20 December 1941

General characteristics (as built)
- Class & type: K-class destroyer
- Displacement: 1,690 long tons (1,720 t) (standard); 2,330 long tons (2,370 t) (deep load)
- Length: 356 ft 6 in (108.66 m) o/a
- Beam: 35 ft 9 in (10.90 m)
- Draught: 12 ft 6 in (3.81 m) (deep)
- Installed power: 44,000 shp (33,000 kW); 2 × Admiralty 3-drum boilers
- Propulsion: 2 × shafts; 2 × geared steam turbines
- Speed: 36 knots (67 km/h; 41 mph)
- Range: 5,500 nmi (10,200 km; 6,300 mi) at 15 knots (28 km/h; 17 mph)
- Complement: 183 (218 for flotilla leaders)
- Sensors & processing systems: ASDIC
- Armament: 3 × twin 4.7 in (120 mm) guns; 1 × quadruple 2 pdr (40 mm (1.6 in) AA guns; 2 × quadruple 0.5 in (12.7 mm) anti-aircraft machineguns; 2 × quintuple 21 in (533 mm) torpedo tubes; 1 × rack, 2 × throwers for depth charges

HMS Kandahar (F28) was a K-class destroyer built for the Royal Navy during the 1930s, named after the Afghan city of Kandahar.

== Description ==
The K-class destroyers were repeats of the preceding J class, except that they were not fitted for minesweeping gear. They displaced 1,690 long tons (1,720 t) at standard load and 2,330 long tons (2,370 t) at deep load. The ships had an overall length of 339 feet 6 inches (103.5 m), a beam of 35 feet (10.7 m) and a draught of 9 feet (2.7 m). They were powered by Parsons geared steam turbines, each driving one propeller shaft, using steam provided by two Admiralty three-drum boilers. The turbines developed a total of 40,000 shaft horsepower (30,000 kW) and gave a maximum speed of 36 knots (67 km/h; 41 mph). The ships carried a maximum of 484 long tons (492 t) of fuel oil that gave them a range of 5,500 nautical miles (10,200 km; 6,300 mi) at 15 knots (28 km/h; 17 mph). The ship's complement was 183 officers and men.

The ships were armed with six 4.7-inch (120 mm) Mark XII guns in twin mounts, two superfiring in front of the bridge and one aft of the superstructure. For anti-aircraft (AA) defence, they had one quadruple mount for 2-pounder "pom-pom" guns and two quadruple mounts for the 0.5 inch Vickers Mark III anti-aircraft machinegun. The K-class ships were fitted with two above-water quintuple mounts for 21-inch (533 mm) torpedoes. The ship was fitted with two depth charge throwers and one rack for 20 depth charges.

== Construction and career ==
Kandahar was launched on 21 March 1939.

On 21 February 1940, in company with sister ship Kimberley and the cruiser Manchester, she captured the German blockade runner SS Wahehe off Iceland.

On 19 December 1941, she was part of British Force K, tasked to intercept an Italian convoy bound for Tripoli when she was irreparably damaged by a newly laid Italian mine whilst attempting to rescue the stricken cruiser Neptune. She was scuttled the next day by the destroyer Jaguar. 73 men went down with the ship.
